= Amnesty International UK Media Awards 2000 =

The 9th Amnesty International UK Media Awards were held at BAFTA(British Academy of Film and Television Arts) on 22 June 2000. The host was Michael Mansfield QC.

There was an introduction of a new award in this edition, the "Global Award for Human Rights Journalism" for an outstanding article in the written media anywhere in the world.

In total there were 8 awards: Global Award for Human Rights Journalism, National Print, Periodicals, Photojournalism, Radio, Special Award for Human Rights Journalism Under Threat, Television Documentary and Television News. Kate Allen, Director of Amnesty International UK said: "These awards recognise the important role of the media in exposing violations, as well as telling the inspiring stories of people struggling against the odds to realise human rights."

The judges in all categories were Nick Clarke, Daljit Dhaliwal, Mark Lattimer, (Note: At the time of the 2000 Awards, Mark Lattimer was Communications Director at Amnesty International UK) Francine Stock, Greg Whitmore, (Note: At the time of the 2000 Awards, Greg Whitmore was Picture Editor at The Observer) and Peter Wilby.

== Notable Awards ==
The "Special Award for Human Rights Journalism Under Threat" was presented to Ignacio Gómez for his high-risk reporting on organized crime, corruption, and paramilitary groups.

The inaugural "Global Award for Human Rights Journalism" was presented to Palagummi Sainath for his work in The Hindu newspaper "A Dalit goes to court". Sainath showed in great detail the unconstitutional and systemic human rights abuse against over 170 Million Dalits, the manifestation of rape culture in India, and how Dalit women were denied human rights and access to justice. He showed how access to the legal systems was blocked with victims made to pay "Two hundred and twenty rupees entry fee", to enter the police station to lodge a criminal report - First Information Report (FIR). Sainath's work showed how the status, poverty, and education combinations empowered exploitation and institutional failure. A most telling comment was "All the judges of the Supreme Court do not have the power of a single police constable".

== Shortlist and Awards 2000 ==
2000
Category	Title	Organisation	Journalists
GLOBAL AWARD FOR HUMAN RIGHTS JOURNALISM
GLOBAL AWARD FOR HUMAN RIGHTS JOURNALISM	"A Dalit goes to Court"	The Hindu	Palagummi Sainath
GLOBAL AWARD FOR HUMAN RIGHTS JOURNALISM	The article "A Dalit goes to Court" published in The Hindu newspaper lays bare the systematic discrimination against the 170 million dalits (formerly known as 'untouchables') in India.		
National Print
National Print	After the slaughter, a nice retirement in south London	The Times	Ann Treneman
National Print	Series of articles on NATO bombings in Yugoslavia	The Independent	Robert Fisk
National Print	The boy killers of Sierra Leone	Daily Mirror	Anton Antonowicz
Periodicals
Periodicals	Child Sacrifice	Sunday Times Magazine	Christine Toomey
Periodicals	Convoy of the damned	Independent on Sunday Review	Robert Fisk
Periodicals	The rape of Kosovo	The Times Magazine	Janine di Giovanni
Photojournalism
Photojournalism	Child victims of war	The Mirror	Mike Moore
Photojournalism	Faces of war in Life	The Observer	John Reardon
Photojournalism	Kosovo: liberation and retribution	The Weekend Review, The Independent	Tom Pilston
Radio
Radio	Broadcasting House - Zambia	BBC Radio 4	Ishbel Matheson
Radio	Crossing Continents: A Kosovo homecoming	BBC Radio 4Iliriana Kacaniku	Iliriana Kacaniku
Radio	Strangers on the shore	BBC Radio 4	John Waite
SPECIAL AWARD FOR HUMAN RIGHTS JOURNALISM UNDER THREAT	Ignacio Gómez Special investigations editor of the Colombian newspaper El Espectador and Director of the Colombian Press Freedom Foundation. Gómez had to flee after learning that his name was on a paramilitary death list.		
Television; Documentary
Television; Documentary	'Careless Talk'	Panorama	John Ware
Television; Documentary	'Licence to kill'	Correspondent - BBC	Olenka Frenkiel
Television; Documentary	'Out of Africa'	Channel 4 Television	reported by Sorious Samura, produced by Insight News
Television; News
Television; News	Aceh	Channel 4 News	Ian Williams
Television; News	Nepal: rape, abortion, prison	Correspondent - BBC	Sue Lloyd-Roberts
Television; News	Rwanda genocide	BBC Newsnight	Fergal Keane
