= Gimnasio Moderno =

Coordinates: 4°39′34″N 74°03′21″W

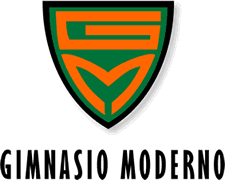
- Bogotá; Colombia

Information
- School type: Private school
- Founded: March 18, 1914 (111 years ago)
- Founder: Agustín Nieto Caballero
- Status: Open
- Head of school: Juan Sebastián Hoyos Montes
- Gender: Mixed gender
- Language: Spanish, English and French
- Athletics: football, basketball, volleyball and swimming
- Website: www.gimnasiomoderno.edu.co

The Gimnasio Moderno is a private mixed gender (Note: All-male until 2024. Female Pre-K students were allowed to enroll beginning in 2024.) elite-traditional and liberal, primary and secondary school located in Bogotá, Colombia. It was founded in 1914 by Colombians following the leading initiative of Agustín Nieto Caballero.

The school celebrated its centennial anniversary in 2014.

== Ideals ==
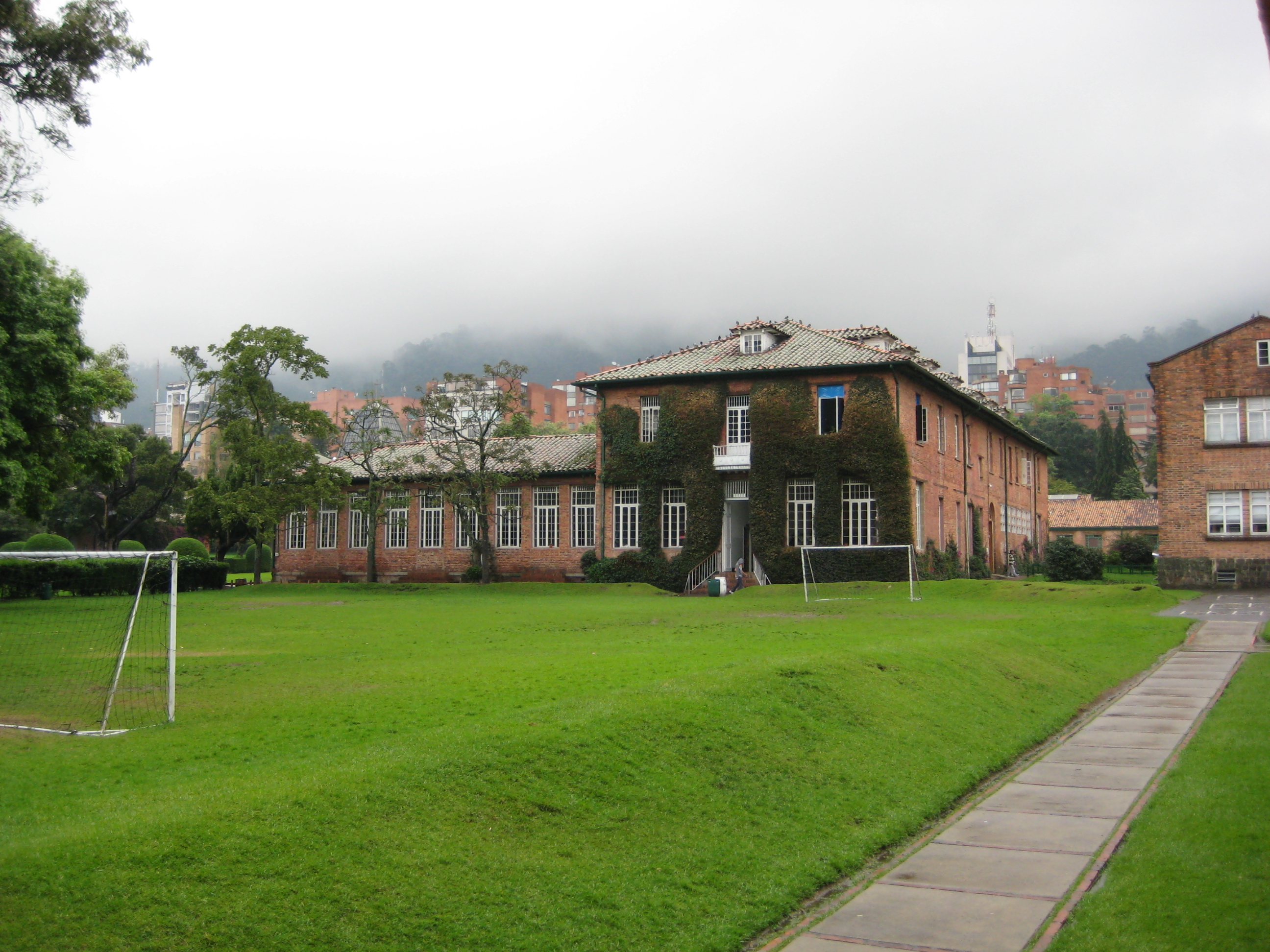
Gimnasio Moderno

The school's principle of conduct is based on the so-called discipline of trust (disciplina de confianza), following the lines of Maria Montessori's active discipline. This fundamental principle seeks to instill self-confidence and inner discipline in students, as well as to further their understanding of a deeper sense of responsibility, honesty, loyalty, and friendship through the active development of freedom. The Gimnasio Moderno was awarded a national monument status due to its longevity and historical stature.

Furthermore, the school centers its approach to teaching around the motto "Educar Antes que Instruir," which translates as "To educate rather than to instruct." This means that teaching moral values and allowing the development of students as honest, self-confident, and driven individuals, takes precedence over technical instruction. This approach is fruitful, and the school remains in the top tier of schools in the country by academic standards.

The educational program is divided into four sections. The first section includes Montessori 1, 2, and 3 and the first Decroly. The second section includes the second, third, fourth, and fifth Decroly grades. The third section includes the sixth through ninth grades, and the fourth section includes the tenth and eleventh grades.

== Traditions ==
The school's traditions include:

A marching band (winners of the Batuta de Plata competition, won for the first time in 1999 with Sebastian Devis as tambor mayor, then in 2006 with Nicolás Medina as tambor mayor, in 2012 with Germán Garcia as tambor mayor, in 2016 with Pablo Güete as tambor mayor and in 2017 with Juan Felipe Noguera as tambor mayor.

A Football championship between Gimnasio Moderno and Gimnasio Campestre, called the Copa Tradicion. The school also hosts the Eaglet Cup (Copa Aguilucho), a Football (Soccer) league made up of teams from different grades within the school.

In 1941, alumni from the school founded the football club Independiente Santa Fe, whose origin is traced back to a team formed by them to play a match against the school team as part of the celebrations of the school's 25th anniversary.

Single and multiple-day excursion trips throughout the country. Following the ideals of Robert Baden-Powell.

Sports Teams: The school has traditionally encouraged and supported its sports teams, such as the, football, basketball, volleyball and swimming teams.

Student awards: The school gives annual recognition to those students who excel in different areas. These areas are called, personal effort, kindness to others, 'excursionist spirit' and a group recognition of friendship awarded to an entire class.

Brotherhood with the "Gimnasio Femenino": This private all-female school was conceived by Agustin Nieto Caballero and some other influential personalities of the Gimnasio Moderno in 1927. Since this, the two schools have shared a special link, they celebrate many dates together, do a wide range of activities through the year, and basically, share academic and fun moments with the opposite genre once in a while.

Semana Cultural (Cultural Week) which is an ensemble of cultural activities, including the Mañana del Talento Gimnasiano (Morning of Talent) during which students present theater plays, comedy acts, and musical numbers among others. Students often make fools of themselves, but every once in a while true talents are unveiled. The school also hosts the citywide famous Concurso de Barras Maria Helena Amador(Cheerleader contest) for which cheerleader groups from all-girls schools across the city prepare through the year.

== Headmasters ==
- Alberto Corradine Varela (1914)
- Pablo Vila Dinares (1915–1917)
- Tomás Rueda Vargas (1918–1920, 1922–1924, 1927–1933 and 1937–1943)
- Erich Heincke Hoyer (1921)
- Aurelio Tobón Mejía (1925–1927)
- Julio Carrizosa Valenzuela (1934–1936)
- Daniel Samper Ortega (1943–1944)
- Carlos Lleras Restrepo (1944)
- Agustín Nieto Caballero (1945–1975)
- Ernest Bein (El Prof.) (1975–1980)
- Mario Galofre Cano (1981–1984 and 1986–1994)
- Germán Pardo Sánchez (1985)
- Leopoldo Gonzalez Chaparro (1995–1997)
- Juan Carlos Bayona Vargas (1998–2012)
- Guillermo González Lecaros (e) (2012)
- Víctor Alberto Gómez Cusnir (2012–present)

== Marching band ==
The marching band of the Gimnasio Moderno is one of the oldest school marching bands in Bogotá, it is more than 50 years old.

- The drum major, or leader, of the band is selected by democratic process in which band members cast a secret ballot. Such process has taken place every year since 1952 and all members of the band vote.

This is one of the most traditional school bands in Colombia.

- The band won the Batuta de Plata competition for the first time in 1999, a second in 2006, a third in 2012, a fourth in 2016 and fifth and second consecutive win in 2017.
- The marching band received an award on 7 July 2018 by the Congress of the Republic of Colombia.

== Notable alumni ==
- Alfonso Lopez Michelsen former president of Colombia
- Ernesto Samper Pizano former president of Colombia
- Julio Mario Santo Domingo businessman
- Rodolfo Llinás neuroscientist
- Mario Laserna Pinzón founder of University of Los Andes (Colombia)
- Fidel Cano Correa journalist, CEO of El Espectador newspaper
- Guillermo Cano Isaza journalist
- Rafael Pardo former congressman, minister of Defense and Labour and mayor of Bogotá
- Eduardo Caballero Calderón journalist and writer
- Antonio Caballero, journalist and writer
- Daniel Samper Pizano lawyer, journalist, writer
- Diego Trujillo actor
- Jorge Enrique Abello actor
