= Uprimny =

Uprimny is a surname. Notable people with the surname include:

- Rodrigo Uprimny (born 1959), Colombian legal scholar
- Sebastián Uprimny (born 1975), Colombian cross-country skier
