= Eudoro Galarza Ossa =

Colombian journalist

Eudoro Galarza Ossa (Caramanta, 1895 – Manizales, October 12, 1938) was a Colombian journalist. He was editor-in-chief of the newspaper La Voz de Caldas, which had been circulating in Manizales for 13 years. He was assassinated by Lieutenant Jesús María Cortés Poveda and is often considered 'the first Colombian journalist assassinated'. Represented by Jorge Eliécer Gaitán as his lawyer, Cortés Poveda was absolved after ten years.

The Foundation for Press Freedom considers Galarza Ossa's "the first murder of a journalist for reasons of his work of which there is a record in Colombia". By 2018, the historical number of journalists killed for reasons related to their work in Colombia was estimated in 155.
