= Angarita =

Angarita is a Spanish surname. Notable people with the surname include:

- Gustavo Angarita (1942–2025), Colombian actor
- Marvin Angarita (born 1989), Colombian cyclist
- Mayerlis Angarita (born 1980s), Colombian human rights activist

== See also ==
- Isaías Medina Angarita (1897–1953), Venezuelan military and politician, President of Venezuela (1941–1945)
