= Fidel Cano Correa =

Colombian journalist

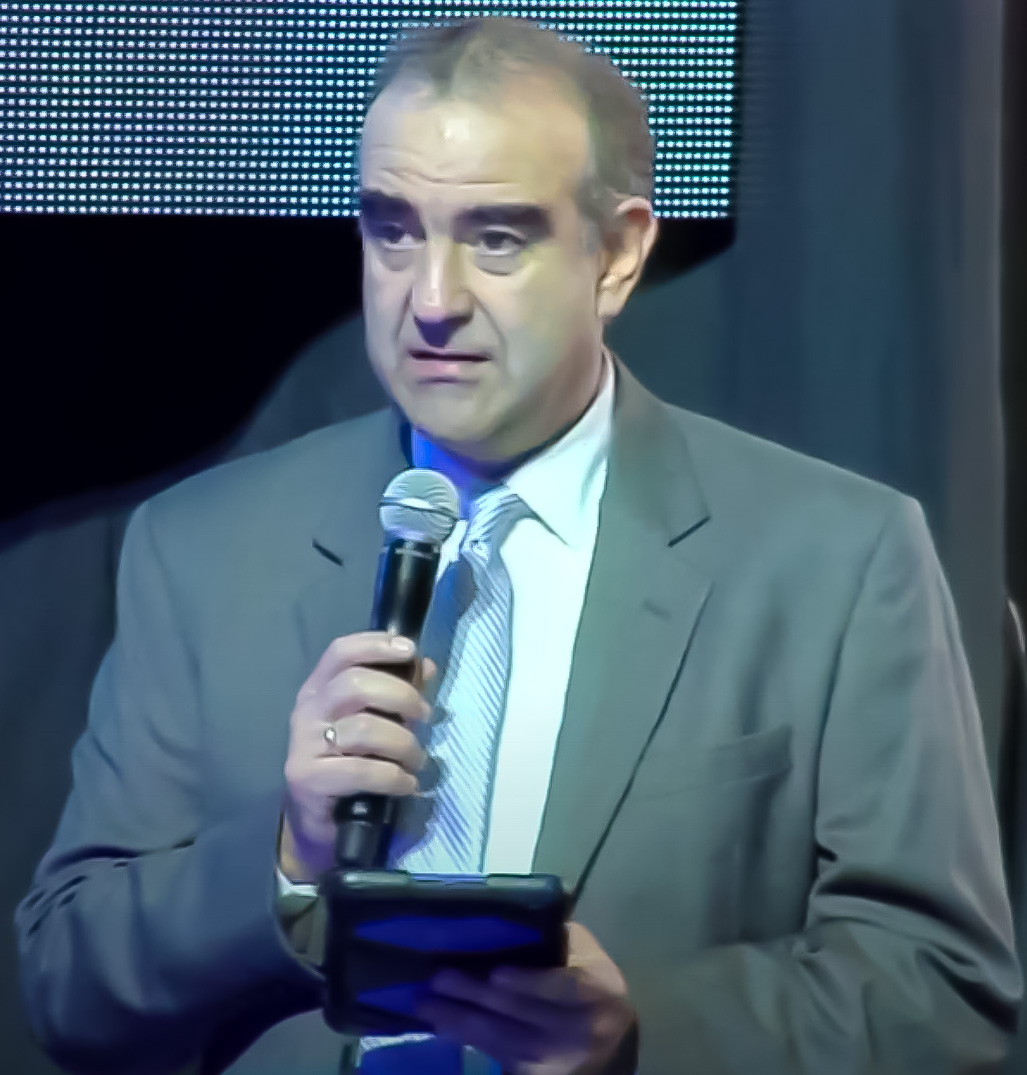

Fidel Cano Correa is a Colombian journalist, born 23 November 1965 in Bogotá. Since May 2004 he is the publisher of El Espectador, Colombia's oldest newspaper.

Cano is a great-grandson of Fidel Cano Gutiérrez, (founder of El Espectador), and a nephew of Guillermo Cano Isaza. He received his primary and secondary education at Gimnasio Moderno, majored in Philosophy from the University of Los Andes, earned a degree in International Relations from New York University and a Master of Science degree in journalism from Northwestern University.

Between 1987 and 1995, Cano Correa worked at El Espectador as sports writer, lifestyle and economy editor, and correspondent in the United States. Later he would become press attaché at the Colombian embassy in Washington, D. C. He was political editor at El Tiempo between 1998 and 2000.

In 2000, Cano Correa returned to his family's newspaper as general editor. In 2001, El Espectador was forced to downgrade to a weekly, circulating on weekends only. Nevertheless, Cano Correa, who became publisher in 2004, led a journalistic and economic recovery which allowed El Espectador to resume daily publishing in May 2008.

In 2006, Cano Correa was named Journalist of the Year at the Premio Nacional de Periodismo Simón Bolívar.

Cano Correa is also active on Twitter, where he tweets about what will be published the next day in the print edition of El Espectador. One of his posts, where he referred to the redesign which El Tiempo would unveil in early October 2010, was "poorly welcomed" by its directors, according to Semana.
