= Evaristo Porras Ardila =

Colombian drug trafficker (died 2010)

Evaristo Porras Ardila ("Papá Doc") (“Godoc”) was one of the top Colombian cocaine traffickers and regarded as one of the leaders of the Medellín Cartel. He had strong influence in Leticia, the capital of the Amazonas region of Colombia. Porras is suspected to have been the head of the Leticia-Tabatinga cartel organized crime syndicate.

== Political scandals ==
He became famous in 1984 when it was known that he had made a large money contribution to the senate campaign of the then minister of Justice Rodrigo Lara Bonilla. Minister Lara, who always said to be a victim of a setup, was assassinated by hitmen of Medellin Cartel on April 30, 1984 in Bogotá. This was the first assassination committed by the Colombian Mafia.

Several years later, Porras again was involved in another political scandal, when it was known that he was present in a political meeting in which the politicians Rodrigo Turbay Cote and Jorge Eduardo Gechem also participated. This caused both politicians to be expelled out of the Liberal Colombian Party .

== Arrests ==
He was detained for the first time in 1978 but was able to escape by feigning illness. On the day of his breakout, he was helped by his lawyer and partner Vladimiro Montesinos and escaped out of the prison Daniel Carrión at the Peruvian port city of El Callao by saying he had appendicitis.

After his breakout in Perú, he sought refuge and would go out to direct his business in either Medellín or San Andrés, cities where he had properties. In Medellín, he again would be captured for the second time in May 1984 in one of the operations deployed by the Colombian Police after the death of Lara Bonilla. He was freed because he could only be indicted for illegal possession of firearms.

In January 1987 at the Hotel Bahía Marina located in San Andrés, he was captured for the third time in one of the raids deployed by the Colombian police after the death of Guillermo Cano, but a military judge released him shortly afterwards. He came back to Leticia and two years later he would be again captured in Ecuador and deported to Colombia. Upon arriving at Bogotá, he had vestiges of having undergone a plastic surgery and had contact lens to change the color of his eyes. He was again released shortly afterwards.

On December 15, 1995, he was captured for the fifth and last time, displaying early symptoms of Parkinson's disease, lame, and without bodyguards. This capture would mean the definitive demise of one of the most infamous Colombian drug lord's empire; he was not only known for his eccentric properties, notably a luxury brothel in the middle of the jungle, but also for his incursions into politics.

== Death ==
Porras died penniless of a heart attack on March 3, 2010. At the time, he was involved in a legal battle against the Colombian state, trying to recover some properties which had been expropriated in Bogotá and Leticia.

== Popular culture ==
- In TV series Pablo Escobar, The Drug Lord is portrayed by the actor and comedian Carlos Hurtado as the character of Crisanto Porras.

== See also ==
- Vladimiro Montesinos
- Pablo Escobar
