= Eduardo Zalamea Borda =

Colombian journalist

- Eduardo Zalamea Borda
- Born: Eduardo Zalamea Borda; 1907; Bogotá, Colombia
- Died: 1963 (age 56-58); Bogotá, Colombia
- Occupations: Journalist, Writer

Eduardo Zalamea Borda (1907–1963) was a Colombian journalist and writer. He was born in Bogota, Colombia. After a suicide attempt in Barranquilla, he went to live in La Guajira for several years. One of the writers he promoted, Gabriel García Márquez, later recalled that Borda "anchored himself at Café Roma (a restaurant in Barranquilla), and shot himself in the chest with a revolver, without serious consequences". He came back to Bogota at the age of 21. He joined the newspaper La Tarde as a cub reporter. He went on to become editor at El Liberal and El Espectador newspapers. At the latter, he became known for promoting young writers. Among them was the future Nobel Prize winner García Márquez, whose first story was published in El Espectador in 1947.

Zalamea Borda was also known as a writer in his own right. He is considered a pioneer of modernist narrative techniques in Colombian prose. He published a well-received novel 4 años a bordo de mí mismo in 1934, although it was initially thought to be pornographic. His second novel, La cuarta bateria was not published in his lifetime, released in 2001, 38 years after his death.

Zalamea Borda is related to the Colombian writers Luis Zalamea Borda and Jorge Zalamea Borda.
