= Gabriel Sierra =

Colombian artist (born 1975)

- Born: 1975 (age 49–50); San Juan Nepomuceno, Bolívar, Columbia
- Education: Jorge Tadeo Lozano University
- Occupation(s): Visual artist, sculptor
- Movement: Conceptual art

Gabriel Sierra (born 1975) is a Colombian contemporary artist. His work combines aspects of fine art, design, and architecture. Sierra lives in the capital city of Bogotá.

== Biography ==
Gabriel Sierra was born in 1975 in San Juan Nepomuceno, Bolívar, Columbia. Sierra received a degree in industrial design in 2000 from the Jorge Tadeo Lozano University (Spanish: Universidad de Bogotá Jorge Tadeo Lozano).

Much of Sierra's work explores the architecture in everyday items, and he employs a variety of techniques including installation art, sculpture, and text-based work. Sierra's Hang It All (2006) is a coatrack made with fruit, that alludes to Charles and Ray Eames’s coatrack design from 1953. His work Untitled (111.111.111 x 111.111.111 = 12345678987654321), was an installation made for the Hall of Architecture at the Carnegie Museum of Art for the Carnegie International (2013); the hall is full of classical sculpture and casts of architectural columns, he painted the walls purple and integrated purple furniture to the room to emphasized historical and contemporary formalities continuing alongside each other.

Sierra has had multiple solo exhibitions including Numbers in a Room (2015–2016), SculptureCenter in Queens, New York City, New York; the Renaissance Society (2015) at the University of Chicago; So Far (2013) at Peep-Hole in Milan, Italy; and the Centre d’Art Contemporain de Brétigny (2006), Brétigny-sur-Orge, France. He has participated in international group exhibitions including the 12th Istanbul Biennial (2011); The Ungovernables (2012) the New Museum Triennial, New Museum, New York; and the 56th Carnegie International (2013), Carnegie Museum of Art, Pittsburgh, Pennsylvania.

His work is part of the museum collection at the Museum of Modern Art (MoMA) in New York City.
