= Cecilia Orozco Tascón =

Colombian journalist

Cecilia Orozco Tascón (Note: In this Hispanic American name, the first or paternal surname is Orozco and the second or maternal family name is Tascón.) is a Colombian journalist. She writes opinion pieces for El Espectador and El País, and was for, 13 years, the director of the Noticias Uno newscast.

== Career ==
Orozco majored in social communication at Pontifical Xavierian University, and holds a master's degree in political science. She has been a reporter for several written and audiovisual media in Colombia, director of newscasts such as Noticiero de las siete, CM&, and Hora Cero, and readers' ombudswoman at El Tiempo. Besides her column, a weekly interview by Orozco appears every Sunday at El Espectador.

In 2010, she received the Premio Nacional de Periodismo Simón Bolívar award for the best opinion column.

She was replaced at Noticias Uno by Nacho Gómez in March 2024.

== Books ==
- ¿Y ahora qué? Futuro de la guerra y la paz en Colombia, El Áncora Editores, 2002. ISBN 978-958-36-0094-4
