= Agustín Nieto Caballero =

Colombian pedagogue

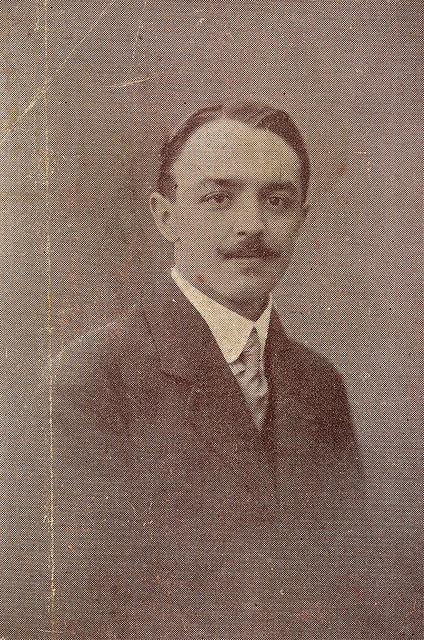
Agustín Nieto Caballero

Agustín Nieto Caballero (1889–1975) was a Colombian pedagogue who, in 1914, founded Gimnasio Moderno, a prestigious a private all-male traditional and liberal, primary and secondary school located in Bogotá, Colombia. It was founded in 1914 by various Colombians following the leading initiative of Agustín Nieto Caballero and co-founders José María Samper Brush, Daniel Samper Ortega, Tomás Rueda Vargas, and Ricardo Lleras Codazzi, freethinkers. The school is considered to be the oldest new school in South America at a time when education was dominated by the Church-ruled Catholic schools.
