= Ignacio Gómez =

Colombian journalist (born c. 1962)

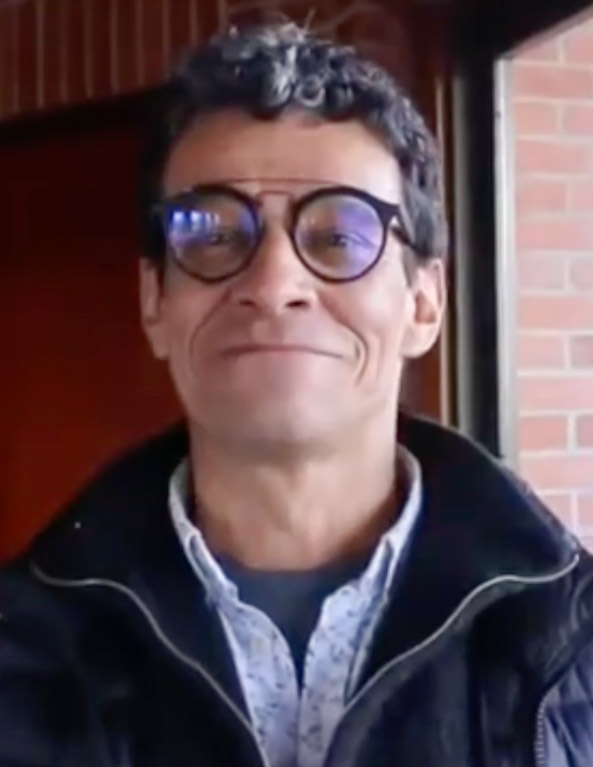
- Born: 1 January 1962 (age 64)
- Occupation: journalist
- Organization: El Espectador
- Known for: reporting on organized crime
- Awards: Nieman Fellow (2000); International Press Freedom Award (2002)

Ignacio Gómez Gómez (also known as Nacho; born 1 January 1962) is a Colombian journalist. He is known for his high-risk reporting on organized crime, corruption, and paramilitary groups. In 2000, he received the "Special Award for Human Rights Journalism Under Threat" Amnesty Media Award. In 2002, he was awarded the International Press Freedom Award of the Committee to Protect Journalists.

== Background ==
Gómez began working at El Espectador, a daily newspaper in Bogotá, at the age of 24. The paper's editor-in-chief at the time was Guillermo Cano, who was a hero of Gómez. On 17 December 1986, only a few weeks after Gómez's hiring, Cano was assassinated outside the El Espectador's office by a man with a submachine gun, apparently in retaliation for his reporting on Pablo Escobar and other drug lords. In the 1980s and 1990s, Colombia had the highest rate of murders of reporters in the world, and over the next fourteen years, ten more El Espectador reporters would be murdered. Gómez later described the mood at El Espectador as "like having your gravestone tied around your neck".

== Reporting ==
In the late 1980s, Gómez continued Cano's mission of aggressively investigating Pablo Escobar's connections with the Colombian government, at one point publishing a list of properties in Medellín that the drug lord secretly owned. He also expanded his reporting into coverage of the conflict with far-right paramilitary groups, such as Carlos Castaño's Peasant Self-Defense Forces of Córdoba and Urabá (ACCU). In September 1988, he was forced to flee the country after a firebombing of El Espectador's offices believed to be a retaliation for his reporting, but he returned nine months later. In 1989 alone, he reported on 36 separate massacres.

In 1996, Gómez co-founded La Fundación para la Libertad de Prensa (English: "The Foundation for Press Freedom"; abbreviated "FLIP"), a non-profit organization to protect threatened journalists. He also served as the group's executive director until 2001.

Gómez is best known for his coverage of the Mapiripán massacre, a "five-day killing spree" in July 1997 in which Colombian Army officers colluded with the United Self-Defense Forces of Colombia (AUC) to kill at least 49 people in the village of Mapiripán suspected of being guerrilla sympathizers. The killers used machetes and chainsaws, dismembering the corpses and throwing the pieces into the river. When Gómez broke the story of the Army's involvement in February 2000, he received 56 threats in the next two months. On 24 May, a group of men attempted to abduct Gómez as he was entering a taxi in Bogota, but he escaped. The next day, Gómez's colleague Jineth Bedoya was kidnapped, tortured, and raped; her kidnappers told her that they "planned to cut Gómez into tiny pieces". Amnesty International also issued a statement of concern for his safety, describing his case as "a clear example of the campaign of terror Colombian journalists are increasingly subjected to".

On 1 June 2000, Gómez left the country, moving to the U.S. state of Massachusetts, where he served for a year as a Nieman Fellow at Harvard University. He returned to Colombia in late 2001, becoming the Director of Investigations for the television news show Noticias Uno. After a report on links between presidential candidate Álvaro Uribe Vélez (who became President of Colombia later in the year) and the Medellín Cartel, Gómez was once again the target of death threats, along with news director Daniel Coronell and Coronell's three-year-old daughter, prompting Reporters Without Borders to issue of a statement of protest on their behalf.

On 24 May 2011, burglars tried to force their way into Gómez's home for the seventh time in ten years; noting the "sophisticated equipment" of the burglars, he attributed the attempted break-in to agents of Colombia's Administrative Department of Security.

In 2024, he was appointed director of the Noticias Uno newscast, replacing Cecilia Orozco Tascón.

== Awards and recognition ==
In 2000 Gómez was the recipient of the "Special Award for Human Rights Journalism Under Threat" at the Amnesty International UK Media Awards.

In addition to his 2001 Nieman Fellowship, Gómez was awarded the 2002 International Press Freedom Award of the Committee to Protect Journalists, "an annual recognition of courageous journalism". In the award citation, the CPJ praised Gómez's "exceptional commitment to truth and freedom". In 2010, Gómez's organization FLIP won the Missouri Honor Medal for Distinguished Service in Journalism, awarded by the Missouri School of Journalism.
