= El Espectador =

Colombian newspaper

- El Espectador front page, 18 September 2008 issue
- Type: Daily newspaper
- Format: Tabloid
- Founder: Fidel Cano Gutiérrez
- Publisher: Fidel Cano Correa
- Editor-in-chief: Élber Gutiérrez Roa
- Editor: Jorge Cardona
- Founded: March 22, 1887; 139 years ago
- Political alignment: Centre-left, Liberalism, Social liberalism
- Language: Spanish
- Headquarters: Calle 103 69B-43; Bogotá, Colombia
- Circulation: 50,000 (Mon–Sat); 190,000 (Sun)
- Price: $2,000(Mon–Sat) $3,700 (Sun)
- ISSN: 0122-2856
- OCLC number: 436626557
- Website: elespectador.com

El Espectador (meaning "The Spectator") is a newspaper with national circulation within Colombia, founded by Fidel Cano Gutiérrez on 22 March 1887 in Medellín and published since 1915 in Bogotá. It was initially published twice a week, 500 issues each, but some years later became a daily paper.

As the oldest newspaper in Colombia still in circulation, El Espectador is considered a newspaper of record for Colombia and a home for prominent writers, including the 1982 Nobel Prize Laurete Gabriel García Márquez. It is a member of the Inter American Press Association and the Asociación de Diarios Colombianos (ANDIARIOS). It defined itself as a "political, literary, news, and industrial newspaper".

In 2001, during a financial crisis, It transitioned into a weekly release, but reverted to a daily release on May 11, 2008, a comeback which had long been rumoured. With this change, it now utilized a 28 centimetres (11 in) by 39.5 centimetres (15.6 in) tabloid format. From 1997, the majority shareholder of El Espectador has been Valores Bavaria S.A., now known as Valorem S.A., a holding company controlled by the Santo Domingo family. The Cano family, founders of the newspaper, retained a small percentage amounting to less than 1%.

Since 2001, the paper has used the slogan "El Espectador. Opinion is news", implying it now focuses on opinion articles, as opposed to breaking news. This focus was kept when it regained its daily format on 2008.

According to the Estudio General de Medios, El Espectador had 687,900 weekly readers in 2007.

== History ==
Since its foundation in 1887, El Espectador acted as a speaker for the Colombian Liberal Party, at the time opposed to the administrations of the conservative regime.

Its motto was "El Espectador will work for the good of the country with liberal criteria and for the good of the liberal principles with patriotic criteria."

It was closed by authorities several times:

- 8 July 1887, by the Rafael Núñez administration, 134 days after its first issue, until 10 January 1888.
- 27 October 1888, by the then designated Carlos Holguín Sardi, until 12 February 1891; previously, the Catholic Church had forbidden its followers to read the newspaper, because of criticism of the lavishness of the Catholic Church in public celebrations made by its director.
- On 26 September 1892 the government fined the newspaper with $200.000 after considering one of its articles "subversive".
- 8 August 1893, by Antioquia governor Abraham García, until 14 March 1896. Fidel Cano Gutiérrez was jailed.
- On 27 June 1896, until 27 April 1897, due to a press law recently passed by the Congress.
- The outbreak of the Thousand Days War made El Espectador suspend its activities between 19 October 1899 and 16 October 1903
- On 17 December 1904 it was suspended again, after facing difficulties and opposing the Rafael Reyes administration. It appeared again on 2 January 1913, as an evening daily in Medellín.

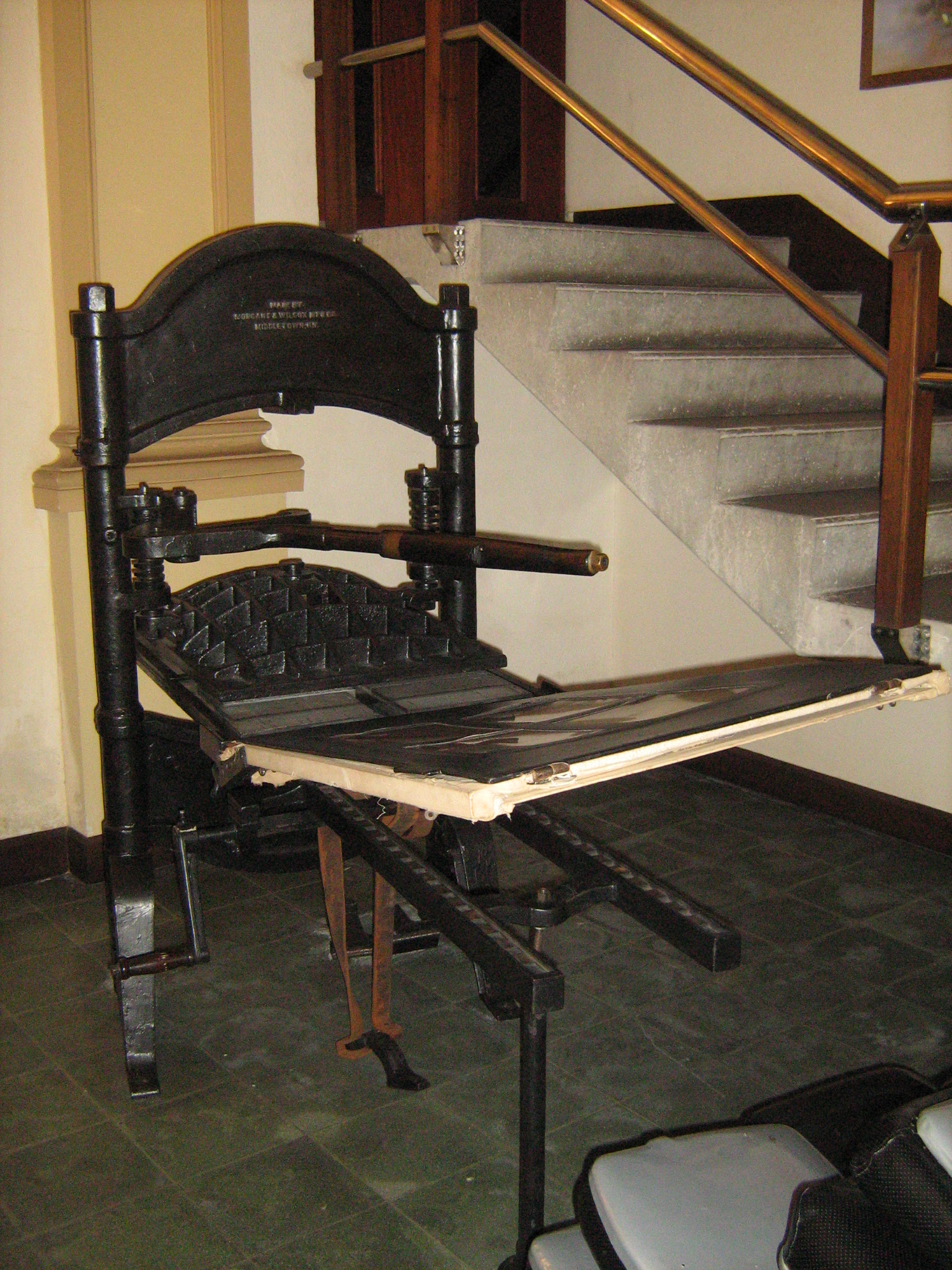
A Washington printing press where the first issue of El Espectador was printed in 1887, Museo Universitario, University of Antioquia, History Collection at San Ignacio Building, Medellín, Colombia

Since 10 February 1915 El Espectador has been simultaneously published in Medellín and Bogotá. Its Medellín edition was suspended on 20 July 1923.

In 1948, after the murder of Liberal Party leader Jorge Eliecer Gaitán, its circulation was suspended for three days. Since then, El Espectador has had to deal with the censorship of the then ruling Conservative Party several times. On 9 November 1949, Luis Cano Villegas, its director, resigned in protest for the seizure of the entire edition by the government, being replaced by his brother Gabriel Cano Villegas. On 6 September 1952, its facilities, then located in downtown Bogotá, as well as the building of competitor El Tiempo and the houses of Liberal Party leaders Eduardo Santos and Carlos Lleras Restrepo, were looted and partially destroyed, apparently with the tacit consent of the government. It reappeared on 16 September.

In 1955 the newspaper, outspokenly opposed to the military government of Gustavo Rojas Pinilla, publishing several articles by Alberto Lleras Camargo, with a substantial effect on public opinion. In December, the government accused El Espectador of several accounting and tax irregularities, and fined the newspaper $10,000 on 20 December 1955. On 6 January 1956 the National Taxes Direction imposed on El Espectador a fine of $600,000. Its directors, who were forbidden to respond to the accusations against the paper, suspended its publication that day.

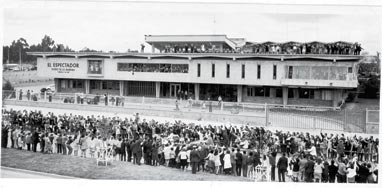
A blackout at El Espectador facilities

In order to replace El Espectador, on 20 February 1956 appeared El Independiente, directed by Alberto Lleras Camargo, who retired in April when the newspaper was closed for several months. It was published again in 1957 but due to an agreement by the opposition newspapers, it suspended its publication on 5 May. Five days later, Rojas Pinilla was ousted. El Independiente circulated until 31 May 1958. The next day, Jun 1, it was formally replaced by El Espectador.

On 6 September 1952, during the dictatorship of General Gustavo Rojas Pinilla, the newspaper's offices were attacked, ransacked, and set on fire; the paper resumed publication shortly after from borrowed premises.

In 1964 its headquarters moved from downtown to western Bogotá, on the avenida 68, the area becoming known as Avenida El Espectador. At the inauguration, its then director Gabriel Cano Villegas said: "if El Tiempo has the best corner in Bogotá, El Espectador has the best corner in the country."

Throughout the 20th century El Espectador was the main Liberal newspaper, with El Tiempo, both holding an important political influence. Among its main contributors it had some of the most important Colombian journalists at the time, like Luis Eduardo Nieto Caballero, Alberto Lleras Camargo, Eduardo Zalamea Borda, Gabriel García Márquez, Eduardo Caballero Calderón, Klim, Antonio Panesso Robledo, Inés de Montaña, Alfonso Castillo Gómez, José Salgar, as well as cartoonists Hernán Merino, Pepón, Consuelo Lago, and Osuna.

In 2007, its publisher Fidel Cano Correa said he did not agree with former President Álvaro Uribe Vélez's personal behaviour and government style, but he specified that was his own position and not the newspaper's.

== Journalism of ideas ==
During the 20th century, El Espectador criticized other mass media in Colombia, which preferred to remain silent instead of denouncing the atrocities happening in the country. In the early 1980s, the daily published several articles denouncing illegal loans and other irregularities allegedly performed by the Grupo Grancolombiano, one of the most powerful financial groups at the time. As retaliation, several big companies pulled their ads from the paper, which was already facing some financial issues. El Espectador disputed accusations made against it and dedicated an editorial piece to its credibility and the credibility of the financial groups.

El Espectador also demanded in its editorials freedom of the press and denounced the political censorship the independent media outlets had to deal with to avoid being closed, stating that "not even in the worst times of press censorship or political retaliation, some resorted to crime in order to silence the press, in one of its more noble and higher democratic functions." It recognized that in Colombia "the death penalty ordered and executed from the lowest social holes has become an habit, as a revenge against the work of social sanity the press is committed to." It concluded saying that "the feeling of siege and danger —on the press— would be negatively reflected on the whole democratic system."

The newspaper rejected being considered as "subversive opposition" and criticized Liberal president Julio César Turbay Ayala's government, which by its words wished to "have a totally loyal, extremely pro-government press, not silenced but flattering." To defend itself, the paper published 15 July 1979 a column named Si eso es opposición... ("If that's opposition...") In the same text, the newspaper declared itself "neutral", considering that a democracy should not be polarized, "because in the times we are living, newspapers are increasingly more independent from governments, more devoted entirely to report and guide according to their honest knowledge and understanding," adding that the "unanimous, one-way, uniformed, official press is (intended) for dictatorships and not for democracies... and we believe that Colombia is still a democracy."

El Espectador also criticized, openly, drug trafficking:

What this country really needs is not money, metal, pure materialism, but a deep resurgence of morals in both public and private sectors. Drug trafficking has corrupted us, the buying and selling of influence has corrupted us, the rush for easy money has corrupted us.
Guillermo Cano Isaza. Libreta de Apuntes. 12 January 1986

Our mafiosos find that the no-extradition (to United States) is their best life insurance, because they know that if they commit any serious or slight offences in Colombian territory, the generous cheque book or the sinister machine-gun, or the paid hit man, or the unscrupulous bodyguard willing to kill at the first chance, will keep them free enjoying their dirty, perverse fortune
Guillermo Cano. Libreta de Apuntes. August 1986

== Murder of Guillermo Cano ==
As stated before, El Espectador stood firm against drug trafficking and often published articles on related crimes.

On 17 December 1986, the then director of El Espectador, Guillermo Cano Isaza, was assassinated in front of the newspaper offices by gunmen paid by Pablo Escobar, after publishing several articles critical of Colombia's drug barons. Cano left the headquarters around 19:00 in his family's Subaru Leone After he made a U-turn on the Avenida El Espectador, one of the hitmen approached the wagon Cano was driving, shot him in the chest four times with an Uzi, and then fled on a motorcycle identified with the licence plate FAX84. Cano was 61 years old, and had been a journalist for 44 years. His murder is still considered unpunished. On December 18, 1986, and September 3, 1989 El Espectador's main headline was Seguimos adelante ("We are going on").

The World Press Freedom Prize, awarded annually by UNESCO since 1997, is named in his honour, for "his courage, his compromise with independent journalism and the tenacity with which he fought for his country", which "are an example for the rest of the world to follow. Guillermo Cano's fate exemplifies the price paid by journalists the world over in exercising their profession; journalists are imprisoned and ill-treated every day and the fact that these crimes, for the most part, go unpunished is even more alarming."

On 2 September 1989 the paper's offices were bombed by the Medellín Cartel. The blast occurred around 06:30; it blew the building's roof up, destroyed the main entry and affected the newspaper's production. The bomb was hidden in a van parked minutes before it exploded in front of the main entry. The same day, 6 armed men broke into an exclusive island in Islas del Rosario, near Cartagena de Indias, and set fire to the Cano family's summer house.

== Defence of the freedom of the press ==
On 29 May 2000 Reporters Without Borders issued a letter of protest to Interior Minister Humberto de La Calle Lombana, on the kidnapping of journalist Jineth Bedoya, at the time working for El Espectador, allegedly carried out by members of the paramilitary United Self-Defence Forces of Colombia (AUC). Robert Ménard, RWB's secretary general, "stated that he was "scandalised" by this latest attack on Bedoya". She would later join El Tiempo.

On 23 August 1999, a group called Colombian Rebel Army (ERC) published a communiqué issuing death threats against 21 personalities engaged in the then ongoing peace process, accusing them of "promoting war between Colombians". Among those personalities two El Espectador contributors were mentioned, Alfredo Molano y Arturo Alape. On 19 January 1999, Molano left the country (he would return years later). Molano had condemned the massacre of 130 people perpetrated weeks before by members of AUC commanded by Carlos Castaño, who had referred to Molano as "paraguerrilla". On 18 September, Plinio Apuleyo Mendoza, who had worked for El Espectador and RCN Radio, went into exile.

Between February and May 2000, journalist Ignacio Gómez received at least 56 threatening letters. In an article published by El Espectador, Gómez had revealed that the Mapiripán Massacre, in which 49 peasants were killed by paramilitary militias, had been supported by members of the Colombian Army. After escaping a kidnapping attempt in Bogotá on 24 May, Gómez sought refuge in the United States on 1 June 2000. He would return to Colombia one year later and become part of Noticias Uno TV newscast.

On 21 March 2003 columnist Fernando Garavito left Colombia for the United States, after several death threats. He denounced human rights violations by AUC, as well as the alleged tolerance on drug barons in the past by the then presidential candidate Álvaro Uribe Vélez. On 8 February 2003 photojournalist Herminso Ruiz was beaten and had his camera confiscated by members of the Colombian National Police while he was covering El Nogal club bombing. The incident was contempt by organizations as RWB.

In May 2003 the newspaper, through an editorial written by its then director Ricardo Santamaría, reported on "interference" on an investigation it was carrying on the alleged irregularities in Banco del Pacífico, claiming that Police intelligence officials had obtained access to a draft of the report and sent it, through the Colombian National Police director, Teodoro Campo, to the then Interior Minister Fernando Londoño, who was a chairman of the bank. Organizations defending freedom of the press expressed their contempt and their "deep concern". Campo denied any involvement, while minister Londoño claimed the draft was sent anonymously to him.

On 18 November 2004, a Bogotá court sentenced columnist and film director Lisandro Duque to three days in jail and a 470 euros fine, for not publishing a rectification after a sentence for defamation, when in column published 13 April 2003 Duque criticized Claudia Triana de Vargas, manager of a film production company. Instead of rectifying, Duque wrote in a piece published 7 September that he had "no enough evidence" to support his criticism. Duque appealed the court sentence.

== El Espectador in the 21st century ==
=== Presence on the web ===
Elespectador.com logo since March 2008

On 29 May 1996 the then daily newspaper launched its website elespectador.com. Its design format and layout have been changed several times In 2006 later added the .com to its logo, comments to the articles and user registration. Access hits to Elespectador.com grew 79% in 2007.

On 7 March 2008 elespectador.com was revamped, setting up four "editions": online, latest news, news map and print version. It also improved the registration system and the RSS feeds, and added tags, audio, and videos taken from Noticias Caracol, newscast from sister network Caracol TV, uploaded to its YouTube channel. The website is built with Drupal. Elespectador.com received the Colombian Chamber of Computing and Telecommunications's Premio Colombia en Línea 2008 award to the best online news website in the country.

In April 2016, the journalist Maria Paulina Baena and the journal's opinion coordinator Juan Carlos Rincón released La Pulla, a political and opinion journalism YouTube channel.

=== From daily to weekly ===
Despite El Espectador had been the Colombian newspaper with the second highest circulation, after El Tiempo, the financial difficulties worsened and in 1997 the Cano family sold most of their shares in Comunican S.A., El Espectador publishing company, to Julio Mario Santo Domingo, who at the time owned Cromos, Caracol Radio (later sold to Spanish group PRISA) and Caracol TV. Its headquarters moved to the Avenida El Dorado. In September 2001 El Espectador became a weekly newspaper.

RWB stated that "media diversity suffered a heavy blow" when the newspaper "downgraded itself to a weekly."

The Cali newspaper El País said: "El Espectador is a standard in defence of freedom, the fight against drug trafficking and corruption."

Since then, their editors Rodrigo Pardo, Carlos Lleras de la Fuente, Ricardo Santamaría, and Fidel Cano Correa tried to recover the financial balance and the newspaper's circulation. As a weekly, it was published on Saturdays, with Sunday's date. Counting with the free time readers have available on weekends, El Espectador focused on opinion, investigation, and analysis pieces, recovering its circulation, influence, and earnings.

In 2007 Fidel Cano Correa stated in an interview with Revista Semana that "[the return to a daily edition] is just a possibility. We have been doing very well during the last three years, especially the last one." The Spanish group PRISA was considered as a strategic partner, but the negotiation failed when Santo Domingo refused to cede the control of the paper to PRISA. On 11 May 2008 El Espectador became a daily again, changing from broadsheet to tabloid format.

As of 2024, El Espectador ranks as the second most consulted print media outlet in Colombia and the second most visited news website in the country, according to the annual Opinion Panel survey of Colombian opinion leaders.

=== Daily focus, supplements, and alliances ===
Every day of the week, except Sunday, El Espectador devotes around 10 pages to a specific "focus":

- Monday: Negocios (Business)
- Tuesday: Deportes (Sports)
- Wednesday: Internacional (World news)
- Thursday: Vivir (Living)
- Friday: Cultura (Culture)
- Saturday: Gente (People)

It also publishes three magazines, published once in a month each: Autos/Motos, Espacios, and Discovery Health. On Mondays El Espectador publishes a 6-page edition of The New York Times International Weekly, and on Tuesdays a two-paged Fox Sports minisection. It also syndicates articles from Harvard Business Review and El País.

=== Design ===
Since 2004, Lucie Lacava's Lacava Design has been in charge of El Espectador's design for its print edition. El Espectador uses Hoefler & Frere-Jones's Mercury and Gotham typefaces since then.

=== Current management and employees ===
El Espectador nameplate used throughout the 20th century, until 2000.

El Espectador nameplate used between 2000 and late 2002.

==== President ====
- Gonzalo Córdoba Mallarino

==== Publisher ====
- Fidel Cano Correa (2004–present)

==== Editorial board ====
- Héctor Abad Faciolince
- Ramiro Bejarano
- Alejandro Gaviria
- Armando Montenegro
- Pilar Reyes

==== Editors ====
- Angélica Lagos, editor-in-chief
- Laura Camila Arévalo, Arts and People.
- Fernando Garzón, Sports.
- María Alejandra Medina, International.
- Leonardo Rodríguez, elespectador.com
- José David Escobar, Investigations.
- María José Medellín, Crime and Law
- Daniel Valero, Politics
- Santiago La Rotta, Business
- Alex Marín, Bogotá
- Alejandra Ortiz, Género y Diversidad
- Sergio Silva, Salud, Educación y Ambiente

==== Regular columnists ====
===== Sunday =====
- Héctor Abad Faciolince
- Fernando Araújo Vélez
- Ramiro Bejarano Guzmán
- Mauricio Botero Caicedo
- Piedad Bonnet
- María Elvira Samper
- Juan Esteban Constain
- Humberto de la Calle
- Cristina de la Torre
- Lisandro Duque Naranjo
- Alejandro Gaviria
- Iván Mejía Álvarez
- Alfredo Molano Bravo
- Armando Montenegro
- Luis Fernando Montoya
- William Ospina
- Hernán Peláez Restrepo
- Hugo Sabogal
- Eduardo Sarmiento
- Harry Sason
- María Antonieta Solórzano
- Tola y Maruja
- María Emma Wills
- Felipe Zuleta Lleras

===== Monday =====
- María Elvira Bonilla
- Luis Carvajal Basto
- Roberto J. Camacho
- Álvaro Forero Tascón
- Germán González
- Salomón Kalmanovitz
- Lorenzo Madrigal
- Santiago Montenegro
- Mario Morales
- Mauricio Rodríguez
- Santiago Rojas

===== Tuesday =====
- Eduardo Barajas Sandoval
- Antonio Casale
- Tulio Elí Chinchilla
- Marcela Lleras
- Andrés Marocco
- Iván Mejía Álvarez
- Aura Lucía Mera
- Daniel Pacheco
- Hernán Peláez Restrepo
- César Rodríguez Garavito
- Reinaldo Spitaletta
- Rodrigo Uprimny

===== Wednesday =====
- Danilo Arbilla
- es:Fernando Carrillo Flórez
- Pascual Gaviria
- Hernán González Rodríguez
- Andrés Hoyos
- José Fernando Isaza
- Patricia Lara Salive
- Cecilia Orozco Tascón
- Hernando Roa Suárez
- Juan Pablo Ruiz Soto
- Arlene B. Tickner

===== Thursday =====
- Rodolfo Arango
- Luis Eduardo Garzón
- Gustavo Gómez Córdoba
- María Teresa Herrán
- Ana Milena Muñoz de Gaviria
- Rafael Orduz
- Ángela María Orozco
- Uriel Ortiz Soto
- Elisabeth Ungar Bleier
- Klaus Ziegler

===== Friday =====
- Ricardo Arias Trujillo
- Ana María Cano Posada
- Hugo Chaparro Valderrama
- Juan David Correa Ulloa
- Jorge Iván Cuervo R.
- Francisco Gutiérrez Sanín
- Esteban Carlos Mejía
- Mario Morales
- Lucas Ospina
- Mario Fernando Prado
- Yesid Reyes Alvarado
- Augusto Trujillo Muñoz
- Juan Gabriel Vásquez
- Carlos Villalba Bustillo
- Juan Villoro

===== Saturday =====
- Rocío Arias Hofman
- Juan Carlos Botero
- Diana Castro Benetti
- Manuel Drezner
- Mauricio García V.
- Julio César Londoño
- Adolfo Meisel Roca
- Sergio Otálora Montenegro
- Gustavo Páez Escobar
- Julián Posada
- Lola Salcedo Castañeda

==== Blog writers ====
- Tim Buendía
- Julián Andres Rivera Sulez
- Nicolas Acosta
- Julia Londoño
- Juan Herrera
- Gonzalo gGuerrero
- Joseph Aldemar Casañas Angulo

==== Syndicated columnists ====
- Paulo Coelho
- Umberto Eco
- Christopher Hitchens
- Nicholas D. Kristof
- Tomás Eloy Martínez

== Former Publishers ==
- Ricardo Santamaría (2003)
- Carlos Lleras de la Fuente (1999–2002)
- Rodrigo Pardo (1998–1999)
- Juan Guillermo Cano and Fernando Cano (1986–1997)
- Guillermo Cano Isaza (1952–1986)
- Gabriel Cano (1919 - 1923: Medellín edition; 1949 - 1958 Bogotá edition)
- Luis Cano (1919–1949)
- Fidel Cano Gutiérrez (1887–1919)

== See also ==
- El Mundo
- El Colombiano
- Semana
