= Guillermo Cano Isaza =

Colombian journalist (1925–1986)

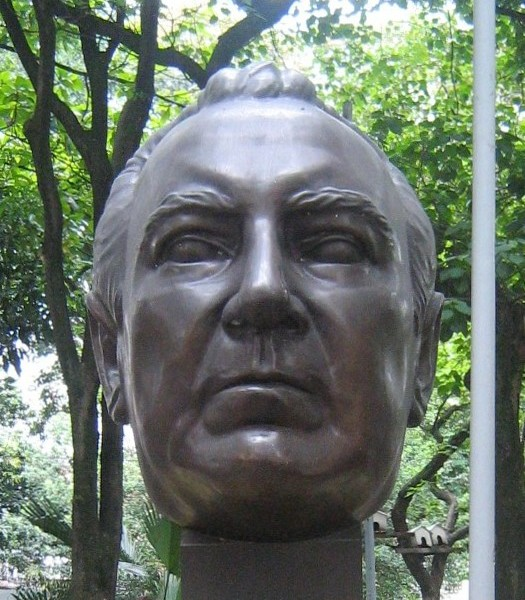
- Cano statue in Medellín
- Born: 12 August 1925; Bogotá, Colombia
- Died: 17 December 1986 (aged 61); Bogotá, Colombia
- Cause of death: Assassination
- Other name: Don Guille (Mr. Guille)
- Occupation: Journalist
- Years active: 1952–1986
- Notable credit: Editor of El Espectador
- Spouse: Ana María Busquets (m. 1953)
- Children: Juan Guillermo; Fernando; Ana María; María José; Camilo.
- Relatives: Fidel Cano Gutiérrez
- Family: Fidel Cano Gutiérrez (grandfather); Fidel Cano Correa (nephew); Luis Cano Villegas (uncle); Alfonso Cano Isaza (brother); Luis Gabriel Cano Isaza
- Awards: Maria Moors Cabot Prizes (posthumous 1987); International Press Institute World Press Freedom Heroes (2000)

Guillermo Cano Isaza (12 August 1925 – 17 December 1986) was a Colombian journalist. The editor of El Espectador from 1952 until 1986, he was assassinated in Bogotá in what was widely seen as an attack related to his criticism of Colombia's drug barons.

Guillermo Cano was the heir of Fidel Cano Gutiérrez, the founder of El Espectador. As a journalist, he had worked on the paper's bullfighting, sports, cultural and political sections. He had served as the editor of El Espectador from 1952 until his death.

Cano was editor of the newspaper El Espectador from 1950 to 1986, the second largest daily in his country and the oldest in circulation, which was owned by his family. He was the founder of the Sunday Magazine, executive secretary, co-editor with Gabriel Cano, and editor of El Espectador. In 1986, Cano received the CPB (Bogotá Journalists' Circle) National Journalism Award in the press category for his Sunday column "Libreta de Apuntes" (en:Notebook), whose topics ranged from recollections of prominent figures in the nation's life to critical commentaries on the country's problems. He was a soccer fan and a supporter of Independiente Santa Fe.

Cano clashed with prominent figures in the country due to his investigative journalism and his newspaper's support for liberal-leaning political and social causes, such as the war on drug trafficking led by Minister Rodrigo Lara Bonilla, Senator Luis Carlos Galán, and Police Colonel Jaime Ramírez; as well as the auto-loan scandal involving the Michelsen family and their conglomerate, Grupo Grancolombiano. He was assassinated by hitmen hired by Pablo Escobar for his fierce pursuit of drug traffickers from the Medellín Cartel, whom he had been exposing since 1983.

== Biography ==
Guillermo Cano Isaza was born in Bogotá on August 12, 1925, into a freethinking family of journalists. In his early youth—shortly after graduating from the Gimnasio Moderno in 1942—he joined the editorial staff of El Espectador, where he worked as a chronicler covering bullfighting, sports, horse racing, culture, and politics.

He served as a special correspondent at the 1972 Summer Olympics and wrote special reports on the events of "Black September," though this was not particularly significant.

=== The 1980s ===
In 1980, he was awarded the Simón Bolívar National Journalism Award for the life and work of a journalist. On the occasion of the centenary of the birth of Don Fidel Cano, founder of *El Espectador*, he wrote "The Grandfather I Never Knew." and for the commemoration of the 90th anniversary of El Espectador, he wrote "Postscript to the Autobiography of a Newspaper"—pages in which the sensitive writer and the veteran journalist come together.

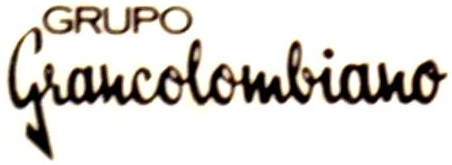
Logo of the Grancolombian business group.

In his editorials, he publicly denounced the financial crimes committed by the Grancolombiano Group, led by Jaime Michelsen Uribe. Although the group withdrew its advertising from the newspaper in protest, Cano continued to denounce the organization—which was ultimately taken over by the national government.

“...We do not sell, mortgage, or surrender our conscience or our dignity in exchange for a handful of the cash. That is not part of our budgets.”

— Guillermo Cano in his Sunday column, April 4, 1982.

However, Cano’s true ordeal unfolded—coinciding with his denunciations of the Grancolombiano Group—when, in 1982, Pablo Escobar, who was then serving as an alternate representative for Jairo Ortega, took his seat in the Congress of the Republic.

Following Minister of Justice Rodrigo Lara Bonilla publicly accused Escobar—without providing evidence—of being a drug trafficker and a financier of the paramilitary group MAS, Escobar and Ortega struck back. Escobar warned Lara to substantiate his accusations, under threat of a criminal lawsuit for slander and defamation; meanwhile, Ortega set a trap for Lara by revealing an alleged check from self-confessed drug trafficker Evaristo Porras, purportedly made out to Lara’s Senate campaign, a source alerted Luis de Castro, the judicial editor at the newspaper, that the newspaper had previously published information regarding Escobar’s background in drug trafficking.

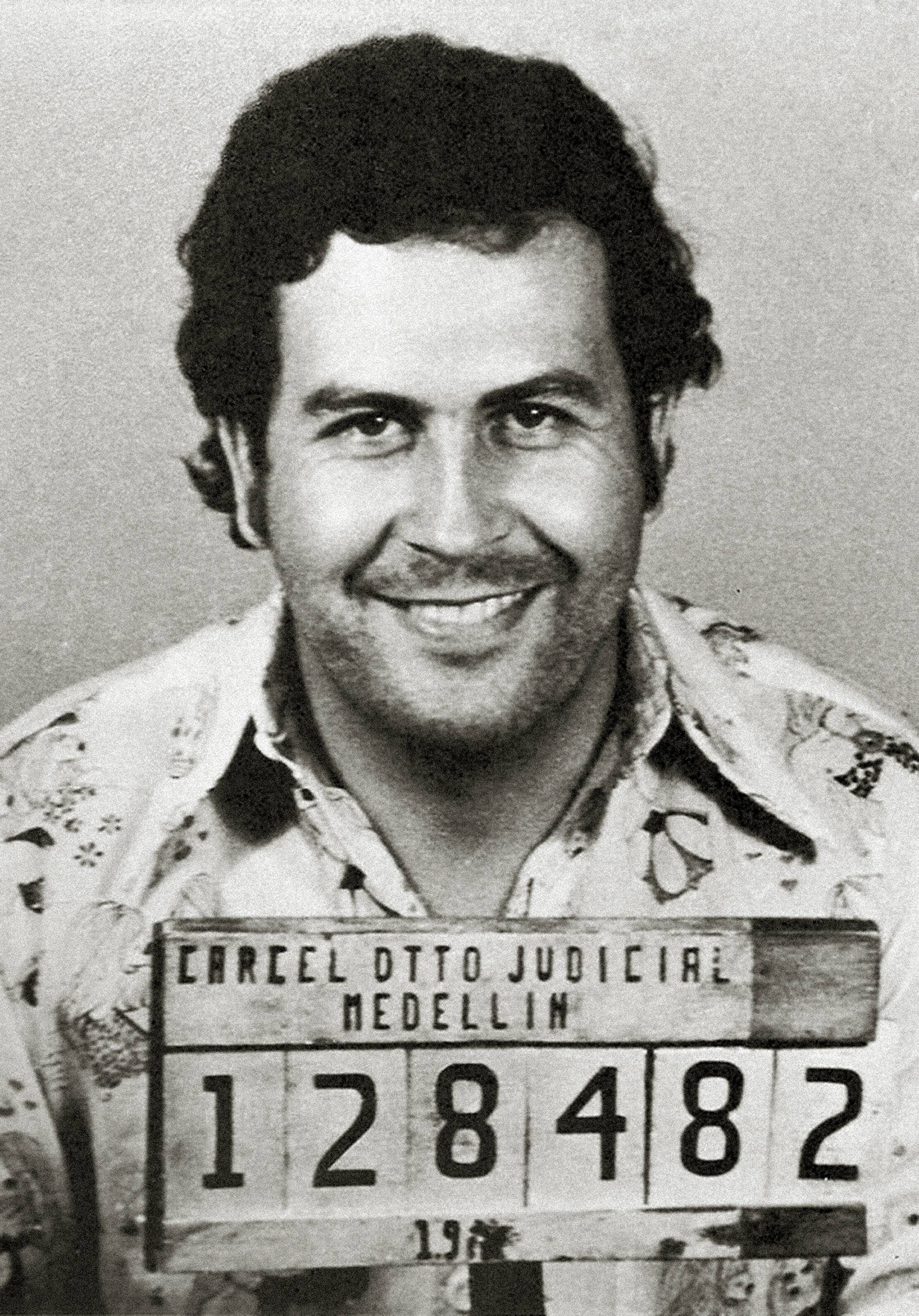
Mugshot of Escobar taken upon his 1976 arrest for cocaine trafficking—an image that brought his illicit activities to public attention in 1983.

Cano (who felt he recognized Escobar from the past), together with a little team of journalists (including María Jimena Duzán and Luis de Castro), delved into the newspaper’s disorganized archives until a month and a half De Castro found the evidence: on Friday, June 11, 1976, El Espectador had published a judicial report documenting how six drug traffickers had been arrested in Itagüí (Antioquia) with 39 pounds of cocaine paste. Among those detained were Pablo Escobar Gaviria and his cousin, Gustavo Gaviria Rivero. In its August 25, 1983, edition, El Espectador republished the 1976 report, documenting that Escobar indeed had a past linked to drug trafficking. Cano, together with investigative journalist Fabio Castillo and Hernán Unas (who corroborated the records at the DAS), unearthed the "smoking gun" against Escobar and his judicial past.

Two months later, Congress stripped him of his parliamentary immunity, and Judge Gustavo Zuluaga Serna issued an arrest warrant for him, accusing him of the murder of the two DAS agents who had captured him seven years earlier.

From then on, Cano publicly denounced Escobar and his associates in the Medellín Cartel; among his writings in his column, one piece stood out, titled "Where Are They—Why Can't They Be Seen?":

“More than a week ago, the House of Representatives—despite initial hesitation and delays—lifted the alleged parliamentary immunity that supposedly protected an individual named Pablo Escobar Gaviria, who had been—most unfortunately—elected as an alternate member of the Lower House on the same ticket as his protégé, Jairo Ortega. This Escobar Gaviria is currently facing legal proceedings for drug trafficking; furthermore, the Colombian justice system identifies him—along with his close cousin, Gustavo Gaviria—as the alleged mastermind behind the violent deaths of two security agents serving the Republic. Well over a month ago, another judge issued an arrest warrant for an individual of the same ilk and with the same unscrupulous habits as the Escobar Gaviria cousins: the druglord Carlos Lehder, who is implicated—both within and beyond our borders—in the crime of trafficking narcotics and amassing wealth through this abominable and criminal profession.”

— Guillermo Cano in his Sunday column, November 6, 1983.

His final editorial, titled "The Mobsters' Party Was Spoiled" (a clear allusion to President Virgilio Barco’s move to revive extradition via administrative channels), sealed his death sentence.

=== Death ===
“While there are phenomena that fuel discouragement and hopelessness, I do not hesitate for a moment to point out that the Colombian spirit will be capable of moving toward a more egalitarian, just, honest, and prosperous society.”

— Final editorial signed by Guillermo Cano, published on December 17, 1986.

Cano, who had received death threats, declined to have bodyguards or private security—not wanting to risk the lives of others to safeguard his own—and on Tuesday, December 16, 1986, he gave his final interview to journalist Cecilia Orozco, notable for his remark: "I leave the newspaper office at night, and I don't know what might happen."

On Wednesday, 17 December 1986, shortly after 7:00 p.m., as Guillermo Cano Isaza was leaving the offices from El Espectador in his a wine-red Subaru Leone with license plate AG 5000, which Cano was driving, the hitmen waited for him to make a U-turn on 68th Avenue, known as El Espectador Avenue and fired eight shots into his chest with a submachine gun. Jorge Elí Pabón, alias "El Negro Pabón, one of two hitmen acting under orders from "Los Priscos"—a group of criminals in the service of the Medellín Cartel— on a motorcycle across the street at a stoplight opened fire at Cano with an Uzi, murdered Cano causing him to lose control of the car and crash into a light pole. The hitmen quickly fled the scene and he was rushed to a hospital where he died shortly before 7 pm. It was assumed that the attack was in response to a campaign Cano had launched in the paper years earlier to denounce the influence of drug traffickers in the country's politics. Three years later, El Espectador's building was destroyed with a 300-pound bomb, and the Cano family summer house in Rosario Islands was burned down.

=== Court case ===
On March 19, 1989, the lawyer for the Cano family, Héctor Giraldo Gálvez, was murdered in Bogotá by hitmen from the Medellín Cartel.

In an October 1995 ruling, nine years after the murder, María Ofelia Saldarriaga, Pablo Enrique Zamora, Carlos Martínez Hernández, and Luis Carlos Molina Yepes were found guilty of conspiracy to commit the crime and sentenced to 16 years and 8 months in prison. However, in another ruling on July 30, 1996, the Superior Court of Bogotá overturned the verdict, acquitting all of them of charges in the crime, except for Molina Yepes, who was the only one convicted and who had only recently been captured on February 18, 1997. On appeal the convictions of all but Molina were overturned. Previously, Pablo Escobar, Evaristo Porras, Gonzalo Rodríguez Gacha, and Molina Yepes himself, all leaders of the Medellín Cartel, had been considered the masterminds.

According to a report published in December 2007 in El Espectador, after Pablo Escobar's death in 1993, some of the hitmen who worked for him, such as Jhon Jairo Velásquez, aka "Popeye," revealed details of the drug lord's organization's involvement in this crime. During the investigations, 12 people were murdered, including a magistrate, a judge, and a lawyer representing the civil party. The only person who has been held legally accountable for the crime is Luis Carlos Molina Yepes, who paid the hitmen who murdered Cano. Molina Yepes appears in the investigation linked to Carlos Alberto Gaviria Vélez, brother of José Obdulio Gaviria, who was a presidential advisor to Álvaro Uribe Vélez and cousin of the deceased drug lord Pablo Escobar. Molina Yepes served only six years in prison. These revelations prompted the resignation of the ambassador in London and former minister Carlos Medellín, who is married to one of Cano's daughters.

Decades later, 'Popeye', was who paid the money to Los Priscos and coordinated their activities after the death of John Jairo Arias Tascón, aka "Pinina," testified that the murder of Cano Isaza was personally carried out by Jorge Pabón, alias "El Negro Pabón," Pablo Escobar's top hitman in Bogotá, and that it was a particularly easy operation. This revelation came in the context of the false implication of a man named Jorge Argiro Tobón, whom other executive and judicial authorities had identified as the perpetrator and arrested by the DAS after being mistaken for Jorge Elí Pabón, according to ongoing investigations. Jhon Jairo Velásquez Vásquez, alias "Popeye," presented a photograph showing him socializing with Jorge Elí Pabón, alias "El Negro Pabón," and Carlos Mario Arzate Urquijo, alias "El Arete," and stated that Pabón carried out the murder because he was Escobar's highest-ranking man and his fury against the director of the newspaper El Espectador warranted it. The police identified the perpetrator of the crime as a certain Jorge Tobón or Pabón and therefore proceeded to incriminate a citizen with the surname Tobón who had nothing to do with it and who only had a similar surname.https:// Pabón was an assassin working for Escobar, and it was because of him that the war against the so-called Cali Cartel began. Otoniel De Jesús González Franco, alias "Otto," and Valásquez, alias "Popeye," confirmed that the perpetrator was Jorge Elí Pabón and not Jorge Argiro Tobón. Finally, Jorge Tobón proved his innocence and was released, while Jorge Pabón could not be prosecuted, as he was murdered in 1988 by the Cali Cartel in Panama. The Council of State ordered that compensation be paid to Tobón.

Cano was 61 years old at the time of his murder, 44 of which he had dedicated to journalism at El Espectador. To this day, his murder is considered to remain unpunished.

== Family ==
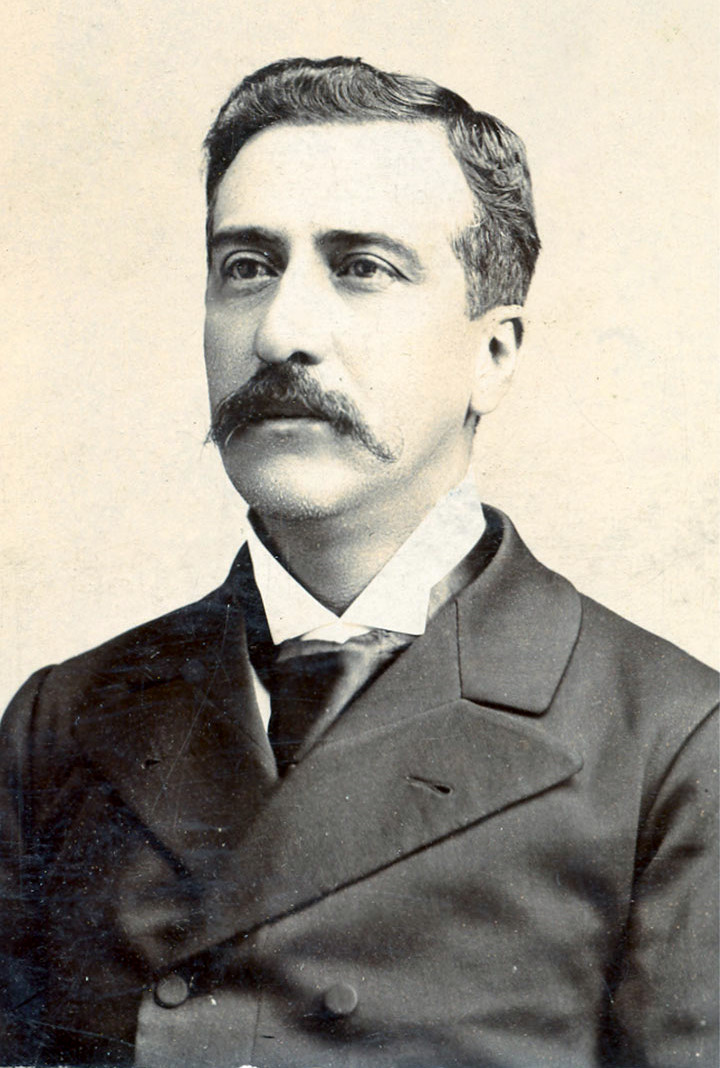
Cano's grandfather, Fidel Cano, founder of his family's newspaper.

Guillermo Cano Isaza was a member of a Bogota aristocratic family with Antioquian origins. His parents were the journalist Gabriel Cano Villegas and Luz Isaza Restrepo, and his brothers were Luis Gabriel, Alfonso, and Fidel Cano Isaza, who were also journalists and were known along with Guillermo as "The Four Aces of El Espectador."

His father was the son of journalist and founder of the family newspaper, Fidel Cano Gutiérrez, who served as Minister of the Treasury under President Jorge Holguín Mallarino in 1909; his mother was María Elena de Jesús Villegas Botero. His father was the brother of journalist and liberal politician Luis Cano Villegas, who was married to one of the sisters of Luis and Agustín Nieto Caballero, influential writers and co-founders of the Gimnasio Moderno school along with Daniel Samper Ortega. The Nieto family were cousins of Eduardo and Lucas Caballero Calderón, and of journalist Cecilia Caballero Blanco, wife of former President Alfonso López Michelsen.

His brother Fidel was the father of journalist Fidel Cano Correa, who is the current director of the family newspaper. One of his cousins was also a journalist, Elena "Nena" Cano Nieto.

== Legacy ==
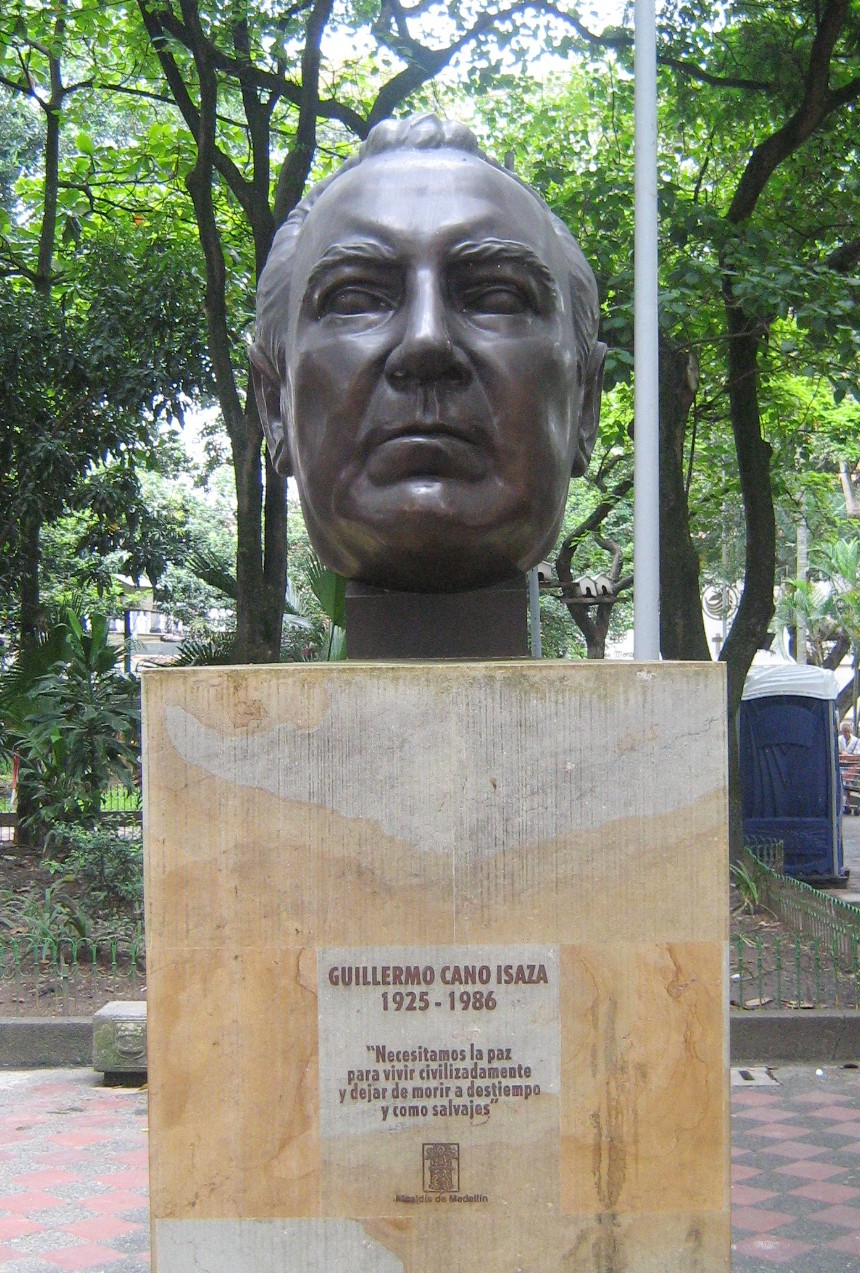
A bust of Guillermo Cano, made by Rodrigo Arenas Betancourt.

One day after the assassination of its director, El Espectador ran the headline on its front page Seguimos Adelante (en:"We keep going,") which would become the constant throughout all the following years.

In 1987 a bust of Cano was erected in his memory. It was bombed that same year and also in 1988. Years later, it was restored.

His career-long commitment to diversity of opinion and the circumstances of his death - he had called for firm measures to be applied against drug traffickers - symbolise the price paid by journalists throughout the world to violence.

In 1997, UNESCO created an annual prize that bears his name—the UNESCO/Guillermo Cano World Press Freedom Prize—which serves to honour a person or institution that has done outstanding work in defending the freedom of the press. In 2000, he was named one of International Press Institute's 50 World Press Freedom Heroes of the 20th century.

With the death of Cano, in an unprecedented event in the Colombian press, the newspapers El País, from Cali; El Colombiano, from Medellín; El Heraldo, from Barranquilla; and El Tiempo and El Espectador, from Bogotá, among others, offered their investigative journalism units to form a working group that would jointly denounce those behind the drug business, which was called The United Front, which also, in solidarity with El Espectador, held a silent protest against the violence against journalists.

These media outlets produced joint reports denouncing acts of terrorism and the drug trafficking mafia that had infiltrated the political establishment. Despite its initial strength in 1988, the alliance crumbled after repeated threats against its members.

That day, Ana María Busquets de Cano, widow of Don Guillermo Cano, and the members of the board of directors of the Bogotá Journalists' Circle, along with journalists, union members, students, businesspeople, and employees, organized the March of Silence to demand freedom of the press and of expression in Colombia. This is how the event is described:

“From the very first minutes after Cano's death, Yamid Amat, who directed the news division of Caracol Radio; Juan Gossaín, of RCN; and Jaime Zamora Marín, director of the now-defunct Sutatenza network, spearheaded the "chain of solidarity": a joint broadcast about the repercussions of the assassination. The radio stations linked up, and at 11:00 p.m. on Thursday, December 18, an hour before the start of the Day of Silence, RCN, Caracol, Todelar, Grupo Radial Colombiano, Súper, Sutatenza, and Melodía broadcast a special program together, which opened with the National Anthem of Colombia. Unforeseen and unexpected, a media bloc emerged, in which the journalistic community acted in unison. The now-defunct state-owned Inravisión, through one of its channels, joined the initiative and aired an interview that Cecilia Orozco Tascón conducted with Guillermo Cano 24 hours before his assassination. “You know when you leave home, but you don’t know when you’ll get back,” the director of El Espectador had said. Amat and Gossaín offered a retrospective of Guillermo Cano’s life and work. Five minutes before midnight on Friday, December 19, the networks signed off, and the last words heard were: “The country we seek is a good country.””

— Live. Unisabana. Tatiana Guerrero Suárez, Deputy Editor. Live

==== Merits received ====
- In 1987, as a posthumous tribute, he received the Maria Moors Cabot Prize for his contribution to inter-American journalism.
- National Journalism Prize of Colombia in 1986 for his articles against drug trafficking.
- He received posthumously the “Rodrigo Lara Bonilla” Gold Category medal for his decisive contribution to regional development and the United Nations International Press Service.
- He also won the Postobón Sports Journalism Award in 1988 for his chronicles in El Espectador and the International Red Cross medal.

==== CEDID Guillermo Cano Isaza School ====
It is a primary and secondary school with 2 shifts, morning and afternoon, founded in February 1987, located at Cra. 16a #62 - 35 South, Tunjuelito, Bogotá.

==== Guillermo Cano Foundation ====
On December 17, 1996, the tenth anniversary of the journalist's assassination, his descendants created a non-profit foundation, which bears his name, with the aim of "working in defense and promotion of press freedom in the world as well as improving the quality of journalism."

The foundation, based in Bogotá, aims to do the following:

- To continue the work cut short by the assassination of Guillermo Cano Isaza and to ensure that his work, committed to peace and freedom of expression, spreads throughout the world.
- To promote and disseminate work that fosters the understanding of journalism that characterized Guillermo Cano Isaza during his professional career. Likewise, to establish awards in this regard.
- To support journalists who are threatened in the exercise of their profession and for their actions in defense of freedom of expression, as well as their families.
- To create lines of research and specialized publications in the field of communication, specifically journalism.

The foundation was a fundamental pillar in achieving Resolution 29, "Condemnation of violence against journalists," adopted by the United Nations General Assembly.

== In media ==
Cano is portrayed by the Colombian actor Germán Quintero in the TV series Escobar, el patrón del mal.
