= San Juan Nepomuceno, Bolívar =

Coordinates: 9°57′N 75°05′W

- Municipality and town
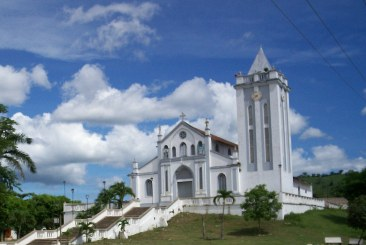

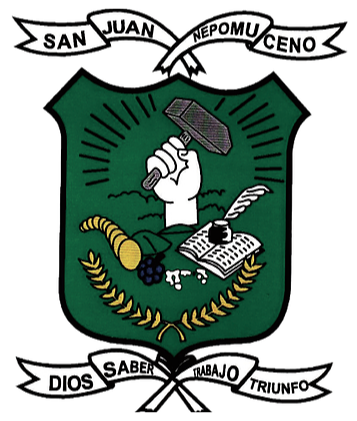
- Coat of arms

- Location of the municipality and town of San Juan Nepomuceno, Bolívar in the Bolívar Department of Colombia
- Country: Colombia
- Department: Bolívar Department

Area
  - Municipality and town: 631.2 km^{2} (243.7 sq mi)
  - Urban: 3.89 km^{2} (1.50 sq mi)

Population (2020 est.)
  - Municipality and town: 38,529
  - Density: 61.04/km^{2} (158.1/sq mi)
  - Urban: 28,513
  - Urban density: 7,330/km^{2} (19,000/sq mi)
- Time zone: UTC-5 (Colombia Standard Time)

San Juan Nepomuceno is a town and municipality located in the Bolívar Department, northern Colombia. It is named after Saint John of Nepomuk.

== Notable residents ==
Mayerlis Angarita was born here in about 1980. She has won awards for her leadership on women's rights and she has been a mayoral candidate. Artist Gabriel Sierra was born in 1975 in San Juan Nepomuceno.
