= Gustavo Gómez Córdoba =

Colombian journalist and writer (born 1967)

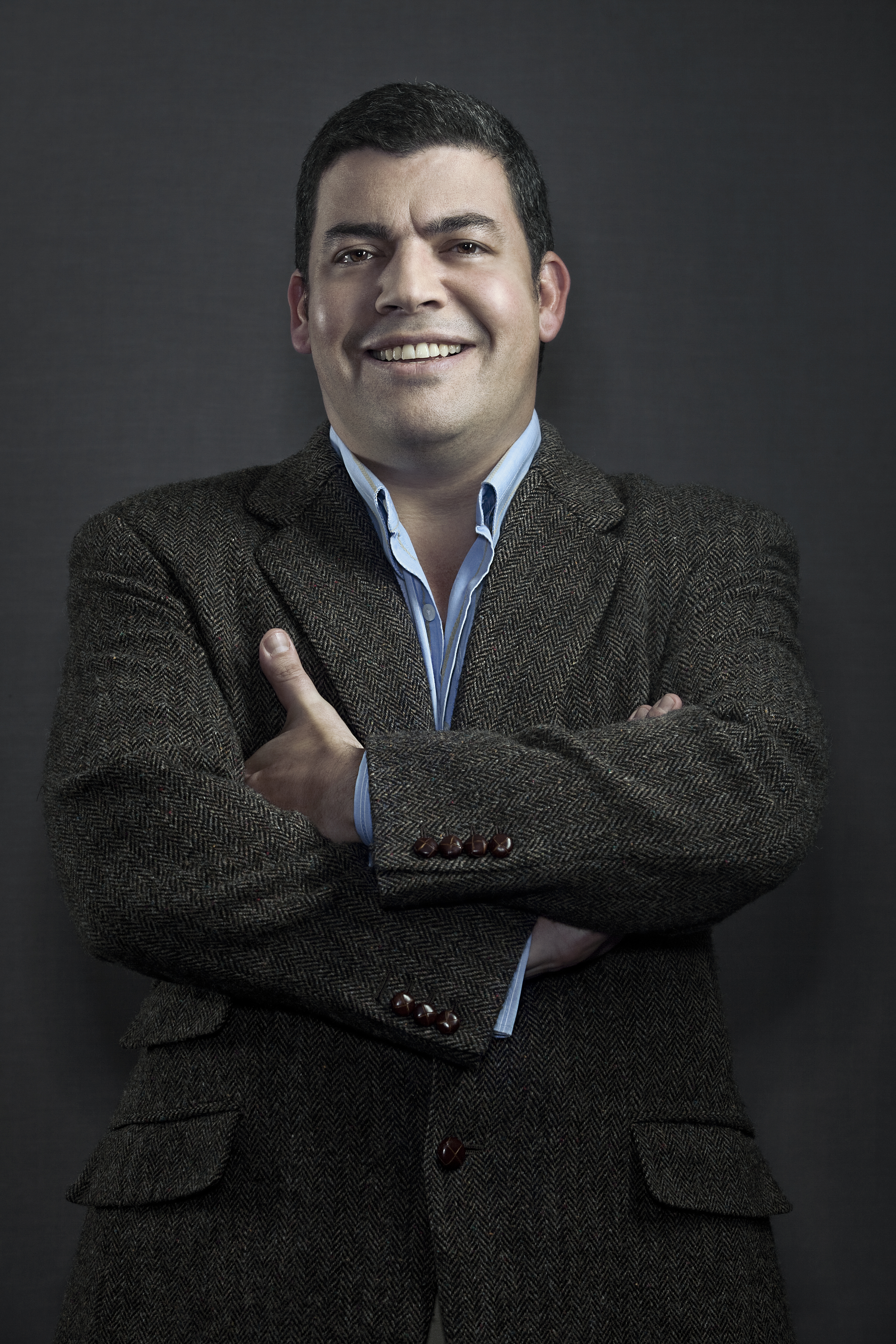
- Born: Gustavo Ernesto Gómez Córdoba; November 7, 1967 (age 58); Medellín, Colombia
- Education: Pontifical Xavierian University
- Occupation: Journalist
- Years active: 1995–present
- Employer: Caracol Radio
- Known for: Television/Radio personality
- Awards: Journalist of the Year - National Journalism Awards 'Simón Bolívar' (2010)

Gustavo Ernesto Gómez Córdoba (Medellín, 1967) is a Colombian journalist and writer, whose work has been recognized with awards including Journalist of the Year in 2010. He began working in Cromos magazine in the 1990s and became prominent as a national radio broadcaster starting in 2005, when he joins the team of 6AM Hoy x Hoy from Caracol Radio. He also writes for SoHo magazine and another significant media.

== Career ==
He started law school, but in his 4th year of studies he switched to the social communication program at the Pontifical Xavierian University in Bogotá. One of his first jobs was for Cromos magazine, where he became general editor; he also worked for SoHo magazine under the same job for the editions in Colombia, Ecuador and Costa Rica, and currently works as columnist of said magazines.

He also worked as a writer and programmer for the radio station Javeriana Estéreo, communications adviser of the Ministry of Government and of the Department for State Modernization during president Gaviria's government; team member of the T.V. show produced by Caracol Televisión El Radar as interviewer and wrote a chronicles section called Me cogió la tarde con…, for the El Espectador newspaper. He also was director and writer for the T.V. magazine De Paso in Señal Colombia channel.

He writes on a regular basis for magazines like Semana, Bocas, Billboard, Diners, El Malpensante, Kinetoscopio, Lámpara, Semana Books (Arcadia), Fucsia, Plan B and the radio show "Efectos Secundarios" (Caracol Radio Miami), directed by José Antonio Ponseti. He was also a writer for the T.V. Shows "Yo, José Gabriel" and "Crónica Urbana" for the Bogotá City Government.

=== Radio ===
He worked alongside Julio Sánchez Cristo in the RCN Radio radioshow La F.M., and was a culture editor in the now defunct radio network r@dionet, directed by Yamid Amat. In 2005 he joined the staff of the Caracol Radio's morning news show 6AM Hoy por Hoy, as a member of a team directed by Darío Arizmendi. From 10:00 to 12:00 (UTC−5) he takes over as director of the show.

Established now as one of the most influential journalists in Colombia, he's been called "The revelation of the Colombian radio in the last 10 years". In December 2011, Caracol Televisión offered him the News Director position in place of Darío Fernando Patiño, he declined in order to spend more time with his family.

=== Writer ===
Known as well for being a collector of random and rare things, like funny and smart quotes published in mass media and books, he wrote a compilation book called Palabras Prestadas (Colombia described in phrases from the mass media - Editorial Aguilar) in 2004 and Frases de Ataúd (Journal short notes about current issues). He also published The Beatles/Versiones Libres (research about the music and history of the band), El mundo según John Lennon (Thoughts from the ex beatle in accurate definitions), 41 mil palabras sobre Colombia, el dinero, el sexo, la masturbación, el infierno, los bebés, el periodismo, la pereza, el fútbol y Twitter (alternate dictionary) and Uribe es la suegra de Santos (Compilation of aphorisms from Camilo Durán Casas).

== Awards ==
- Simón Bolívar National Journalism Awards - Journalist of the Year (2010)

== Notable works ==
- Frases de Ataúd. 1995. ISBN 978-958-33-0228-2.
- Palabras Prestadas. 2004. ISBN 9789587041873.
- 41 mil palabras sobre... 2012. ISBN 978958422921-2.
- Uribe es la suegra de Santos. 2012. ISBN 9789584232212.
