= La Pulla =

YouTube program

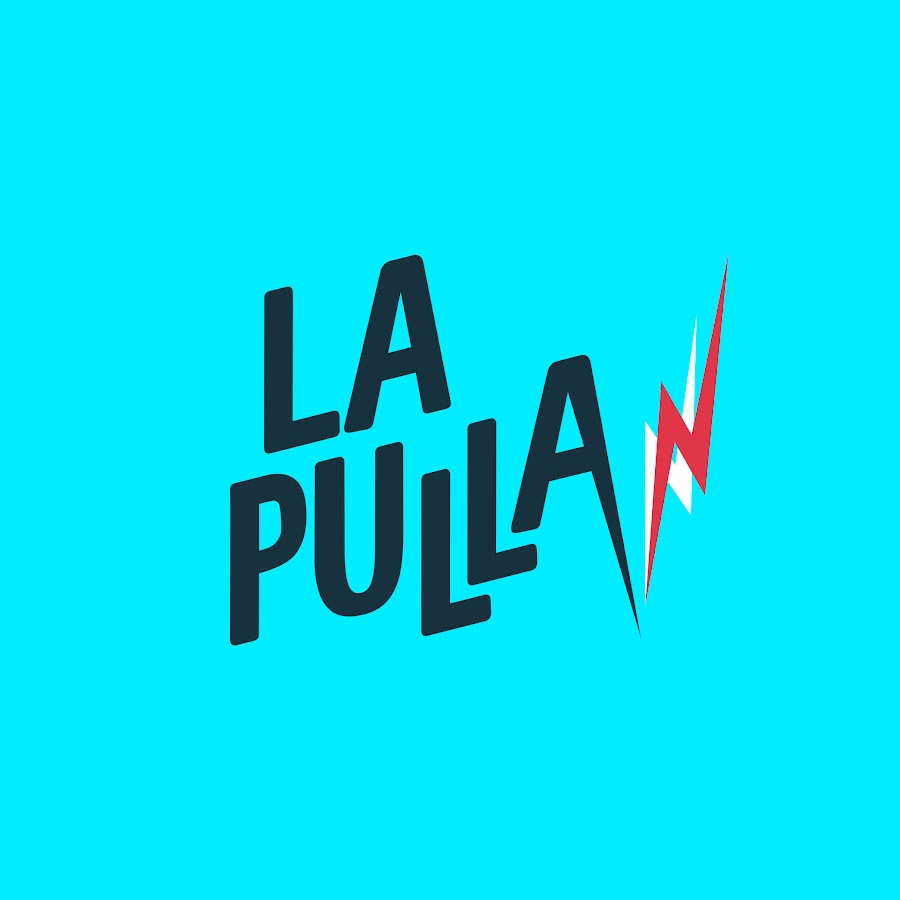
- Logo since 2023

YouTube information
- Channel: La Pulla
- Years active: 2016-present
- Genres: Political and opinion journalism
- Subscribers: 1.42 million
- Views: 223.4 million
- Last updated: May 25, 2026
- Website: Official website

La Pulla is a Colombian political, humorous and opinion journalism program on YouTube, owned by the national newspaper El Espectador. Created by María Paulina Baena, Juan Carlos Rincón, Daniel Salgar, Santiago La Rotta and Juan David Torres, it is hosted by Rincón and was formerly hosted by Baena.

== History ==
La Pulla's YouTube channel began in April 2016. In a June 2016 interview with Semana, Maria Paulina Baena, presenter of the program, said that Juan Carlos Rincón, then El Espectador's opinion coordinator, was thinking of a video editorial with "a different tone". She was hired by El Espectador after receiving a mail which asked her to introduce herself in two castings. In the same interview, Baena said that she and her team, led by Rincón, thought of names for the program like Los Indignados or Los Emputados, but they selected La Pulla because that name "fit with the insolent and vehement tone we wanted".

In 2016, La Pulla uploaded a video called "Ahora resulta que si hay apagón va a ser culpa nuestra" (Now it turns out that if there's a [national] power cut it's gonna be our fault) in the context of the 2015-2016 energy crisis of Colombia caused by El Niño. The Colombian government made a response to the video called La Contrapulla.

On the eve of the 2018 Colombian presidential election, La Pulla made a video called "Gustavo Petro NO merece ser presidente" (Gustavo Petro does NOT deserve to be president). The video was strongly criticized by the followers of La Pulla, with one of the most notable criticisms made by YouTuber Lalis Smil, who started the video saying that "When [La Pulla] says that [Petro] is a despot, selfish and more, it is just talking about his personal manner of being. I've seen Gustavo hugging indigenous [people], kids, recyclers. I don't think in any moment he has been acting like a despot, or hitting somebody on the head".

On December 6, 2018, Santiago Rivas Camargo, presenter at the time of a program called Los Puros Criollos, broadcast on the free-to-air public TV channel Señal Colombia, made a video with La Pulla called "ÚLTIMA HORA: la ley que van a aprobar a escondidas" (BREAKING NEWS: the law they will approve on the quiet) where they criticized the TIC law, a proposed law that they described as "ending public television in Colombia". A few hours after La Pulla published the video, Rivas reported on the social media website Twitter that Juan Pablo Bieri, business manager of RTVC (operator of Señal Colombia) at the time, decided to remove Los Puros Criollos from Señal Colombia's dayparting. The decision was understood by the fans of Los Puros Criollos and La Pulla as "a way to censor Rivas as punishment for participating in the La Pulla video". After the furor, in January 2019, Bieri announced his intention to resign from the business manager position of RTVC, which was accepted on February 1, 2019.

In 2020, La Pulla uploaded a video sponsored by Carros más Seguros called "¡CUIDADO! Nos están vendiendo carros peligrosos" (CAUTION! They are selling us dangerous cars) where they said that the Mazda 2 model sold in Colombia (one of the ten most sold cars in the country) did not meet the global minimum security standards for cars. Nobuyuki Sato, president of Mazda Colombia, sent a letter to La Pulla asking for an apology. In the letter, he stated that the Mazda 2 model shown in the video was sold in Mexico, not in Colombia. La Pulla, in response to the letter, changed the description of the video by adding an apology clarifying that the Mazda 2 model shown in the video was not sold in Colombia, but in Mexico. The company responded a couple days after the La Pulla apology, stating that "For Mazda of Colombia, the security of their cars is a priority", showing the technical data of the Mazda 2 model in Colombia.

In March 2021, Cali's mayor Jorge Iván Ospina accused the program on Twitter of slandering him after they released a video criticizing his administration. Ospina said he did not see the video before writing the accusations and he would not see it anyway, he explicitly said on a Tweet "I'm not gonna watch the so-called Pulla for the sake of my mental health". The program responded to Ospina saying that "He did not see the video, but he knows it has obliques and calumnies".

In December 2022, Baena, the main face of the program up until that moment, announced she would part ways with El Espectador and would thus leave La Pulla, leaving Rincón to host the program by himself.

== Reception ==
Daniela Cristancho Serrano from Directo Bogotá, a magazine owned by the Pontifical Xavierian University, said that La Pulla "uses colloquial language, irony, and dramatization [for their videos]" and said that the team of the program is "irreverent."

The program has been criticized on social media for its vulgar tone. In an article published in April 2017 by Nathalia Acero in the section El librepensador of the website of the Universidad Externado de Colombia called "Lo malo, lo bueno y lo bien feo de La Pulla" (The bad, the good, and the very ugly of La Pulla), she states:

There are some users on social media whose argument is that La Pulla is not a good journalism; they underline that the way María Paulina Baena expresses herself not just deviates from the standards of "good" journalism, but also just "screams out" the news, rather than just telling them.

=== Awards ===
- (2016) Premio Nacional de Periodismo Simón Bolívar for Opinion and analysis in television.
- (2023) Premio Nacional de Periodismo Simón Bolívar for Opinion and analysis in video.
- (2024) Premio Nacional de Periodismo Simón Bolívar for Opinion and analysis in video.
