= Mayerlis Angarita =

Colombian women's rights activist

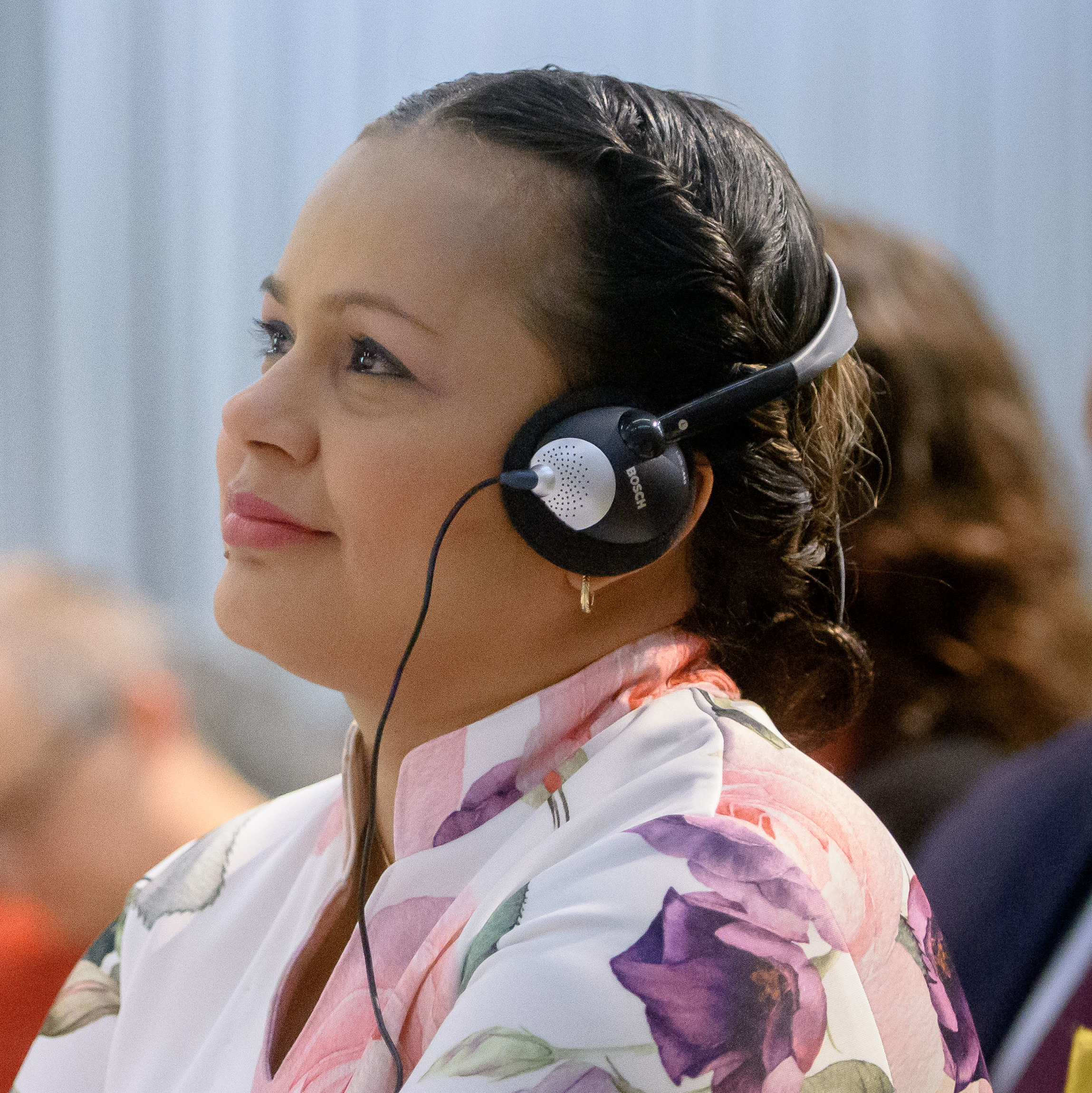
- Born: c.1980 San Juan Nepomuceno, Bolívar
- Known for: human rights activist

Mayerlis Angarita Robles is a human rights activist. After her mother disappeared in Colombia's civil conflict, her father went into exile. Angarita has worked for women in the victims of conflict and founded an organization called Narrate to Live. She works closely with UN Women.

== Life ==
She was born in about 1980 in San Juan Nepomuceno in the Bolivar regain of Colombia. From an early age, she took her own views. She cut her own hair at the age of five so that she could have her hair the way she wanted it. She liked soccer and despite her father's ambition that she should be a secretary, she decided that she wanted to work in the law. When she was fifteen her uncle was murdered and her mother, Gloria Robles Sanguino, "disappeared". Her father moved but this created problems for her because those who had been displaced were given little respect.

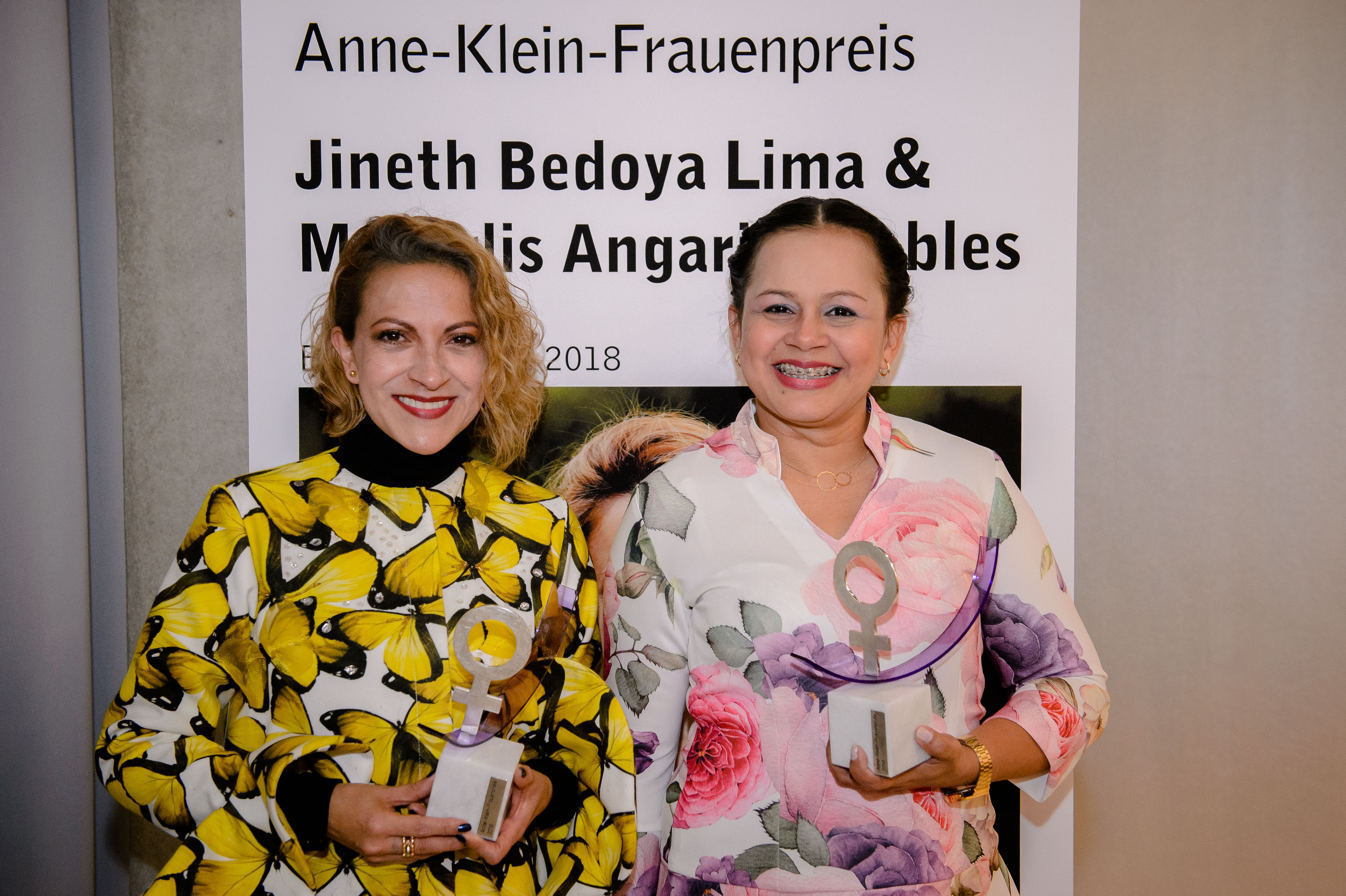
Angarita and Jineth Bedoya Lima at the Anne Klein Women's Awards.

She created the organization Narrar para Vivir (Narrating to Live) on 26 March 2000. She was moved to do this a month after seeing the aftermath of the Macayepo massacre. Since that time women in the organization have been assaulted dozens of times and she was attacked three times up to 2018.

In 2018 she was awarded the Anne Klein Women's Award. She won the award jointly with Jineth Bedoya Lima who is also a Colombian. They do not work together but they were both concerned about the plight of women and girls during the conflict.

On International Women's Day (8 March) in 2021 Mayerlis Angarita was given the International Women of Courage Award from the US Secretary of State, Tony Blinken. The ceremony was virtual due to the ongoing COVID-19 pandemic and it included an address by First Lady, Jill Biden. After the award ceremony all of the fourteen awardees were able to take part in a virtual exchange as part an International Visitor Leadership Program. Unusually another seven women were included in the awards who had died in Afghanistan.
