= Eduardo Sarmiento =

Cuban artist

Eduardo Sarmiento (born 1980 in Cienfuegos, Cuba) is a Cuban-American artist working in the mediums of painting, drawing, design, and illustration.

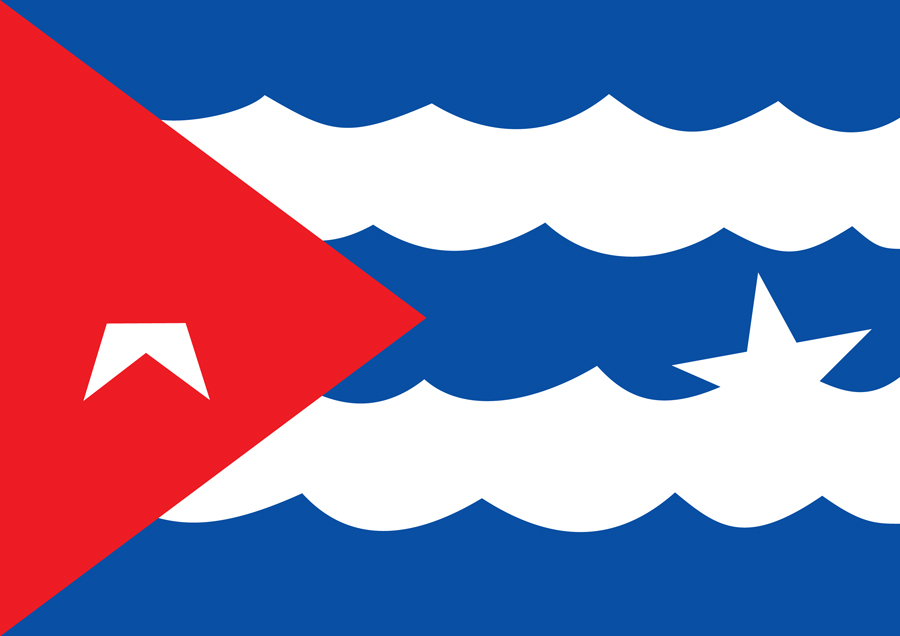
Eduardo Sarmiento - Poster Malecon, designed 2002, printed 2012

== Early life ==
Eduardo Sarmiento was raised in the rural town of Rodas, in the province of Cienfuegos, Cuba, where he developed an interest in drawing very early in life.

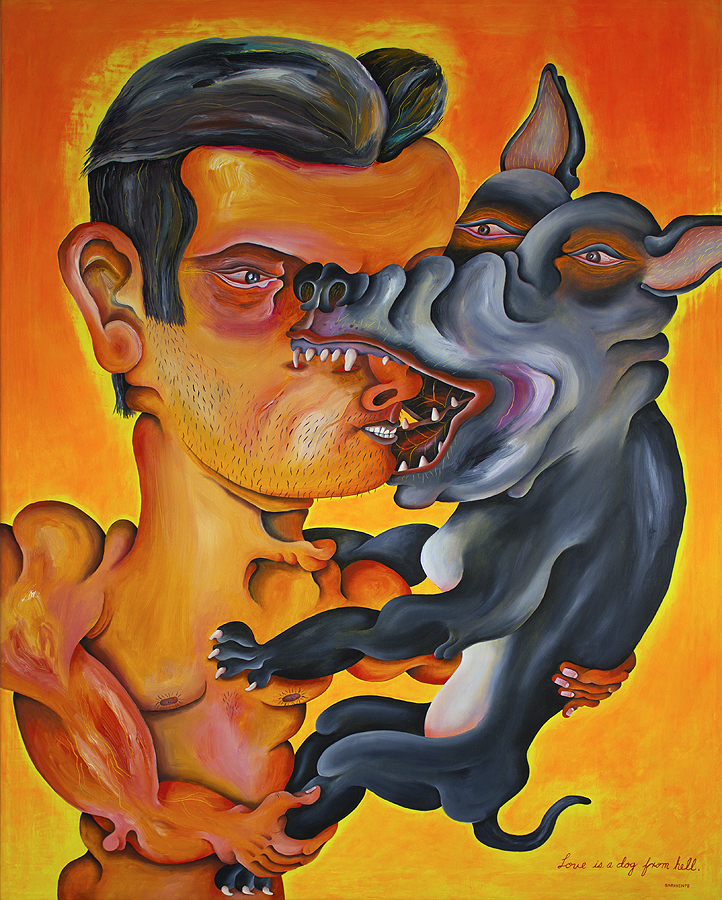
Eduardo Sarmiento - Love is a Dog from Hell II, 2012

At the age of 18, he left his natal Cienfuegos for the capital, the City of Havana, to pursue graphic arts studies at the Superior Institute of Design (ISDI). He graduated with honors and worked as an adjunct professor for a period of time at the institute. A landmark in his career happened when he co-founded, along with Nelson Ponce and other ISDI colleagues, the Camaleón collective which was known by many public artworks such as a mural in the University of Havana's Communications Faculty, another at G Café, the literary hangout of the city, and one at the Design Department of Casa de las Americas.

Sarmiento illustrated several books some of which earned him several prizes and the recognition of the biggest figures in design in Cuba, until he left for Miami, Florida, where he currently lives and works.

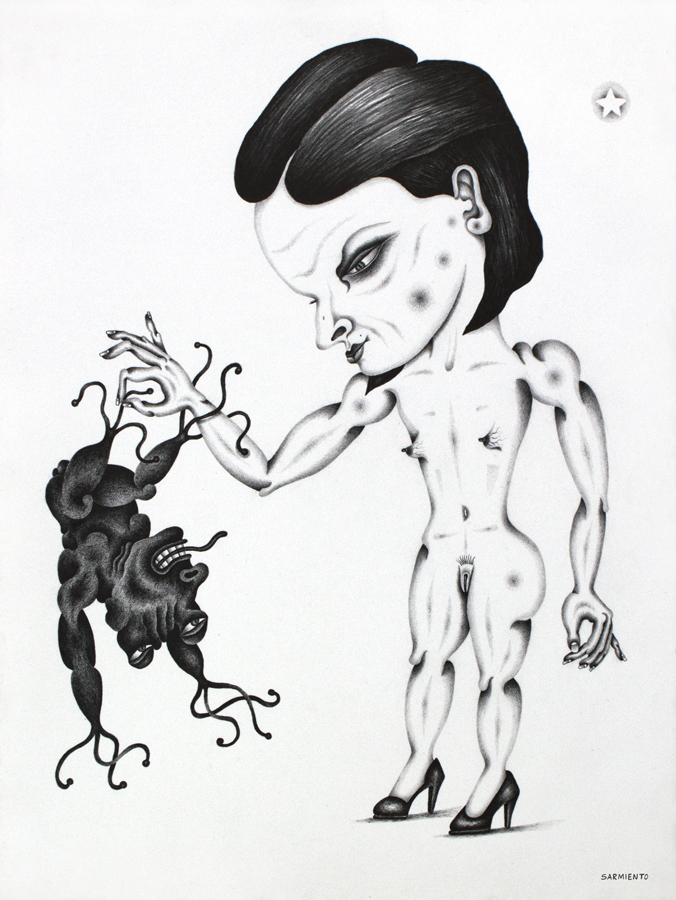
Eduardo Sarmiento - Provocando el Deseo, 2012

== Work ==
Upon his arrival in Miami, Eduardo Sarmiento has had his work featured in publications such as The New York Times, ESPN magazine, the Texas Monthly, The Miami Herald, Miami New Times, among others.

″Explosive colors, explosive eroticism, excellent technique and the desire for endless possibilities propels the work of Eduardo Sarmiento″. Art Critics have categorized it as Fauvism, Pop Art, and others, as cited by the Miami New Times, refer to it as something of an ″aftermath if Satan, Salvador Dalí, and Gary Baseman got together to chew peyote, watched schlocky horror movies on repeat, and play "cadavre exquis" for 69 hours straight″.

Of Sarmiento's paintings Janet Batet, an independent art critic and curator wrote:

From the formal standpoint, the work of Sarmiento is strident. Colors scream. The glowing orange, yellow and red, far from toning down with the blue and purple, spread out in their entire splendor tempting us to contagious. There is much of the French Fauvism in these explosive colors where dare is essential. Then, the semantic analogy emerges: Fauve in French means wild beast. The capricious detail becomes an indispensable key for the understanding of Sarmiento's artwork that is mostly a unique bestiary through which the artist recreates mythological characters inspired in our daily life: The truth to our innermost fantasies and desires. (Janet Batet, 2010)

== Awards ==
- 3x3 Magazine Professional Show 2012
- American Illustration 30
- Society of Illustrators 2012

== Exhibitions ==
Eduardo Sarmiento's work is being shown at the Museum of American Illustration in New York City and was recently part of the exhibition "Independiente" at the Espacio La Crujía in Oaxaca, México, and also as part of the LA to LA exhibit at the LA Artcore Center in Los Angeles, California. It has also been exhibited in the United States at Edge Zones Gallery, Harold Golen Gallery, among other spaces.

== Collections ==
- Lowe Art Museum. University of Miami, FL.
- Museum of Latin American Art (MoLAA). Long Beach, CA.
- Raclin Murphy Museum of Art. University of Notre Dame, IN.
- Museum of American Illustration. New York, NY.
