= Julián Posada =

Yale professor

- Title: Assistant professor of American Studies

Academic background
- Education: Sorbonne University (maîtrise); School for Advanced Studies in the Social Sciences (master's); University of Toronto (PhD)

Academic work
- Discipline: Information science
- Institutions: Yale University
- Main interests: Digital labor Digital ethics Science and technology studies
- Notable works: Platform Extractivism (2026)
- Website: posada.website

Julián Posada is an information scientist and assistant professor of American studies at Yale University. His research examines human labor in the production of artificial intelligence, particularly outsourced data work in Latin America. He is the author of Platform Extractivism: Data Work and the People Powering Artificial Intelligence (2026).

== Education and career ==
Posada earned a maîtrise in the humanities from Sorbonne University, a master's degree in sociology from the School for Advanced Studies in the Social Sciences, and a doctorate in information science from the University of Toronto. He joined Yale as an assistant professor in July 2023, where he also co-directs the certificate in Computing, Culture, and Society.

His dissertation, The Coloniality of Data Work: Power and Inequality in Outsourced Data Production for Machine Learning, received an honorable mention in the Association of Internet Researchers' 2023 Best Dissertation Award. In 2024, he was selected for the Social Science Research Council's 2024-2026 Just Tech fellowship cohort.

== Research ==
Posada studies the organization of human labor behind artificial intelligence, particularly data annotation in Latin America. His research on Venezuelan data workers examines platform control over working conditions and the household arrangements that sustain online work. His findings describe data work as a household activity: family members may take turns using a computer or perform domestic labor that enables others to work longer hours. He has also documented families sharing platform accounts with children, allowing minors to undertake data-labeling tasks despite platforms' age restrictions.

With Milagros Miceli, Posada coauthored the 2022 paper "The Data-Production Dispositif", which examines how clients' task instructions, working conditions, and platform interfaces shape data annotation. They argue that these arrangements constrain workers' ability to question instructions and interpret data independently. The paper received an honorable mention, Impact Recognition, and Methods Recognition at the 2022 ACM Conference on Computer-Supported Cooperative Work and Social Computing. Subsequent researchers have drawn on Miceli and Posada's data-production dispositif framework in other research contexts. For example, Mihai Băcăran used the concept to examine the alienation of AI transcription workers, while Beatriz Palacios Abad and colleagues drew on the framework to analyze power, transparency, and worker visibility in the repair of U.S. broadband maps. In research on participatory data annotation, Yujia Gao and colleagues also discussed the framework when examining the recognition of data annotation workers' labor and expertise.

His public commentary has addressed the recruitment of speakers of underrepresented languages to produce AI training data.

His research forms part of the literature on labor conditions and data production referenced in international AI policy reports and United States government guidance, including the Global Partnership on Artificial Intelligence's AI for Fair Work Report and the National Institute of Standards and Technology's AI Risk Management Framework Playbook. He was also among the experts consulted for Engineered Precarities, a 2026 report published by the Deutsche Gesellschaft für Internationale Zusammenarbeit on algorithmic management in data work and content moderation.

=== Platform Extractivism ===
In Platform Extractivism: Data Work and the People Powering Artificial Intelligence (2026), published by the University of California Press, Posada examines three platforms operating in Venezuela's data-work sector. He argues that their business models exploit economic insecurity and unequal international labor relations, connecting the organization of AI data production to histories of colonialism and resource extraction. He discussed the book and Venezuelan data workers on Democracy Now! in August 2026.

== Selected publications ==
- Posada, Julian (2026). Platform Extractivism: Data Work and the People Powering Artificial Intelligence. University of California Press. ISBN 9780520413634.
- Miceli, Milagros; Posada, Julian; Yang, Tianling (2022). "Studying Up Machine Learning Data: Why Talk About Bias When We Mean Power?". Proceedings of the ACM on Human-Computer Interaction. 6 (GROUP) 34: 1–14. arXiv:2109.08131. doi:10.1145/3492853.
- Miceli, Milagros; Posada, Julian (2022). "The Data-Production Dispositif". Proceedings of the ACM on Human-Computer Interaction. 6 (CSCW2) 460: 1–37. doi:10.1145/3555561.
- Posada, Julian (2024). "Deeply embedded wages: Navigating digital payments in data work". Big Data & Society. 11 (2) 20539517241242446. arXiv:2403.01572. doi:10.1177/20539517241242446.
