= Eduardo Caballero Calderón =

Colombian journalist and writer

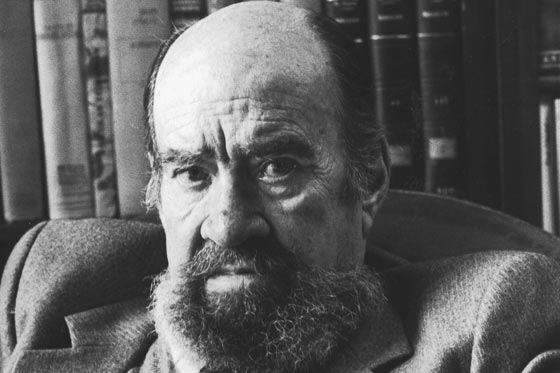
Eduardo Caballero Calderón

Eduardo Caballero Calderón (6 March 1910 – 3 April 1993) was a Colombian journalist and writer. As a journalist, he worked for the main Colombian newspapers, including El Tiempo and El Espectador. Also he was a diplomat from Colombia in Peru, Argentina, Spain and France. Caballero was elected as congressman two times for the department of Boyacá and was mayor of Tipacoque.

Cabellero Calderón began writing in the 1940s and rose to prominence in the 1950s and 1960s. His most known books are El Cristo de espaldas (Backwards Christ) (1952), Siervo sin tierra (Landless Servant) (1954), La penúltima hora (The Hour Before the Last) (1955), and Manuel Pacho (1962), which are mainly depictions of events related to the bipartisan violence in Colombia (La Violencia). Other works are Cain (1969), El buen salvaje (The Good Savage) (1963), a book that won the Nadal Prize in 1965 and Historia de dos Hermanos (Two Brothers' History) (1977) among others.

Although Caballero is one of the most recognized Colombian writers, his writing is mainly focused on essays, as shown in the next fragment extracted from his short story "Tale of Little Princess Isabel" written for the teaching of history to children:

" Desde hace un tiempo vaga por los caminos de Europa, golpeando a las puertas de los poderosos, un hombre alto de cuerpo, rubicundo, pecoso, de ojos encandilados por una extraña quimera. Este hombre que digo es dueño de un secreto que desempolvó en pergaminos italianos y conoció de labios de marinos portugueses. Cuando pasó una noche en el convento de La Rábida a donde llegó a pedir posada por el amor de Dios, le dijo al prior: Puesto que la tierra es redonda, si contorneamos el mar tenebroso en dirección al poniente, por fuerza hemos de llegar al fabuloso reino de las especies. "

Translation:

"A long time ago, a tall, red faced, freckled man with eyes brightened by a weird chimera was knocking on the doors of the powerful ones. This man held a secret he discovered in ancient Italian parchment scrolls and written in the language of Portuguese seamen. One night when he begged for lodging at La Rabida Monastery appealing to their sense of pity, he said to the prior: given that the earth is round, if we go around the fearsome sea that lies towards the west, we will arrive eventually at the fabulous kingdom of spices."

== Works ==
- ¿Por qué mató el zapatero? (1941)
- El arte de vivir sin soñar (1943)
- Suramérica tierra del hombre (1944)
- El nuevo príncipe (1945)
- Ancha es Castilla (1950)
- El Cristo de espaldas (1952)
- Siervo sin tierra (1954)
- La penúltima hora (1955)
- Manuel Pacho (1962)
- Memorias infantiles (1964)
- El buen salvaje (1963), novela con la que obtuvo el Premio Nadal en 1965
- Caín (1969)
- Azote de sapo (1975)
- Historia de dos Hermanos (1977)
- Hablamientos y pensadurías (1979)
- Tipacoque de ayer a hoy (1979)
- La historia en cuentos: El Almirante niño, El Rey de Roma, El Caballito de Bolívar.

== See also ==
- Literature of Colombia
