= Rodrigo Uprimny =

Colombian jurist

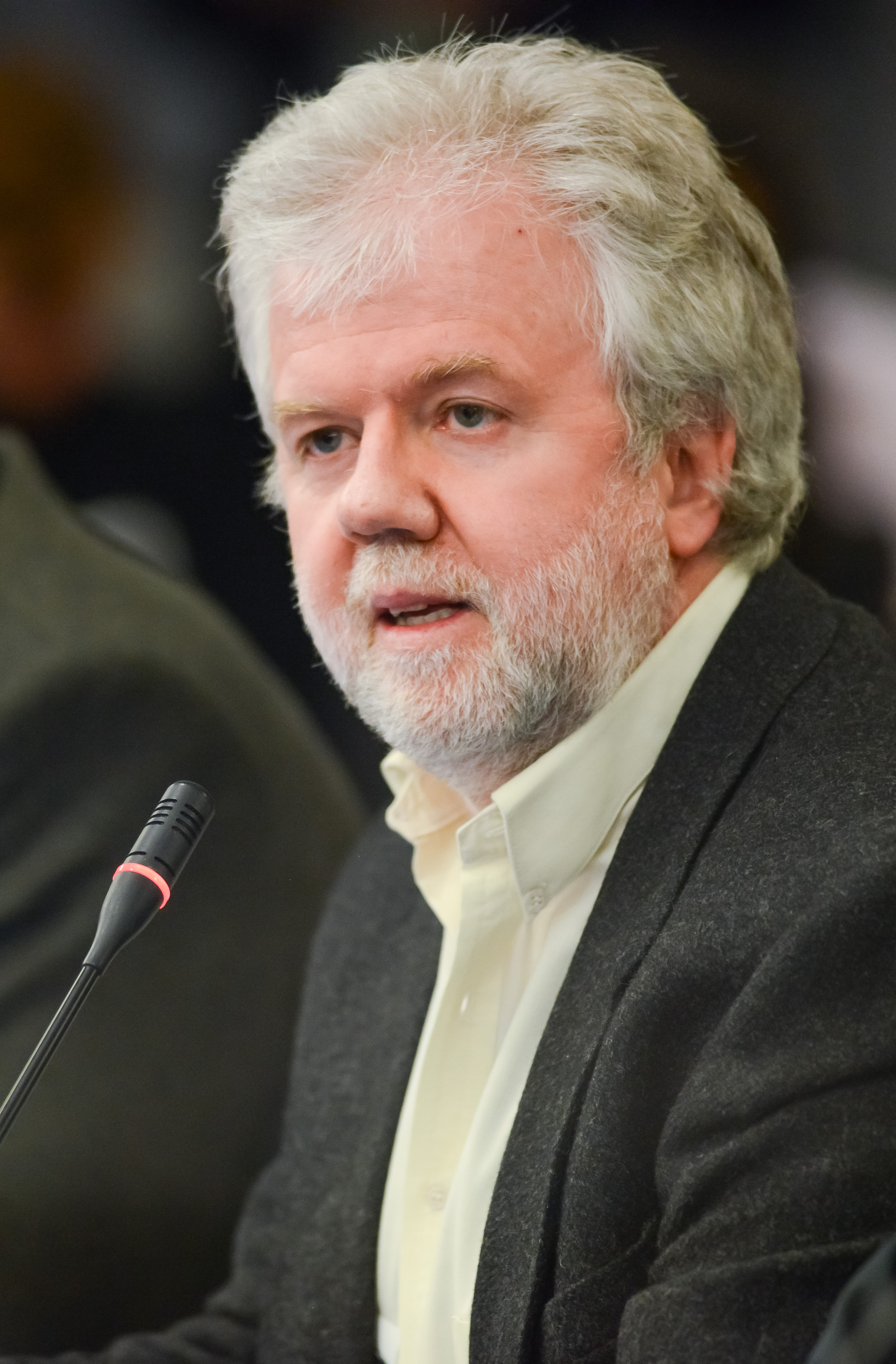
- Born: Rodrigo Uprimny Yepes; April 13, 1959 (age 66); Bogotá, Colombia
- Occupation: Jurist

Rodrigo Uprimny Yepes (born April 13, 1959) is a Colombian legal scholar. He is currently a member of the United Nations Committee on Economic, Social and Cultural Rights and the International Commission of Jurists. He is a researcher at Dejusticia, an NGO he directed for ten years. He writes for the Colombian newspaper El Espectador.
