= Fidel Cano Gutiérrez =

Colombian journalist

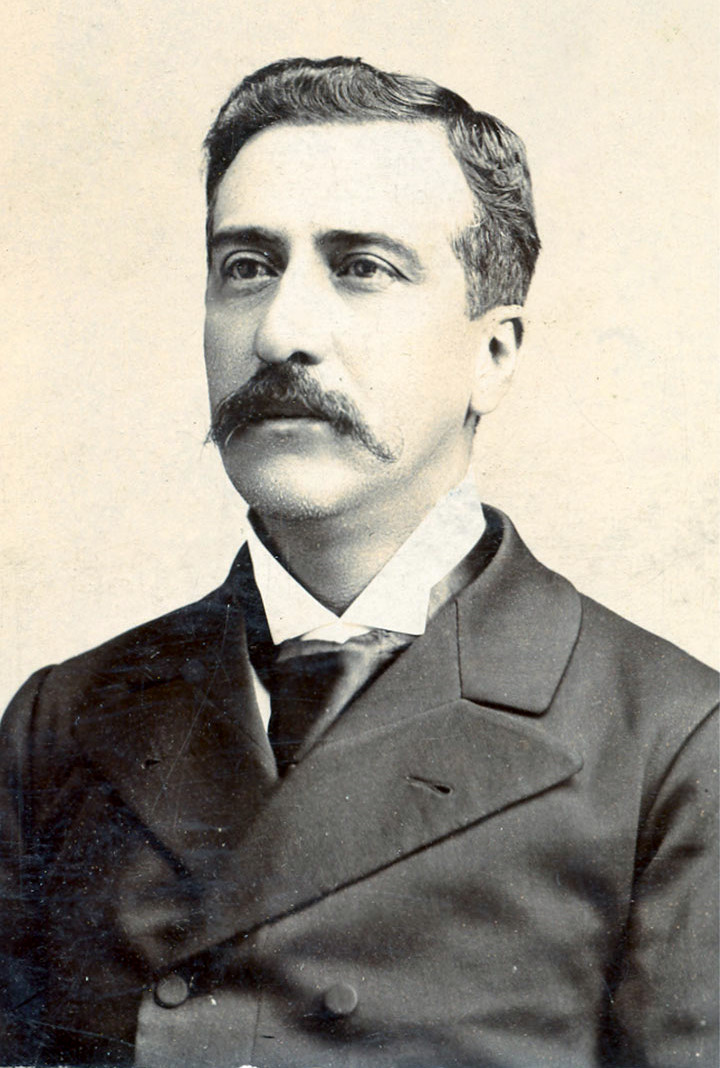
- Born: 17 April 1854; San Pedro, Antioquia, Republic of New Granada
- Died: 15 January 1919 (aged 64); Medellín, Antioquia, Colombia
- Resting place: San Pedro Cemetery Museum
- Occupations: Journalist, politician
- Notable credit(s): El Espectador; Founder and director (1887–1917)
- Spouse: Helena Villegas Botero

Fidel Cano Gutiérrez (1854 in San Pedro, Antioquia – 1919 in Medellín) was a Colombian journalist, founder of El Espectador, Colombia's oldest newspaper.

Cano attended high school at Colegio de Jesús in Medellín, then studied at the Colegio del Estado, which would become University of Antioquia. He worked at La Palestra, a literary newspaper, in 1872. Five years later he would become the editor of La Idea. In 1879 he moved to Medellín. On 22 March 1887 he founded El Espectador, whose circulation was suspended 6 times by the conservative government, which considered it as "subversive". Cano, as the editor, was jailed several times.

Cano also was director of the Official Printing Office, member and president of the Academia Antioqueña de Historia, deputy to the Antioquia Department Assembly, Senator, and principal of the Colegio Central of the University of Antioquia.
