= Foundation for Press Freedom =

Logo of the Foundation for Press Freedom

The Foundation for Press Freedom or "FLIP" (Spanish: La Fundación para la Libertad de Prensa; abbreviated "FLIP") is a non-profit organization originally created to protect threatened journalists in Colombia. Currently, FLIP also follows and denounces violations to freedom of press in Colombia and defends and promotes freedom of expression and the right to access public information.

Journalist Ignacio Gómez co-founded the organization in 1996 and served as the group's director until 2001. In 2010, the group won the Missouri Honor Medal for Distinguished Service in Journalism, awarded by the Missouri School of Journalism.
