= Posada Alemana =

Estate owned by a former Colombian drug lord

Posada Alemana (Spanish for "German Inn") was a hotel complex built by Colombian former drug lord Carlos Lehder, located between the towns of Armenia and Pereira.

was a hotel complex built and owned by Colombian former drug lord Carlos Lehder, located on the road that connects the cities of Armenia, to the north 175 km (109 mi), and Pereira 284 km^{2} (110 sq mi), and close to the road that goes to the town of Salento 88 km^{2} (34 sq mi), Quindío Department, Colombia. And 296.5 km (184.2 mi) west of Bogotá. The estate covers about 64.137 km^{2} (24.763 sq mi) of land. Following Lehder's capture in 1987, the Inn was subject to looting, abandonment and expropriation by the Colombian government. Today it is an ecological park owned by the government of the department of Qundío.

== History ==
=== Background ===
After his return to Colombia, Carlos Lehder, a native of Armenia, had returned to Colombia from Norman's Cay, acting as an investor businessman who was bringing development and well-being to the department of Quindío. The Inn was built built on an old Cyclo-cross track in 1981 and opened in 1982 in honor of his father's eponymous property that had been closed by the government of president Eduardo Santos as one of its measures against the Rome-Berlin-Tokyo Axis and its migrants in Colombia in World War II.

=== Rise ===
The hotel staff was trained by SENA, which sent instructors to the regional headquarters of the department, although they did not always work at the inn as they tended to steal various items. Lehder used to hold parties where he hired film crews.

The Inn had several Swiss-style cabins, a wine bar, a cage with Andean condors, another cage with tigers and another with llamas, although the Posada owed its popularity to a real-size statue of John Lennon commissioned by Lehder from the famous Colombian sculptor Rodrigo Arenas Betancourt, one of the firsts made after his murder, the first of its kind in Latin America, and with this statue in the Inn a nightclub was built with photos of Lennon showing his biography and with wines and an apple at the entrance (alluding to the logo of Apple Corps). The statue was controversial at the time because Lennon was depicted naked in a German worker's helmet (alluding to the song Working Class Hero), with his guitar; his Rickenbacker 325 used in the early years of The Beatles, with two holes representing shots fired by Mark David Chapman in Lennon's murder, his left hand had the word PEACE (PAZ) and it's genitals the word LOVE (AMOR). Lehder and some friends also used to put candles on the sculpture when they sent their drug shipments.

At the Posada, Lehder also launched his National Latin Movement, a political movement with which Lehder intended to pursue his political career.

=== Downfall and fate ===
The inn was partially abandoned when Lehder went into hiding following the persecution of the minister of justice Rodrigo Lara Bonilla against drug trafficking, and his subsequent murder. In 1985 the inn was victim of a fire that destroyed the restaurant and part of the bar.

Following Lehder's capture and extradition in 1987, the inn was the target of looting by people looking for hidden money or valuables. Years later, in 1998, the inn, after having been abandoned and in ruins for several years, was expropriated by the Colombian government. Betancourt. In 2020, the government of the department of Quindío announced the creation of an ecological theme park after the property became its property.

Until 2025 it was believed that the sculpture was stolen at the end of 2003, or in the hands of María Elena Quintero, Arenas' widow, but it had been seized by the Quindío government to prevent its theft and dismantling, and through Lehder's efforts the sculpture was returned to its original location amid divided opinions.
