= Jaime Ramírez (police officer) =

Colombian police officer (1940–1986)

Jaime Ramírez Gómez
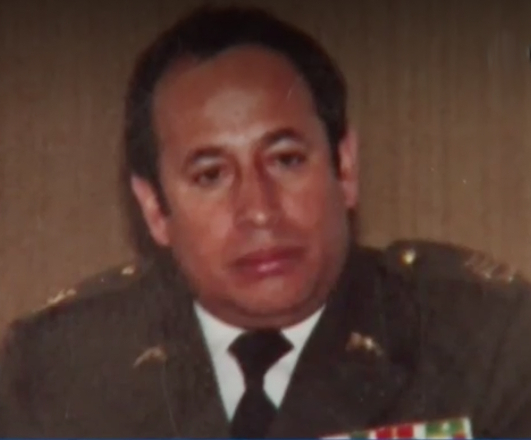

Brigadier General

Personal details
- Born: 4 July 1940 Chía, Cundinamarca Department, Colombia
- Died: 17 November 1986 (aged 46) Fontibón, Bogota, Colombia

Jaime Ramírez Gómez (4 July 1940 – 17 November 1986) was an official of the National Police of Colombia, who led a fight against the illegal drug trade in Colombia from the 1970s onwards.

He became the national director of the Colombian drug enforcement unit, working with the Minister of Justice Rodrigo Lara Bonilla against the Medellín Cartel. The biggest blow against the cartel was dealt by Colonel Ramírez (later Brigadier General) on 7 March 1984, in an operation involving the DEA to locate and destroy a large cocaine production camp in the jungle of the Yari River (between the departments of Caqueta and Meta) known by the cartel as "Tranquilandia" (the "Tranquil Land"). It triggered direct hostilities by the cartel against the Colombian state, commencing with the murders of Minister Lara Bonilla on 30 April 1984, and Colonel Jaime Ramírez Gómez two years later.

The importance of Ramírez's fight against the drug traffickers has been highlighted years after his murder, due to the damage caused by drug cartels to both Colombian and international communities. On 10 August 1992, almost six years after the murder of Ramírez, the President of Colombia decreed that he should receive a posthumous promotion to Brigadier General, a position that was due to be given to him one month after his murder.

== Carvalho and the Queen of Cocaine ==
Colonel Ramírez's fight started in the 1970s when he led the dismantling of a gang of counterfeiters and drug traffickers in Bogotá, who were led by a Brazilian man known as Iván Darío Carvalho, alias "El Mocho", allegedly born in Medellín. The Police arrested him in April 1975 and found cocaine valued at 150 million Colombian pesos along with equipment for the counterfeiting of passports and visas at his residence. This operation led to a police incursion into a property of El Mocho in the municipality of Tena, Cundinamarca, where they found connections with Verónica Rivera de Vargas, alias the Queen of Cocaina.

== Chief of the Colombian Drug Enforcement Unit ==
Colonel Ramírez's successes against drug cartels brought him to the position of Director of the Colombian Drug Enforcement Unit at the same moment that the political leader Rodrigo Lara Bonilla, a bitter enemy of drug cartels and corruption, was promoted to the position of Minister of Justice by the Presidency of Belisario Betancourt Cuartas (1982–1986). Ramírez and Lara assembled a team to search for connections with drug traffickers and enlisted thirty people, many of them participating in politics, and discovered that the cartels were using several aircraft and legal airports to export illegal drugs to United States and Europe. With that information, Minister Lara ordered the suspension of any flight that was seen as suspicious, dealing a heavy blow to the cartels' operations, as well as denouncing dirty money in different political parties and even in sport teams.

The enforcement actions of Minister Lara against ringleaders such as Pablo Escobar Gaviria, Carlos Lehder, Gonzalo Rodríguez Gacha, the Ochoa brothers (Fabio, Jorge and Juan David Ochoa), all known as the Medellín Cartel, made him a target for assassination. Security protection for Minister Lara was strict under Colonel Ramírez and the DEA, who frustrated a first attempt at murder in Medellín which led to the arrest of American Joseph Harold Rosenthal, alias Edward John Burn, involved in money laundering associated to narcotics.

The next big blow to the Medellín Cartel and probably the biggest one, was also led by Colonel Ramírez and the DEA, with the agreement of Minister Lara. It was the destruction of a huge camp for the production of cocaine hidden in the jungles of the Yarí River, between the departments of Caquetá and Meta. The place was named "Tranquilandia" (Tranquil Land) by the cartel. The Police seized 1,500 kilograms of cocaine (13.8 tons) and arrested 40 people in what was called the "Yarí '84" Operation on 7 March 1984. The camp had nine cocaine laboratories, eight landing strips, health centers, communications and basic services such as water and electricity.

With the destruction of Tranquilandia, the cartel declared war on the Colombian State, starting with the murder of Minister Lara on 30 April 1984, seven weeks after the seizure of the cocaine production camp.

== Death ==
The death of Minister Lara brought terrible consequences for both Colombia and for the cartel leaders who as a result became a target of international persecution. Colombia was deeply divided between those who accepted the drug cartel's corruption and those who joined to fight against it, many times without the support of the State. Although the Medellín Cartel was damaged, it was powerful and began a chain of murders against political leaders, judges, police, journalists and anyone who dared to stand against it.

Colonel Ramírez's name was put in the hit list of the cartel and it did not rest until it was able to break through his security to avenge the damage he did to its criminal network. On 17 November 1986, When he was returning to Bogotá with his family in a white Toyota Land Cruiser, two hitmen driving a green Renault 18 (since it was a Sunday only one vehicle of bodyguards was beside them the hitmen), and used a RPG-7 to subdue the bodyguards. They then wounded him and he subsequently crashed into a rock near a police station. Colonel Ramírez walked out of his SUV and the assailants repeatedly shot him with an automatic weapon. Colonel Ramírez was killed almost instantly. His family remained unharmed. One month later, on the same day, chief editor of El Espectador Guillermo Cano Isaza was also assassinated.

The assassination of Colonel Ramírez was just one act in a macabre war by the Medellín Cartel against the Colombian State in its attempt to outsmart it. But it was also a milestone which resulted in the fight against the cartel being quickly strengthened with the international support of the DEA in order to hunt down the main ringleaders. On 18 August 1989, a successor of Ramírez, Colonel Waldemar Franklin Quintero, was also murdered by the same cartel, but four months later, on 15 December 1989, justice received its first meaningful victory in that war with the death of Gonzalo Rodríguez Gacha, alias The Mexican. The next success was when Pablo Escobar Gaviria, alias El Patrón, surrendered himself to the authorities in 1991, however he made sure that the Colombian government would agree to a non-extradition regulation so that he could not be extradited to the United States. Afterwards, he escaped and tried to create his own war against the State, but he was shot down by the Police Special Force on 2 December 1993.

== Legacy ==
Although Colonel Ramírez was not properly recognized while alive for facing almost alone the power of the drug cartels, his importance has been acknowledged years after his death, thanks to historical accounts from different sources, including his own former enemies such as John Jairo Velásquez, alias Popeye, lieutenant of Pablo Escobar, who published a book, "Surviving Pablo Escobar" (2015), where he described the crimes of the Medellín Cartel.

=== Honorable mentions ===
Colonel Ramírez was murdered one month before what would have been his promotion to brigadier general. After his death, the Direction of the Colombian Police suspended a posthumous promotion allegedly because "he died outside a police operation". After a legal battle of seven years, the presidency of César Gaviria Trujillo ordered his posthumous promotion to brigadier general.

=== Representations in Television ===
- In the series of Caracol Television, Pablo Escobar, The Drug Lord (2012) by Carlos Moreno, portraying the life of the drug lord, Colonel Ramírez is called "Colonel Jairo Jiménez" by actor Julio Pachón.
- In the series of Fox Telecolombia, Alias El Mexicano (2013) by Diego Mejía and Monica Botero, Colonel Ramírez keeps his same real name and he is performed by actor Rafael Novoa. In this series, Colonel Ramírez is one of the protagonists at the side of Minister Lara and some fictional characters who represent the fight of many people that faced the drug traffickers despite the fear of losing their lives.
- In the web television series, Narcos (2015) by Chris Brancato, Carlo Bernard, and Doug Miro, a fictional character named Horacio Carrillo is based on Colonel Ramírez. He is portrayed by Maurice Compte.
