= Jack Carlton Reed =

Jack Carlton Reed (September 30, 1930 – October 12, 2009) was a drug smuggler and co-defendant of the Colombian drug baron and Medellín Cartel co-founder Carlos Enrique Lehder Rivas. Reed was a pilot working under Lehder’s cocaine transport empire on Norman's Cay, an out island 210 miles (340 km) off the Florida coast, in the Exuma chain in the Bahamas. Reed flew drug runs for Lehder, who handled transport and distribution, while Colombian drug lord Pablo Escobar handled production and supply.

From 1978 through 1982, Norman’s Cay was the center of the world’s largest drug smuggling operation and a tropical hideaway for Lehder and associates, including Reed. Cocaine was flown in from Colombia by private aircraft, then reloaded into other aircraft that then distributed it to locations in Georgia, Florida, and the Carolinas. It was flown into the United States via the Bahamas, a path made possible via Colombian suppliers and bribes allegedly spread among Bahamian government officials for political and judicial protection On Norman’s Cay, Lehder maintained a 3,100-foot (1,000 m) runway protected by radar, bodyguards, and guard dogs for the fleet of aircraft under his command.

Lehder and Reed, who held separate residences on the island, eventually fled Norman’s Cay after authorities threatened to shut down the illicit billion-dollar drug smuggling operation for good.

In February 1987, days after Lehder was captured in the Colombian jungle, Reed was apprehended in Panama. The co-defendants were charged with conspiring to smuggle 3.3 tons of cocaine into the United States from Colombia from 1978 to 1980.

Reed was convicted of conspiracy to distribute cocaine and operating a continuing criminal enterprise. Prosecutors said Reed was an important player in the Lehder organization, flying drug shipments from Colombia, hiring ground crews, and working with distributors.

Lehder lost his fight against extradition (by which point his net worth was approximately $2.5 billion). He is incarcerated for life in the United States, under WITSEC, the Bureau of Prisons’ version of the Federal Witness Protection Program.

Reed was sentenced to two consecutive life terms and fined $2 million. He was incarcerated at the Federal Correctional Institute in Memphis, Tennessee and later moved to a Federal Medical Center. After spending nearly 23 years behind bars, his two daughters contacted the courts on their father's behalf to petition for his release. According to them, it was God who saw that Reed was granted a Clemency Release with his sentence reduced to time served. He died after his release.
