= Tranquilandia =

Colombian cocaine processing laboratory

Coordinates: 1.3158°N 74.8609°W

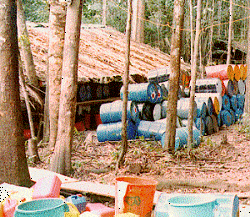
- View of the tanks of ether at Tranquilandia, 1984

General information
- Location: Caquetá and Meta
- Owner: Medellín Cartel

Tranquilandia was a large cocaine-processing complex operated by the Medellín Cartel in the Llanos del Yarí region of southern Colombia, spanning areas of the Caquetá and Meta near the Japurá River. Discovered and destroyed by the National Police of Colombia with support from the U.S. DEA in March 1984, the site became one of the first public demonstrations of the industrial scale of the Medellín network's cocaine production.

== Establishment and operations (early 1980s) ==
Tranquilandia was developed in the early 1980s as part of the Medellín network's expansion into self-contained jungle laboratories, an innovation attributed to José Gonzalo Rodríguez Gacha, who managed logistics in Colombia's southern departments. Under the law of "Money or bullets", Rodríguez and their Cartel partners bought and/or intimidated the peasant inhabitants of the area, whose airstrips were authorized by the Colombian Civil Aviation Authority. Colombian police records and later investigative reporting describe a vast complex of nineteen laboratories, housing for hundreds of workers, electric generators, medical posts, and between six and eight airstrips capable of receiving medium cargo aircraft. Located roughly 400 km south of Bogotá, it was accessible primarily by air and river routes through the Yarí basin.

Estimates of the complex's production capacity range from 8 to 14 metric tons of refined cocaine per month, depending on purity. Equipment seized in the raid included industrial dryers, chemical vats, acetone and ether storage, aircraft fuel depots, and communications towers linking the site to northern trafficking corridors. At its height, Tranquilandia served as a processing and consolidation hub for coca paste flown in from Peru and Bolivia, which was then refined for export to the United States and Europe.

== Discovery and police raid (March 1984) ==
The complex was located through a joint Colombian–U.S. investigation that tracked precursor chemicals used in cocaine processing. On March 5, 1984, when the leaders of the Medellín Cartel had gone underground, there was a rumor about the existence of a huge cocaine factory whose location was unknown. According to a declassified DEA briefing and the testimony of Special Agent Richard Bly, agents fitted bulk ether and acetone shipments exported from Florida with tracking devices and monitored their route through Caribbean intermediaries to southern Colombia.

Once the supply chain was mapped, coordinates were provided to Colombian authorities.

Between 7 and 10 March 1984, units of the Colombian National Police's Special Operations Command, commanded by Col. Jaime Ramírez Gómez, and General Luis Ernesto Gilibert Vargas with support from DEA aircraft and advisors, stormed the Yarí complex. Although the location was guarded by some armed men, they fled when faced with the superior numbers of the police and DEA agents. Over several days, they seized approximately 13.8 metric tons of cocaine, destroyed laboratories and fuel stores, and impounded aircraft, vehicles, and river craft. The DEA's official photographs, released after the raid, show rows of barrels, aircraft fuselages, and processing equipment across the clearings. Colombian authorities estimated the seizure's street value at over US $1.2 billion, making it the largest single narcotics seizure in Latin America to that date.

== Aftermath and impact ==
The destruction of Tranquilandia dealt a substantial financial and logistical blow to the Medellín network and exposed the industrial organization of cocaine production to the international press for the first time. At the same time, Pablo Escobar's criminal past was exposed by the newspaper El Espectador, resulting in the cancellation of his US visa, his expulsion from Congress, his mandatory retirement from politics, and an arrest warrant issued by Judge Gustavo Zuluaga. Within six weeks, however, the government's success provoked violent retaliation: on 30 April 1984, Justice Minister Rodrigo Lara Bonilla, who had publicly condemned Pablo Escobar and supported extradition of traffickers to the United States, was assassinated by Medellín gunmen.

Declassified U.S. and Colombian analyses regard Tranquilandia as a turning point: it disrupted a centralized production hub but accelerated the cartel's shift to smaller, dispersed laboratories and to greater investment in political violence and corruption as defensive strategies. Analysts from Colombia's Comisión de la Verdad note that although the raid represented a major tactical success, it also intensified the conflict that would define Colombia's drug war throughout the late 1980s. The Cessna HK 3064, HK 3007 -registered in Colombia- N 3271 and YV 1085 P- aircraft registered abroad and a Hughes 500 helicopter with registration HK-2704, belonging to Aerofotos Amórtegui Ltda., an aerial photography business of which Alberto Uribe Sierra was a partner, father of the future president Álvaro Uribe, elected in 2002, were immobilized.

== See also ==
- Medellín Cartel
- Illegal drug trade in Colombia
