= Gilberto Molina =

Major Colombian emerald magnate

Gilberto Molina Moreno (February 27, 1937 – February 27, 1989) was a major Colombian emerald magnate who was intimately connected to the notorious Medellín cartel and widely suspected of involvement in drug trafficking during the 1980s.

Molina was born in Tudela, in the town of Paime, Cundinamarca. He spent his youth in the emerald mining zone in the cities of Muzo and Quipama in the department of Boyacá, centered about 120 km northwest of Bogotá, where he farmed cattle and worked as a butcher. Colombia's emerald mines are considered some of the richest in the world. He soon became involved with the emerald business as members of his family were members of a militia in charge of keeping the mines safe, called "La Pesada." He worked first searching for emeralds and then as guard, and he started making a name for himself, often being called the "emerald tsar". It was then that Molina met a young Gonzalo Rodríguez Gacha, "El Mexicano," who would become years later one of the most feared kingpins in the infamous Medellín Cartel. Rodríguez Gacha had moved to the area to look for a better life and he soon became part of Molina's group, as a hitman, and then as his head of security. It was also around his time that he associated with Víctor Carranza with whom he discovered a large mine, and with whom he became the main beneficiary of the mine concessions by the government, which allowed both him and Carranza to legalize their immense riches and consolidate their power.

Once he became rich, Molina became a celebrity in Quipama, a town that he revitalized by building a number of public facilities and constructions, including among others a town hall, schools, a market place and an airport, estimated around $500,000. With his partner Carranza, he became involved in the so-called "Green Wars," armed conflicts among families over the control of the mines.

At some point, and probably as a result of his connections with Rodríguez Gacha, Molina apparently also became involved with drug trafficking and with the sponsorship of paramilitary right-wing organizations. Due to this sponsorship, Molina had been declared a military objective by the FARC guerrilla. During January 1988, Molina was charged with allegations that he operated an airplane maintenance facility at Subachoque, near Bogotá, where helicopters (including Panamanian registered helicopters) were serviced secretly. He also owned a private ranch called La Fortuna, which allegedly contained sophisticated warning devices and was used as a drug distribution center. In January 1988, Molina was arrested on a murder charge and was later implicated as the owner of a 200-hectare coca plantation in Boyacá. However, the narcotics charges were later dropped.

Between 1987 and 1989, he was involved in a new Green War, an intense power struggle over the control the emerald mines. Specifically, Molina was battling a rival operation, the Coscuez mines, in the violence-ridden emerald-mining district. Molina was initially assumed to be victorious in this violent struggle, along with his business partners Morita and Victor Carranza. Many attempts were made on his life in 1988, which involved even rockets and grenades. Finally, on Monday, February 27, 1989, a group consisting of around 25 uniformed men stormed into Molina's luxurious ranch, located in Sasaima, 72 km west of Bogotá, while Molina was hosting a housewarming party. The attackers took over the ranch without a fight and killed 18 men, including Molina, another emerald dealer, a retired police colonel in charge of Molina's security, several bodyguards, friends and musicians.

Despite the widespread suspicion of involvement in cocaine trafficking, Molina was also regarded as a public benefactor, and his rich and luxurious funeral was attended by many. In contrast, his death was celebrated by many in the regions controlled by his rivals, as he was accused of many of the hundreds of fatalities that occurred in the course of the many Green wars. Although Colombian police officials first speculated that the slaughter could have been on the orders of Luis Murcia, a.k.a. "el Pequinés", a rival emerald kingpin, the consensus is that the responsible was his former friend and partner Rodríguez Gacha, who apparently felt that Molina had betrayed him by blaming him of being the actual owner of the coca plantation that got him arrested. Furthermore, Rodríguez Gacha wanted to get hold of the emerald business and had made a failed attempt to elbow Molina and Carranza out of the emerald profession.

== In popular culture ==
- He is portrayed by the Colombian actor Alfonso Ortiz in the TV series Alias El Mexicano.
