= Operation Karina =

Colombian weapons smuggling operation

Operation Karina was a large-scale weapons smuggling operation carried out by Colombia's 19th of April Movement between June and November 1981.

In late June 1981, a team of M-19 operatives that included Jaime Guillot Lara, arrived in Hamburg, Germany, under orders from M-19 commander Jaime Bateman to purchase a cargo ship capable of carrying 40 tons of cargo across the Atlantic all the way to Colombia. The team purchased an old cargo ship named the 'Roland Crussy', and sailed to Libya.

In Libya, the ship was loaded with 1,000 Belgian FN FAL combat rifles, and one million rounds of 7.62×51mm ammunition. The ship then sailed to the Canary Islands, where it was painted and re-christened 'El Karina'. Fully fueled, the Karina sails to Panama, where half the load is transferred to a stolen cargo ship named 'El Zar'.

The weapons on the Zar are sailed to Colombia's La Guajira Department, and hidden near a clandestine landing strip outside the beach town of Dibulla. Meanwhile, the Karina, still holding half the weapons, crosses the Panama Canal and tries to disembark its load along Colombia's Pacific coastal region of Chocó, but is intercepted by the Colombian Navy ship ARC Sebastián de Belalcázar, and sunk. Three M-19 crew-members survived: Fernando Erazo, Héctor Gonzales, and Jairo Rubio.

In order to move the weapons that were stashed near Dibulla, another M-19 commando hijacks a Curtiss C-46 cargo plane belonging to the charter company Aeropesca. They land the plane in the clandestine airfield where the weapons are stored, load them onto the plane with the help of local marijuana smugglers, and fly south towards the M-19's jungle stronghold in the Caquetá Department.

Unable to find a suitable landing strip, the M-19 force the cargo plane's pilot to land in the Orteguaza River. The weapons were then ferried through the jungle using dugout canoes.
