= Johnny Crump =

Columbian lawyer and smuggler

- Born: Juan Lorenzo Crump Perez
- Occupations: Lawyer and drug & arms smuggler
- Known for: Provided testimony that implicated the Cuban government in large-scale international narco-trafficking

Details
- Locations: Colombia, Florida, Cuba
- Date apprehended: January 1982

Juan Lorenzo Crump Perez, also known as Johnny Crump, is a Colombian lawyer and drug and arms smuggler who provided testimony that implicated the Cuban government in large-scale international narco-trafficking in 1982.

== Smuggling Career and "The Cuban Connection" ==
In the mid-70's Crump, whose grandfather had left Macon, Georgia, to build a business in South America, decided he could make a lot more money smuggling drugs than he could ever make legally in Barranquilla. By 1980, Crump was smuggling thousands of pounds of marijuana, and millions of methaqualone tablets from Colombia to Florida, through Cuba. In 1981, Crump introduced fellow smuggler Jaime Guillot Lara to Gonzalo Bezol, a Cuban diplomat. According to the DEA, Bezol and Guillot then traveled to Nicaragua and met with Raúl Castro. Soon after, ships owned by Guillot moving marijuana and weapons through Cuban territory.

Crump was arrested in January 1982 at the Omni International Hotel in Miami on charges of importing marijuana and cocaine into the United States. Facing 60 years in prison Crump collaborated with authorities and testified against several high-ranking Cuban government officials, and Colombian smugglers. In April 1982 Crump was given a 25-year suspended sentence with a six-year probation.

== Witness Protection ==
After cooperating with authorities to indict several Cuban government officials, Crump began living under an assumed name at an undisclosed location as part of the Federal Witness Protection Program.
