= Jaime Guillot Lara =

Jaime Guillot Lara (1949 - April 1991) was a Colombian drug and weapons smuggler, and international underworld facilitator, indicted for his involvement in the trafficking of 2.5 million pounds of marijuana, 25 million methaqualone tablets, and 80 pounds of cocaine to the United States between 1977 and 1981.

== Smuggling career ==
The DEA started watching Guillot Lara in 1975, and estimated that by the late 70's he was delivering in excess of 400,000 pounds of marijuana into U.S. markets each year. During this time, he acquired partial or outright ownership of nearly a half-dozen motherships. In 1981, Guillot Lara met Cuban ambassador to Colombia Fernando Ravelo-Renedo, and agreed to pay 200,000 for each 10-ton marijuana shipment, in exchange for transit protection through Cuban waters. The tax was less than that levied on other traffickers, because Guillot Lara supported the budding M-19 guerrilla movement in Colombia. At the height of his wealth, he owned a housing development of 200 homes in Barranquilla, and a $300,000 house in South Miami.

== Connection with Colombia's M-19 ==
In 1981, Guillot Lara provided financial and logistics support to Colombia's M-19 guerrillas during the execution of Operation Karina. He facilitated the purchase of a cargo ship in Germany, and 1,000 FN FAL rifles in Libya, and their transfer to Colombian waters and then across the Panama Canal. One of his marijuana smuggling vessels, El Monarca, was used to transfer part of the weapons to a clandestine airfield in Colombia's Guajira region. The weapons were then transported to the M-19's jungle in southern Colombia on board of a hijacked Curtiss C-46 owned by private carrier Aeropesca. Guillot Lara made his smuggling infrastructure and manpower available to the M-19 during the operation, as well as long distance radio communication.

== Kidnapping ==
In early 1981 Guillot was kidnapped in Miami by other drug dealers. He survived the ordeal. Metro-Dade police did not find out about it until Coral Gables police discovered his baby-blue Mercedes Benz 450SL riddled with bullets and submerged in a canal.

== The "Cuba Connection" indictment ==
On Jan. 8, 1982 Guillot Lara was indicted by a federal grand jury in Miami along with several Cuban government officials, of drug trafficking. The indictment accused the Cuban officials of allowing Cuba to be used as a loading station and source of supplies for drug smugglers operating between Colombia and the U.S. between October 1979 and January 1981. The indictment also named Cuban Vice Adm. Aldo Santamaria, and Cuban ambassador to Colombia Fernando Rovelo-Renedo. According to the DEA's account, the smuggling operation depended on Guillot Lara's fleet of mother ships, all code-named "Viviana" for recognition by the Cuban navy. A week later, his Miami associate in drugs and arms, Johnny Crump, was also indicted on smuggling charges. In April 1982 Crump was given a 25-year suspended sentence with a six-year probation for cooperating with federal authorities.

== Extradition to Cuba ==
In early 1982, Guillot Lara was jailed in Mexico City on marijuana conspiracy charges, and interrogated by the CIA. The agency was said to be particularly interested in reports of Guillot's ties with the Castro government and the M-19 guerrillas. After the details of Guillot Lara's indictment came to light, Cuban DGI agents approached the Mexican government to secure his release. In late 1982, Guillot Lara had been released from a Mexican prison and was in Cuba.

== Death ==
Guillot Lara died in a Cuban prison of a heart attack in April 1991. His remains were moved 4 years later to his native city of Santa Marta, Colombia.

== See also ==
- Johnny Crump
- North Coast Cartel
