= Gustavo Gaviria =

Colombian drug trafficker (1946–1990)

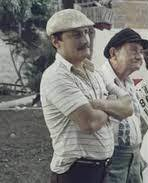
- Gaviria in 1978
- Born: Gustavo de Jesús Gaviria Rivero; 25 December 1946; Pereira, Colombia
- Died: 11 August 1990 (aged 43); Medellín, Colombia
- Other names: El León (The Lion); El Doctor (The Doctor)
- Organization: Medellín Cartel
- Relatives: Pablo Escobar Gaviria (cousin); Roberto Escobar (cousin)

Gustavo de Jesús Gaviria Rivero (25 December 1946 – 11 August 1990) was a Colombian drug trafficker. As one of Pablo Escobar's cousins and his right-hand man, Gaviria controlled the Medellín cartel's finances and trade routes. He and Escobar had collaborated in their criminal careers since the early 1970s.

Though he was the owner of a fortune comparable to Escobar's and even had a military apparatus at his service, Gaviria was not as well known, as he kept a low profile.

Gaviria was killed on August 11, 1990, by Search Bloc in the Laureles neighborhood of Medellín and the incident was covered up to prevent retaliation.

Gustavo's death deeply affected Escobar, given their deep personal and professional relationship. Nonetheless, Escobar did not attend his cousin's funeral but instead listened to the funeral mass via a radio his assistant had attached to the officiating priest.

After Gustavo's death, Escobar decided to turn himself in but to stay at La Catedral, a jail of his own making, guarded by his own guards. Since Gustavo died four days after President César Gaviria took office, at the time, the media and the country in general thought the president had begun his term with an offensive against the narcoterrorists. Gustavo's death triggered a counter-offensive by Escobar that initially destabilized the new president's administration.

== In popular culture ==
- Gustavo was played by actor Juan Pablo Raba in the first season of the Netflix television series, Narcos. The series attributes his death to the former members of the Search Bloc as well as relatives of Escobar's victims, but depicts it happening some time into the Gaviria administration.
- Actor Christian Tappan plays "Gonzalo Gaviria", a character inspired by Gustavo Gaviria, in the 2012 television series Pablo Escobar, The Drug Lord.
- In TV Series Tres Caínes is portrayed by the Colombian actor Julio Pachón
- In TV Series En la boca del lobo is portrayed by Simón Rivera as the character of Pariente Gavirno.
