= Muerte a Secuestradores =

Colombian paramilitary group

Death to Kidnappers
- Muerte a Secuestradores
- Active: 1981–1990s
- Country: Colombia
- Role: Narcoterrorism; Vigilantism
- Size: 2,300
- Engagements: Colombian conflict

Commanders
- Notable commanders: Pablo Escobar; Jorge Luis Ochoa Vásquez; José Gonzalo Rodríguez Gacha

Insignia
- Identification symbol: Initials MAS

Muerte a Secuestradores (English: Death to Kidnappers) or MAS, was a Colombian paramilitary group and a private army supported by drug cartels, U.S. corporations, Colombian politicians, and wealthy landowners during the 1980s to protect their economic interests and fight kidnapping. Muerte a Secuestradores assassinated political opponents and community organizers, and waged counterinsurgency warfare against guerrilla movements such as the FARC-EP and the M-19.

== History ==
Many of the drug barons began purchasing enormous quantities of land, in order to launder their drug money, and to gain social status amongst the traditional Colombian elite. By the late 1980s, the new class of drug traffickers were the largest landholders in Colombia. They used much of this land for grazing cattle, or left it completely idle as a show of wealth. They also raised private armies to fight off guerrillas who were trying to either redistribute their lands to local peasants, kidnap them, or extract the gramaje tax that was commonly levied on landed elites. At that time, many communist insurgents found a way to profit from these by kidnapping family members of these drug barons, the most famous of which was the kidnapping of Martha Nieves Ochoa Vasquez, the sister of the Ochoa brothers, in 1981. The drug barons, specifically the Medellin cartel, fought back, using their tactics of assassinations against rival gangs to the insurgents.

=== ACDEGAM ===
At the end of 1981 and the beginning of 1982, members of the Medellín Cartel, the Colombian military, the U.S.-based corporation Texas Petroleum, the Colombian legislature, small industrialists, and wealthy cattle ranchers came together in a series of meetings in Puerto Boyacá, and formed a paramilitary organization known as Muerte a Secuestradores ("Death to Kidnappers", MAS) to defend their economic interests, to fight against the guerrillas, and to provide protection for local elites from kidnappings and extortion. By 1983, Colombian internal affairs had registered 240 political killings by MAS death squads, mostly community leaders, elected officials, and farmers.

The following year, the Asociación Campesina de Ganaderos y Agricultores del Magdalena Medio ("Association of Middle Magdalena Ranchers and Farmers", ACDEGAM) was created to handle both the logistics and the public relations of the organization, and to provide a legal front for various paramilitary groups. ACDEGAM worked to promote anti-labor policies, and threatened anyone involved with organizing for labor or peasants' rights. The threats were backed up by the MAS, which would come in and attack or assassinate anyone who was suspected of being a "subversive". ACDEGAM also built schools whose stated purpose was the creation of a "patriotic and anti-Communist" educational environment, and built roads, bridges, and health clinics. Paramilitary recruiting, weapons storage, communications, propaganda, and medical services were all run out of ACDEGAM headquarters.

By the mid-1980s ACDEGAM and MAS had experienced significant growth. In 1985, the powerful drug traffickers Pablo Escobar, Jorge Luis Ochoa, and Gonzalo Rodríguez Gacha began funneling large amounts of cash into the organization to pay for weaponry, equipment and training. Money for social projects was cut off, and was put towards strengthening the MAS. Modern battle rifles such as the IMI Galil, HK G3, FN FAL, and AKM were purchased from the military and INUNDIL and through drug-funded private sales. The organization had computers and ran a communications center that worked in coordination with the state telecommunications office. They had thirty pilots, and an assortment of helicopters and fixed-wing aircraft. U.S., Israeli, British and Australian military instructors were hired to teach at paramilitary training centers.

=== MORENA ===
By the end of the 1980s, the MAS had a significant presence in 8 of Colombia's 32 departments—Antioquia, Boyacá, Caquetá, Córdoba, Cundinamarca, Meta, Putumayo, and Santander. During this period, a stated goal of the groups was to kill members of the Patriotic Union or any political groups that opposed drug trafficking. At the same time, they began to more intensively involve themselves in municipal, regional, and national politics. In August 1989, the Movimiento de Restauración Nacional ("Movement of National Restoration", MORENA) was formed by members of ACDEGAM.

== Misattributed violence ==
A Colombian government investigation found that by 1983, 59 murders previously attributed to MAS had been carried out by police and military officers.

== See also ==
- Right-wing paramilitarism in Colombia
