= Medellín Cartel =

Former Colombian drug cartel

- Los Extraditables
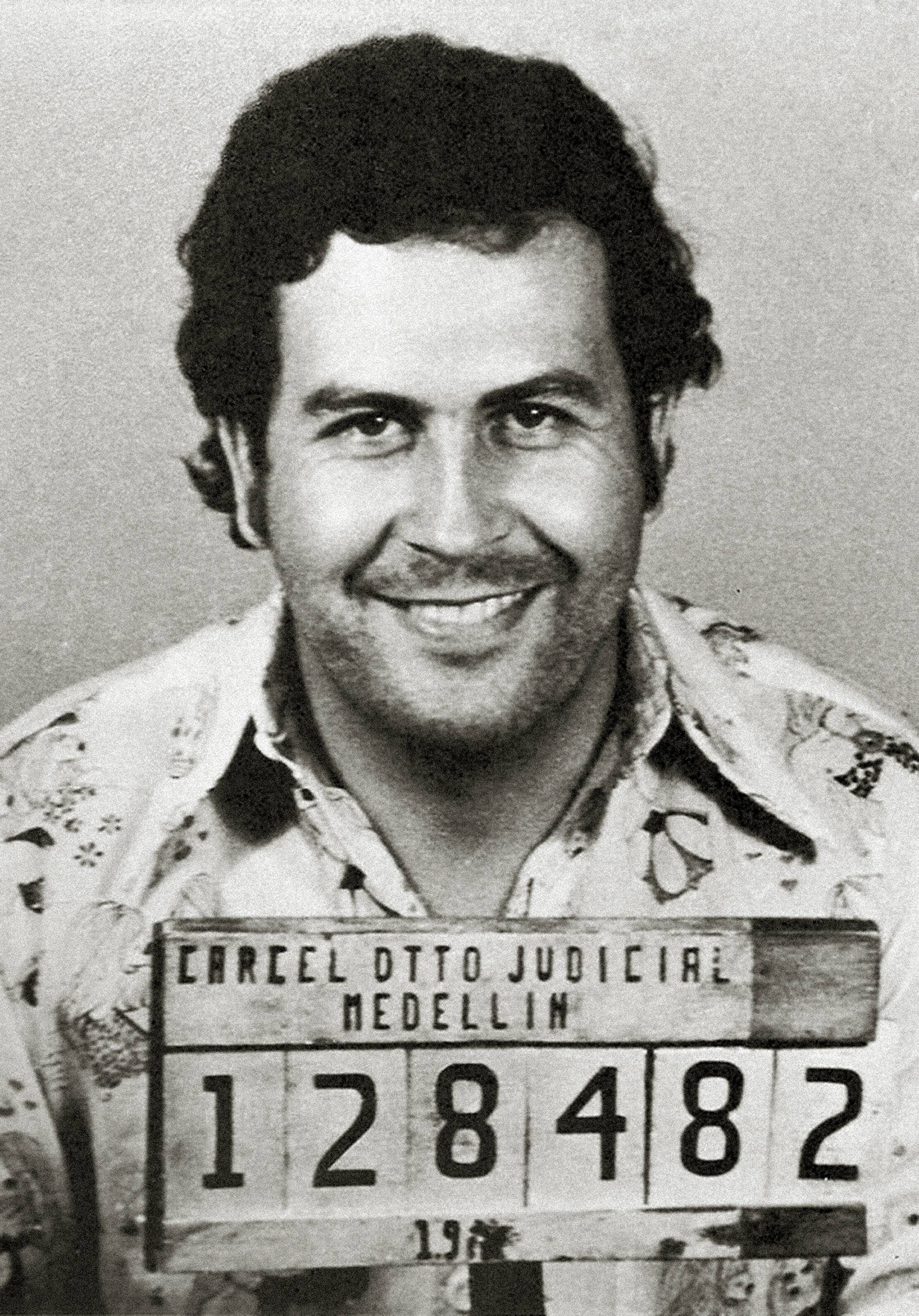
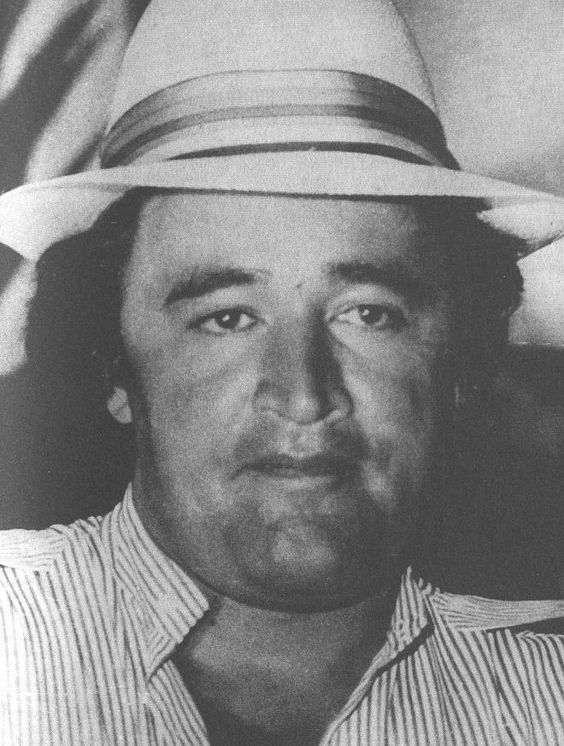
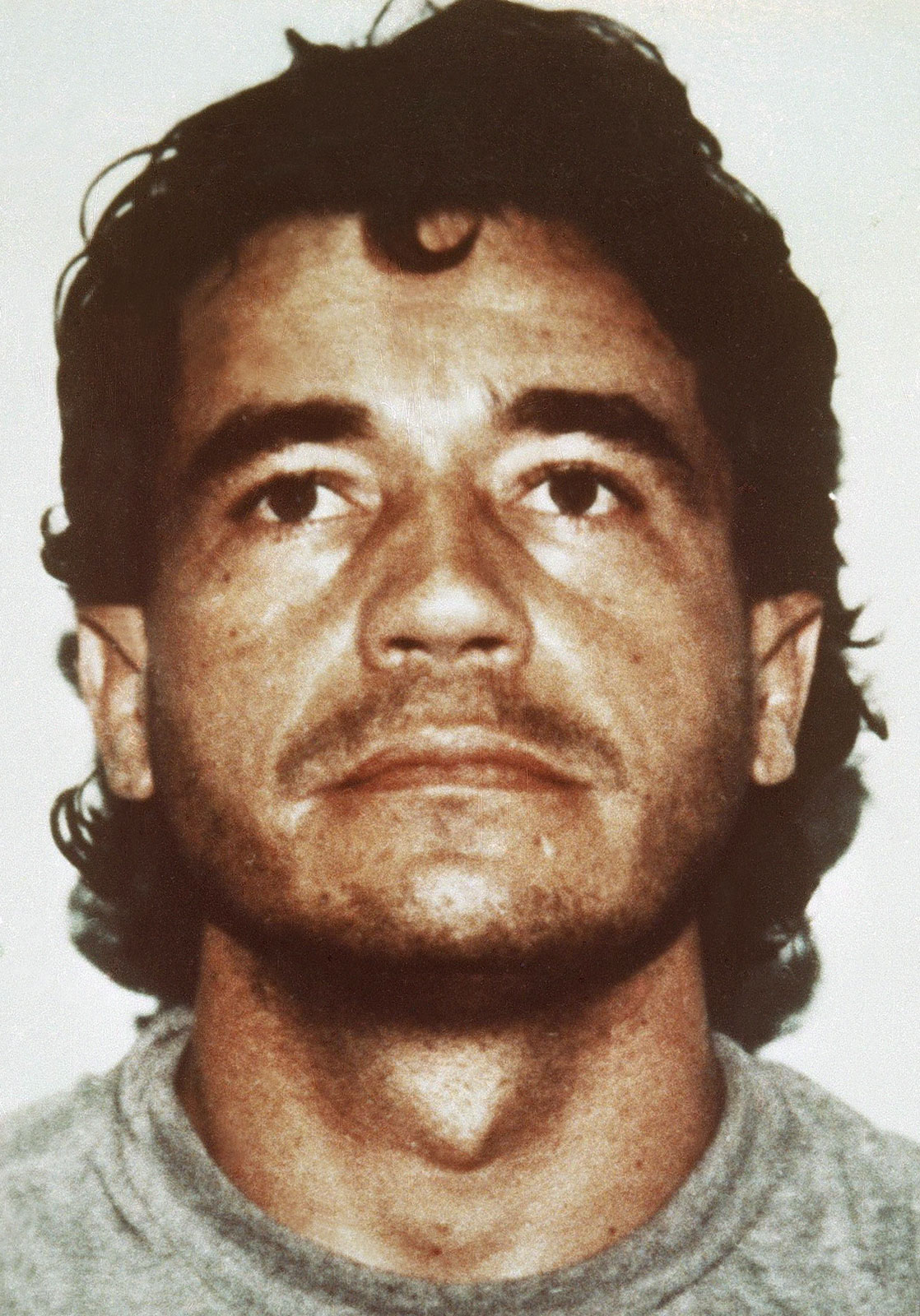
- Pablo Escobar José Rodríguez Gacha Carlos Lehder
- Founded by: Pablo Escobar; Jorge Ochoa Vásquez; Juan Ochoa Vásquez; José Rodríguez Gacha; Carlos Lehder
- Founding location: Medellín, Antioquia Department, Colombia
- Years active: 1976–1993
- Territory: Colombia (Antioquia), Panama, California, New York City, Florida, Norman's Cay
- Membership: 70,000–100,000 (750,000 total employees)
- Leaders: Pablo Escobar; Gustavo Gaviria
- Criminal activities: Drug trafficking, arms trafficking, terrorism, narcoterrorism, assassinations, intimidation, kidnapping, extortion, money laundering
- Allies: Muerte a Secuestradores (defunct); Guadalajara Cartel (defunct); The Extraditables (defunct); La Corporación (defunct); Oficina de Envigado; Los Priscos (defunct); Gallón Gang (defunct); Galician clans Gulf Cartel; Nicaragua (alleged); Cuba (alleged); Panama (alleged, under Manuel Noriega)
- Rivals: Cali Cartel (defunct); Los Pepes (defunct)

The Medellín Cartel (Spanish: Cártel de Medellín) was a confederation of Colombian drug trafficking organizations based primarily in Medellín, Colombia, that played a central role in the expansion of the international cocaine trade during the late 1970s and 1980s. Rather than a single hierarchical organization, contemporary law-enforcement assessments and subsequent scholarship describe the cartel as a network of semi-autonomous traffickers who cooperated in production, transportation, financing, and enforcement while retaining independent control over their respective operations. The network included prominent traffickers such as Pablo Escobar, Carlos Lehder, Gonzalo Rodríguez Gacha, and the Ochoa brothers—Jorge Luis Ochoa Vásquez, Fabio Ochoa Vásquez, and Juan David Ochoa Vásquez—whose activities collectively shaped the structure and scale of Colombian cocaine trafficking during this period. Estimates by U.S. and Colombian authorities during the 1980s attributed a substantial share of cocaine entering the United States to trafficking networks associated with Medellín, though contemporaneous reports emphasized that market share fluctuated over time and could not be ascribed to a single unified organization.

The Medellín network emerged in the early 1970s from Colombia's longstanding contraband economy and expanded rapidly as cocaine replaced marijuana and other illicit goods as the dominant export commodity. Traffickers associated with Medellín capitalized on growing demand in the United States, access to coca production in Peru and Bolivia, and weak state presence in rural Colombia to develop processing laboratories, transportation corridors, and international distribution routes through the Caribbean and Central America. By the mid-1970s, this network of traffickers had established the logistical and financial foundations that would underpin the rapid expansion of Colombian cocaine trafficking in the following decade.

During the late 1970s and 1980s, trafficking organizations associated with the Medellín network played a central role in scaling the international cocaine trade, moving large volumes of the drug into North American and European markets and generating revenues measured in the billions of U.S. dollars annually. Contemporary assessments by U.S. and Colombian authorities attributed a substantial share of cocaine entering the United States to trafficking routes linked to Medellín, though estimates varied widely and reflected the decentralized nature of the trade rather than the dominance of a single unified organization. Scholars emphasize that the Medellín network's influence derived less from monopoly control than from its early success in integrating production, transport, finance, and enforcement at unprecedented scale.

In parallel with its trafficking activities, elements of the Medellín network became internationally notorious for their systematic use of violence for political ends, particularly in opposition to judicial extradition to the United States. Through assassinations, kidnappings, bombings, and intimidation campaigns directed at judges, politicians, security forces, journalists, and civilians, traffickers associated with Medellín engaged in a sustained asymmetric conflict with the Colombian state, a strategy widely described in Colombian scholarship as narcoterrorism. This confrontation intensified in the late 1980s and early 1990s amid expanded security operations, international cooperation, and internal fragmentation within the network, contributing to the deaths or arrests of key figures and the eventual dismantling of Medellín's trafficking structures by present.

The decline of the Medellín network marked a turning point in the organization of the global cocaine trade, accelerating the shift toward more decentralized trafficking structures and the growing prominence of other Colombian and Mexican organizations. While its methods and visibility shaped international perceptions of drug trafficking and political violence, scholars emphasize that Medellín's long-term significance lies in its role in transforming cocaine into a large-scale transnational commodity and in reshaping state responses to organized crime in Colombia and beyond.

== History ==
=== Background & early 1970s ===
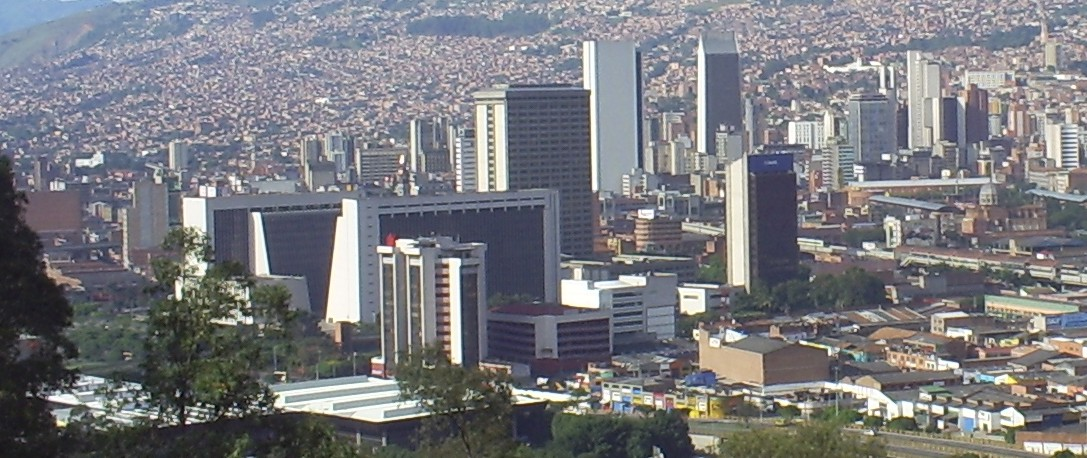
Medellín, Colombia. Headquarters of Medellín Cartel and traditional hotspot for narcotrafficking activity.

==== 1960s cocaine trade in Latin America ====
In the 1960s, Colombia was not yet viewed or stereotyped as being a conventional geophysical, narcotrafficking corridor for the world's cocaine trade like it seems to have been for marijuana trafficking at this time. By the late 1960s, Colombia's marijuana trade resulted from booming production in the Sierra Nevada de Santa Marta and the Urabá peninsula where it was then smuggled within hidden northbound shipments of bananas. Reportedly when it came to the international cocaine trade during the 60s; Argentina, Brazil and Chile were the countries with the biggest hand in the international transferring of cocaine. Rio de Janeiro (Brazil), Buenos Aires (Argentina) and Valparaíso (Chile) acted as some of the most common starting points for the 1960s maritime trafficking routes while Havana, Cuba was commonly used as an intermediary transshipment point north. Then it would go to locations like Panama City in Florida or Barcelona in Spain which both regularly functioned as final points of destination for the international transporting of cocaine or other related contraband from South America. Cartagena, in Colombia and Miami, Florida still seemed to play a modest role however. However, marijuana was still said to dominate the loads of shipments which traveled through these routes at the time. Therefore, cocaine's prevalence by then still went largely under the radar due to how in the United States, even though cocaine use was steadily rising by the 1960s, it was still only marginally - moderately more popular when compared to its relative scope of prevalence during the 1950s when the use of cocaine was considered to be at an all-time low and was essentially considered by many to mostly be "a problem of the past".

==== Colombian smugglers & Chileans (1972–1976) ====
In contrast to his law-abiding parents, Escobar began a life of crime early on; stealing tombstones from cemeteries, sanding down the headstones to make them appear unused, reselling them, stealing cars, kidnapping people for ransom; including a wealthy businessman at one point before eventually settling into the criminal occupation known as contraband smuggling which characterized a large swath and subcultural domain of Colombia's criminal underworld at this time. This is presumably around when his gang-like organizational abilities and his criminal racketeering predilections seem to have come together in what was now the early 1970s in Medellín, Colombia. Escobar took advantage of Colombia's fertile and expanding marijuana trade as well as the apparent smuggling and illegal trade of cigarettes. There are several claims that he was allegedly a noteworthy figure in the region's supposed "Marlboro wars"; a seemingly violent set of scrimmages or conflicts over the control of Colombia's illicit cigarette smuggling market. This implies that he was priming his sensibilities in street crime and violent black market schemes in what would come out in a much more organized and violent fashion not far down the line.

In 1973, there was a military coup in Chile which led to a strong crackdown on Chilean drug traffickers. This caused some drug traffickers to either flee the country and/or immediately start to use different trafficking routes. This frequently resulted in Chilean traffickers setting their eyes on Colombia to use as a trade route further north. Around the same time, the prevalence and social acceptance of contraband in Colombia was at an all-time high.

=== Late 1970s–early 1980s ===
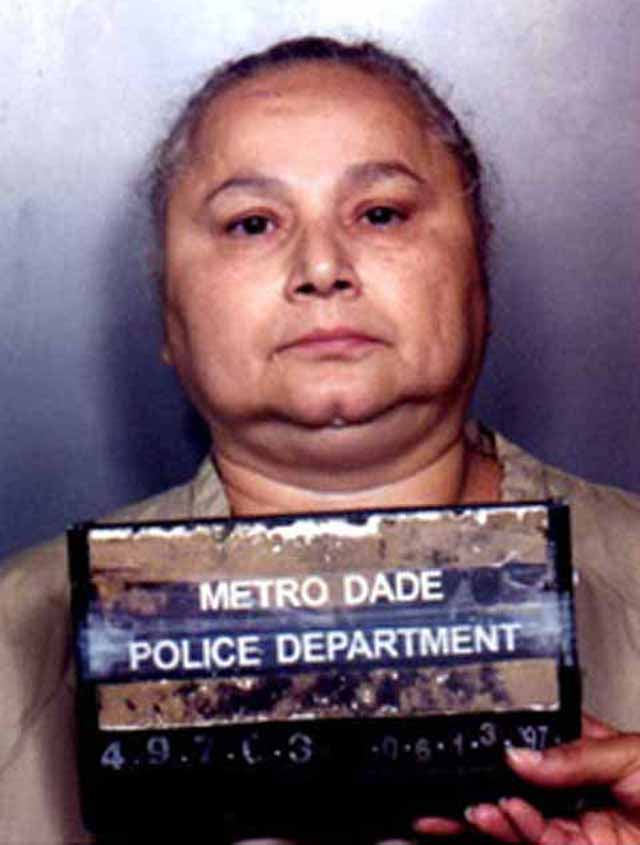
Griselda Blanco

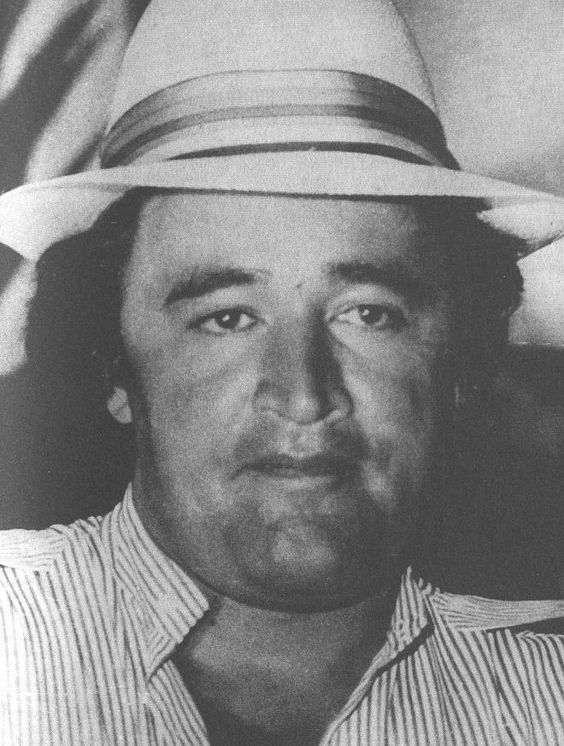
José Gonzalo Rodríguez Gacha

==== Background ====
In the mid to late 1970s, specifically around 1975 and 1976, the illegal cocaine trade started to become a growing and significant problem for American law enforcement as the drug's prevalence began to quickly takeoff in unanticipated ways. Initially, its first phase of substantial growth in popularity started out in the entertainment industry in Hollywood before quickly spreading to other major hotspots such as Miami.

Because of cocaine's socially prestigious reputation as a cultural symbol of high status especially as it related to wealth and glamour among Americans during the late 1970s (mainly due to its high cost), Colombian criminals who were already accomplished smugglers of various goods through black market trade networks began to see cocaine as an irresistibly lucrative item for smuggling. A product like cocaine, which "packs tighter" than other types of drugs or contraband, indicated a greater, more eased potential for logistical transportability, with less of a chance for interdiction or complications during the product's long journey across borders and to various regional markets around the globe. This further maximized the drug's profit potential, since its volume and weight relative to its final monetary value was now exponentially greater compared to trafficking the same or similar weight and volume of a less valuable product such as marijuana. Also, unlike marijuana, which can be produced near to desirable North American drug markets, cocaine production was almost exclusive to South America at this time and therefore easier for regional criminal groups to control and monopolize.

During this era, smugglers or trafficking groups were composed of Colombian nationals. Pablo Escobar became characterized by his strategy of providing protection to other smugglers who partnered with him and helped further distribute the organization's cocaine into markets of high demand such as New York City and eventually Miami. Thus after forming a larger web of suppliers and combined trade networks that continually benefited Escobar and his cousin's operations, enabled by a newly formed, mutually beneficial effort between different drug traffickers now working together (hence the term cartel), the organization was able to, at its height, move around 2,500-3,500 kilos per day.

The criminal power structure already present within Pablo and Gustavo's earlier, informal organization or smuggling ring rose to prominence as a result of cocaine's unusually high profit margins; even after just brief exposure to the North American market and its respective distribution channels, the organization's influence over the global cocaine business increased dramatically, which was naturally followed by unprecedented amounts of wealth. The then "cartel-style" model for Pablo and Gustavo's criminal organization began to reach fruition between 1976 and 1979, when it also incorporated the contraband smuggling networks of the Ochoas (Jorge Luis Ochoa Vásquez, Fabio Ochoa Vásquez and Juan David Ochoa Vásquez), as well as the trafficking enterprise and muscle (armed men) working under José Gonzalo Rodríguez Gacha; nicknamed "the Mexican", and the eccentric German Colombian figure Carlos Lehder, who initially partnered up with American smuggler George Jung or "Boston George", with whom he was bunkmates in prison at the Federal Correctional Institution, Danbury where Jung was incarcerated at the same time as Lehder on charges of marijuana trafficking.

Prior to this, Escobar's initial smuggling ring consisted of small gangs of hired gunmen on his payroll was just a precursor to the final and fully-fledged massive criminal organization that came to be known as the Medellín Cartel. Once these aforementioned drug lords stepped in to combine their trafficking power and capabilities, and after the ever-growing demand for their product in the North American market started to be recognized, the term cartel came into play, even if they did not originally refer to themselves as such. The term cartel, in reference to the mercantile nature of this now ever-expanding Colombian drug trafficking oligopoly, seems to have been first coined by the US State Department in order to distinguish these higher-level criminal organizations from the traditional, mid-sized gangs commonly associated with the drug trade. Eventually, with the cartel label becoming a household name, it was later embraced by the organization during its later years. This economic control, resulting from the unification of power structures of once separate groups, gave way to a sort of financial positive feedback loop, where further profits after the Medellín Cartel's initial expansion led to an even greater level of power and growth, leading to even more profits in the process.

==== Carlos Lehder and George Jung (1976–1978) ====
Jung described the Danbury prison facility located in Connecticut as a "medium-low security prison" that was "full of mob guys". He goes on to point out the "irony" (likely due to his marijuana charges) of him being assigned Colombian Carlos Lehder as a bunkmate who was serving a sentence for stealing cars and shipping them to South America. They casually discussed their charges, Jung mentioning he was caught flying marijuana out of Mexico; Lehder responded by asking him if he "knew anything about cocaine". He did not at the time, but became immediately entranced when Lehder went on to say; "you know it costs $60,000 a kilo". A proclamation that functioned as a compelling sales pitch for Jung; they both waited until getting out before attempting to get involved in the cocaine business.

While incarcerated together, Jung benefited Lehder by giving him valuable input and tips on how to smuggle drugs effectively. Jung was knowledgeable in this area due to his past experience flying shipments of marijuana across international borders—from Mexico into the US, and within the US, from California to New England. Lehder, however, would also be of benefit to Jung, once they were both released from prison, by introducing him to Colombia's most powerful drug smuggler: Pablo Escobar. This would prove useful to Jung in the future, when later he and Lehder had a falling out and were no longer in business together.

Around 1976, both men were out of prison (Jung being released slightly after Lehder). Lehder's behavior became increasingly erratic, supposedly "crazed" and "megalomaniacal" in the last two or three years of the 1970s, spiraling even further during the early 1980s. By decade's end (around 1978), Lehder had betrayed Jung. Lehder did this by trying to push Jung out of the business and began setting up his own major cocaine transshipment operation for Escobar and the Medellín organization on an island in the Bahamas called Norman's Cay. Here, Lehder would take up an unconventional, hedonistic, drug-fueled lifestyle after getting the island's residents to leave, either by force or by bribery. Jung from that point on just attempted to steer clear of Lehder, so he simply went back to Colombia to meet with Escobar directly, in order to establish a new, but now more modestly-sized, trafficking endeavor. This was to continue to operate under Escobar's network, since the two still had a good relationship, and Escobar could directly utilize Lehder as a reliable connection for acquiring sizable amounts of South American powdered cocaine.

From 1976 to 1978, George Jung and Carlos Lehder operated a high volume cocaine distribution network that significantly expanded the Medellín Cartel's access to the United States' market. Prior to their involvement, Colombian traffickers lacked a large scale transportation system and primarily relied on small scale smuggling methods. By utilizing commercial scale aviation and establishing a transshipment hub, Jung and Lehder provided the logistical infrastructure required to meet American demand. Their operation accelerated the financial and operational growth of the early Medellín conglomerate, establishing a logistics model that underpinned the cartel's subsequent expansion.

==== From independent smuggling ring to collaborative cartel (1976–1979) ====
Pablo Escobar and his cousin Gustavo's mid-70s newly transformed trafficking operation aimed at moving cocaine powder into America after first fully ascertaining the indispensable distribution network capabilities and other logistical elements both Carlos Lehder and George Jung could facilitate for the sale of their product in the now major emerging markets was about to undergo another type of expansion. After carrying out their new cocaine operations with this augmented distribution system, this soon led the two cousins (Pablo and Gustavo) to amass a staggering amount of wealth in such a short timeframe (primarily due to Jung and Lehder), that their other fellow Colombian criminal acquaintances who were already noteworthy regional figures in the smuggling world, such as José Rodriguez Gacha and the Ochoas who were not yet part of the organization but began to more seriously consider getting involved with the two cousins and the cocaine business eventually came into the fold.

At this point, Pablo and Gustavo converged the increasing power and wealth of their single "independent" smuggling-ring towards a conglomerate made up of the multiple aforementioned smuggling rings coupled together in a collaborative fashion so as to give the overall organization a stronger backbone and structural apparatus by allowing Gacha and the Ochoas to pair up and synergize the relative power-spheres of their own trafficking networks with Escobar's, so as to maximize and concentrate their power instead of keeping it divided. After seeing the results of Pablo and Gustavo's impressive rates of profit and success (which now surpassed the Ochoas), they all soon began to prioritize the smuggling of cocaine over virtually all other forms of 'goods' and contraband, such as the items of commerce that had already served to profit them in years past.

==== 1980s cocaine boom ====
This lucrative and newfound, expansive network of traffickers began to utilize different methods of getting their cocaine product into the U.S., ranging from cocaine-stuffed hollow pellets, multilayered condoms, or balloons which are then swallowed by mules to make it through customs or international borders (especially in commercial flight transportation) without detection, to hefty amounts loaded onto Cessnas; these now being recognized as preferred methods for smugglers through the years because of their ability to fly slowly which permits more accurate deliveries to drop zones. Some smuggling strategies also purportedly included diverting law-enforcement's attention away from one smuggled load of cocaine in order to smuggle in an even larger amount when authorities' attention and related interdiction resources were distracted or compromised. These innovations in illegal drug trafficking techniques by increasingly well-funded organized criminal groups; such as Escobar and his Medellín associates proved to be too much for American law enforcement to effectively catch up with or curtail, especially with the price of cocaine dropping by 1980 and becoming yet even more popular and now among a much wider demographic instead of mostly just the affluent as it was in the late 70s. This would inevitably result in the manifestation of widespread cocaine use and cultural normalization, simultaneous crime waves in almost all major US cities, as well as small "drug wars" within relevant transshipment point areas or cities like Miami (see: Miami drug war) as well as in the ghettos of Los Angeles (see: Freeway Ricky Ross). Therefore, by the turn of the decade it was no longer just a drug of the sybaritic and wealthy despite still being a cultural status symbol of class and wealth in the early 80s.

The United States' "cocaine boom" era enriched the Colombian smugglers and catapulted them into massive levels of profit and wealth that now was in the billions of dollars, essentially all in the form of cash. During the cartel's peak, Escobar oversaw the import of large shipments of coca paste from Andean nations such as Peru and Bolivia into Colombia, where it was then processed into powdered cocaine in jungle labs such as in the case of Tranquilandia, before being flown into the United States in amounts of up to 15 tons per day at some points.

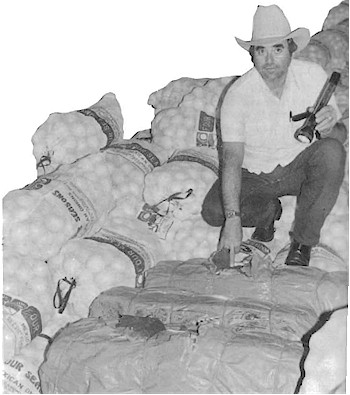
A U.S. Marshals Deputy seizing smuggled cocaine during the 1980s

By 1982, cocaine surpassed coffee as the chief Colombian export (see: Coffee production in Colombia). Around this time in the early 1980s, kidnappings made by guerrilla groups led the State to collaborate with criminal groups like those formed by Escobar and the Ochoas. The abduction of Carlos Lehder as well as the 1981 kidnapping of the sister of the Ochoas; Martha Ochoa which led to the creation of cartel-funded private armies that were created to fight off guerrillas who were trying to either redistribute their lands to local peasants, kidnap them, or extort the gramaje money that the Revolutionary Armed Forces of Colombia (Fuerzas Armadas Revolucionarias de Colombia or FARC) attempted to steal.

=== "Death to Kidnappers" (1981) ===
At the end of 1981 and the beginning of 1982, members of the Medellín Cartel, Cali Cartel, the Colombian military, the U.S.-based corporation Texas Petroleum, the Colombian legislature, small industrialists, and wealthy cattle ranchers came together in a series of meetings in Puerto Boyacá and formed a paramilitary organization known as Muerte a Secuestradores ("Death to Kidnappers", MAS) to defend their economic interests, and to provide protection for local elites from kidnappings and extortion. By 1983, Colombian internal affairs had registered 240 political killings by MAS death squads, mostly community leaders, elected officials, and farmers.

The following year, the Asociación Campesina de Ganaderos y Agricultores del Magdalena Medio ("Association of Middle Magdalena Ranchers and Farmers", ACDEGAM) was created to handle both the logistics and the public relations of the organization, and to provide a legal front for various paramilitary groups. ACDEGAM worked to promote anti-labor policies, and threatened anyone involved with organizing for labor or peasants' rights. The threats were backed up by the MAS, which would attack or assassinate anyone who was suspected of being a "subversive". ACDEGAM also built schools whose stated purpose was the creation of a "patriotic and anti-Communist" educational environment, and built roads, bridges, and health clinics. Paramilitary recruiting, weapons storage, communications, propaganda, and medical services were all run out of ACDEGAM headquarters.

By the mid-1980s, ACDEGAM and MAS had undergone significant growth. In 1985, Pablo Escobar began funneling large amounts of cash into the organization to pay for equipment, training, and weaponry. Money for social projects was cut off and redirected towards strengthening the MAS. Modern battle rifles, such as the AKM, FN FAL, IMI Galil, and HK G3, were purchased from the military, INDUMIL, and drug-funded private sales. The organization had computers and ran a communications center that worked in coordination with the state telecommunications office. They had 30 pilots, and an assortment of fixed-wing aircraft and helicopters. British, Israeli, and U.S. military instructors were hired to teach at paramilitary training centers.

=== Middle–late 1980s ===
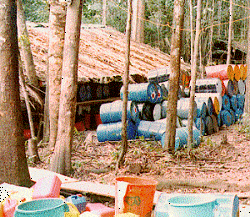
View of the tanks of ether at Tranquilandia, 1984.

Following this time in the mid-80s, Escobar's hold on Medellín further increased when he founded a criminal debt collection service known as the "Oficina de Envigado" (The Office), which was considered their first "oficina de cobro" (collections service). This was an actual physical office located in the town hall of Envigado, a small municipality next to Medellín where Escobar grew up. Escobar used the municipal office to collect debts owed to him by other drug traffickers and set the "sicarios" or hired killers on those who refused. Escobar was known to flaunt his wealth and went on to make Forbes' Billionaires list for seven years straight, between 1987 and 1993. His luxurious multimillion-dollar "Hacienda Nápoles" estate had its own zoo, and he reportedly ate from solid gold dinner sets. Escobar was known for investing profits from the drug trade in luxury goods, property, and works of art. He is also reported to have stashed his cash in "hidden coves", allegedly burying it on his farms and under floors in many of his houses.

=== Early 1990s ===
==== Pablo Escobar's death (December, 1993) ====
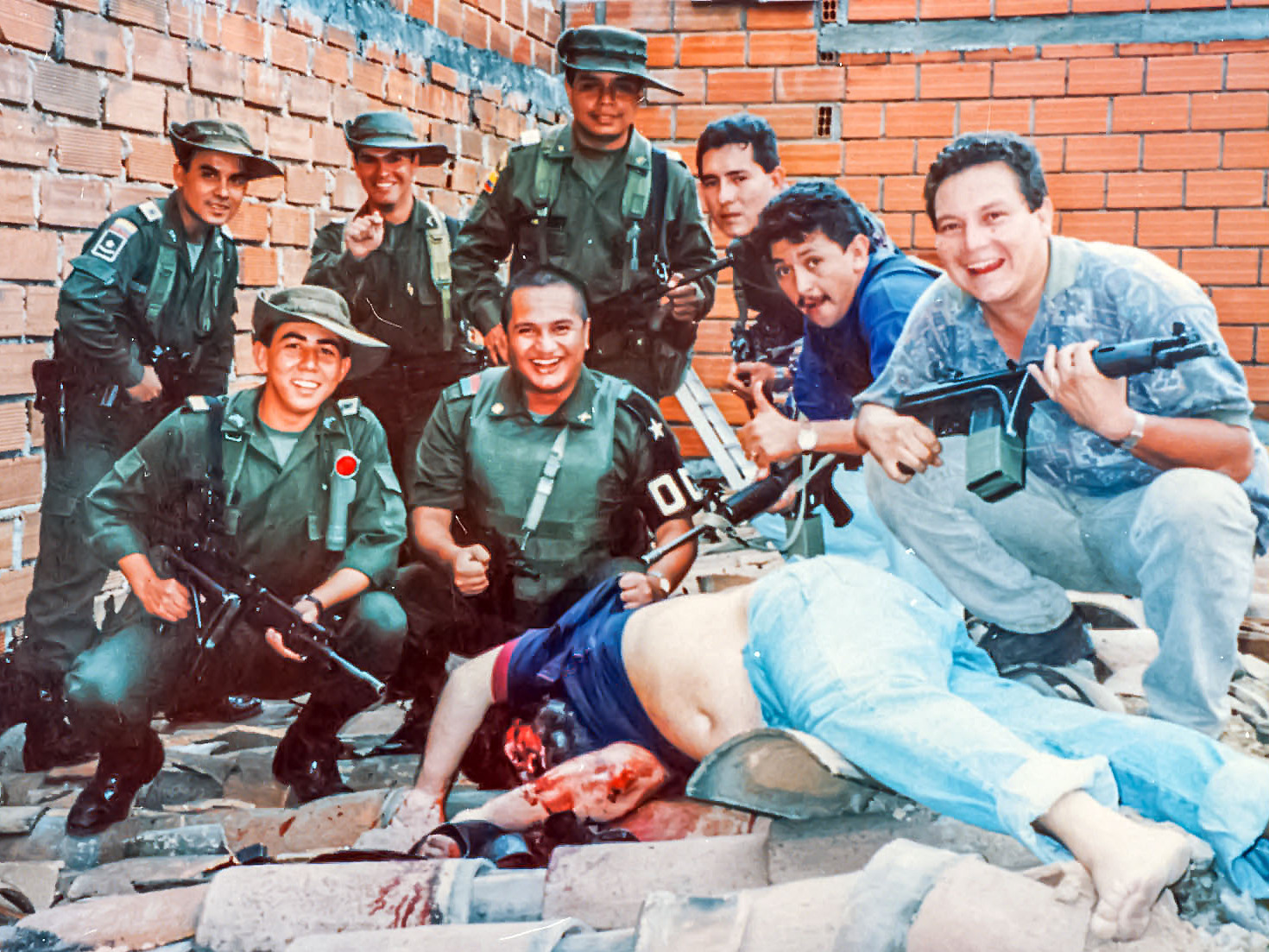
Members of Search Bloc kneeling over a deceased Escobar on December 2nd 1993 after a 16-month search effort.

After a long, drawn-out manhunt that lasted many months; on 2 December 1993 Escobar was finally found with only one bodyguard left by his side; Limón (Alvaro de Jesús Agudelo) who was also his longtime chauffeur (driver). They were found hiding out in a house in a middle-class residential area of his hometown of Medellín (Carrera 79B No. 45D – 94, Los Olivos neighborhood) by Colombian special forces supposedly using tracking technology provided by the United States. This was a direct consequence of Escobar the day before; on his 44th birthday (Wednesday), he made a call from the hideout location to his family who were being protected by the government in a luxury hotel in the nation's capital of Bogotá. This was also just after the family had returned from an unsuccessful attempt to travel by plane and take refuge in Germany. The authorities, going off the traceable data from the hotel which received Escobar's call began to utilize an electronic tracking system in order to pinpoint the geographical location where the call had originated from. At this time, Escobar, who now had a long beard according to witnesses, had apparently been hiding out there for almost six weeks. After some initial difficulty, both the drug lord and Limón were eventually located the next day. Police tried to arrest Escobar upon arrival, but the situation quickly escalated to an exchange of gunfire. By the time Pablo and Limón escaped the inside of the building and tried to outrun the authorities on a tiled terracotta rooftop, Limón was shot and killed. Moments later Escobar himself was shot and killed as he tried to flee from the pursuing officers whilst still running across the top of the roof to escape. He was hit by bullets in the torso and feet, and a bullet which struck him in the ear, killing him.

However, this has sparked debate about whether he killed himself or whether he was actually shot dead by the Colombian authorities, with his son Sebastián Marroquín (formerly named; Juan Pablo Escobar) still believing to this day that he shot himself due to the positioning of the bullet's entry wound behind his ear where he says his father would've apparently aimed for if he was going to attempt to kill himself. Escobar's primary objective in an end scenario such as this was simply to not allow himself to be captured alive and suffer for the rest of his life in the U.S. prison system via extradition, or to be captured and tortured like he did to so many others. Escobar's legacy remains controversial; while many denounce the heinous nature of his crimes and terrorism, he was still seen as a "Robin-Hood-like" figure for many in Colombia, as he provided many amenities such as the funding of infrastructure and residences for the poor, especially in barrios throughout the areas surrounding Medellín. His death was mourned and his funeral attended by over 25,000 people. Additionally, his private estate, Hacienda Nápoles was thereafter eventually transformed into a theme park. His life as a major cocaine trafficker and incredibly wealthy criminal (bandido) has been dramatized widely in film and has served as inspiration for pop cultural references and the retelling of his gripping story as a prominent drug lord in both television, books and music.

== Relations between the Medellín and Cali cartels ==
Traditionally, Pablo and the Medellín Cartel originally had a strategic alliance and specific smuggling arrangement with the Cali Cartel "godfathers" Gilberto Rodríguez Orejuela and Miguel Rodríguez Orejuela early on. This arrangement resulted in Medellín controlling the cocaine trade in Los Angeles, Cali controlling New York City, while both of them agreed to share Miami and Houston. Eventually however, a personal dispute between Escobar and one of the Cali Cartel leaders named Pacho Herrera surfaced over a disagreement on territory in one or more of these distribution hubs. Although the two organizations had skirmishes beforehand; by 1988 (supposedly after the Monaco Apartment bombing) the Medellín and Cali organizations became perpetual enemies, a feud which continued until Medellín's eventual demise in 1993. A demise which was largely due to the rise of the anti-Escobar "vigilante" group known as Los Pepes, which was officially formed in January 1993. "Los Pepes" was a diminutive form of the phrase "Perseguidos por Pablo Escobar" (meaning: "[Those] Persecuted by Pablo Escobar"). The group was largely financed by the Cali Cartel and led by brothers Carlos and Fidel Castaño whom were right-wing paramilitary leading commanders that were actually once part of the Medellín Cartel. Los Pepe's tactics, which were stylized to reflect Escobar's own violent methods now turned against him, and which proved ultimately instrumental to the progressive defeat of the Medellín Cartel reign, was further accentuated by Pablo's accumulation of enemies within his own organization (helping to characterize the formation of Los Pepes), as well as Pablo's ongoing and relentless war against the Colombian government and American law-enforcement agencies; a combination of factors which cornered Escobar during the last year of his life, along with his quickly diminishing sphere of power as the now final and last-standing leader of his once dominant cartel.

During the initial days of their mutual alliance however, before these intense conflicts; the Cali and Medellín groups each showcased differing philosophies over how to "ameliorate" their situations with the authorities. While the more 'businesslike' Orejuela brothers of Cali wanted to solve such legal issues through corruption, Escobar instead sought to do so mostly through violence and intimidation. Particularly when his (often minimal) attempts to bribe officials were not immediately accepted. Notably, Escobar and the Medellín crew also garnered a unique reputation, even in their earlier days for murdering not only those who crossed them, but oftentimes their immediate family members or other relatives as well, unless otherwise stipulated such as when Pablo's enemies "turned themselves in" instead of fleeing the region or pleading for protection from the authorities (many of whom were already compromised). This method of "webbed" violence was reportedly explained to American smuggler George Jung when he first met Pablo in 1978, moments after witnessing a man get shot in the chest after he "voluntarily" gave himself up to Escobar upon the knowledge that his entire family would be killed if he did not.

While Pablo Escobar seemingly viewed fear through violence and extortion (threats) as an effective motivator and more straightforward measure, Cali leader Gilberto in particular thought violence should only be used as a last resort, considering it to be generally bad for business due to the practical understanding that; "dead people do not pay what they owe". The Cali Cartel leaders even required their employees to fill out "application forms"; elucidating their personal information, not necessarily for the sake of threats but rather for the purpose of thorough background checks and security. This included not just names and addresses of Cali Cartel hopefuls, but financial assets and personal possessions such as automobiles. The Orejuela brothers wanted to be seen as "the Kennedys of Colombia" while Escobar similarly dreamed of one day becoming president of the nation. When this failed however due to scandals over his criminal reputation, Escobar thereafter began a brutal; nearly decade-long terroristic campaign against the government from April of 1984 starting with the assassination of Rodrigo Lara Bonilla (Colombia's Minister of Justice who favored extradition), to April of 1993 with the massive 440 pound bomb detonation in Bogotá's busy Center 93 shopping mall on the city's popular 15th Avenue neighborhood.

== Political relations ==
During the later years of the Cold War, the number of left-wing guerrillas in Latin America skyrocketed. The conflicts between them and the right-wing paramilitaries groups and dictatorships, mostly backed by CIA, made the Cartel search for new allies while it was forced to be involved in corruption outside Colombia for political protection.

=== Relations with the Colombian government ===
Once U.S. authorities were made aware of "questionable activities", the group was put under Federal Drug Task Force surveillance. Evidence was gathered, compiled, and presented to a grand jury, resulting in indictments, arrests, and prison sentences for those convicted in the United States. However, very few Colombian cartel leaders were actually taken into custody as a result of these operations. Mostly, non-Colombians conspiring with the cartel were the "fruits" of these indictments in the United States.

Most Colombians targeted, as well as those named in such indictments, lived and stayed in Colombia, or fled before indictments were unsealed. However, by 1993 most, if not all, cartel fugitives had been either imprisoned, or located and shot dead, by the Colombian National Police trained and assisted by specialized military units and the CIA.

The last of Escobar's lieutenants to be assassinated was Juan Diego Arcila Henao, who had been released from a Colombian prison in 2002 and hidden in Venezuela to avoid the vengeance of "Los Pepes". However he was shot and killed in his Jeep Cherokee as he exited the parking area of his home in Cumaná, Venezuela, in April 2007.

While it is broadly believed that Los Pepes have been instrumental in the assassination of the cartel's members over the last 21 years, it is still in dispute whether the mantle is just a screen designed to deflect political repercussions from both the Colombian and United States governments' involvement in these assassinations.

=== Relations with Nicaraguan government ===
The Carlos Lehder's Norman's Cay strategy was shut down in 1982 after the Bahamian government started chasing the drug traffic. Hence, Central America was the path chosen by the Cartel to reach the US. In 1985, the DEA, knowing about Barry Seal ties with both the Medellin Cartel, made the pilot take pictures of the cartel's landing strips in Nicaragua. The DEA prior investigation appointed that the cartel had the protection from the FSLN, the Sandinist party, to use Nicaragua as a "warehouse" for Matta-Ballesteros' logistic operation for either Medellin and Guadalajara cartels.

Knowing Seal's activity as a DEA informant, the cartel put a contract on him, having him murdered in February 1986. In 16 March the same year, during a TV national address, the president of the United States Ronald Reagan used surveillance pictures taken on Seal's undercover mission that showed Escobar, Gacha, the Nicaraguan government official Federico Vaughan and several other men loading a plane with cocaine.

=== Relations with Panamanian government ===
After Manuel Noriega's arrest, the DEA and FBI got several tips linking the former dictator to the Medellin Cartel. The Nicaraguan and Colombian conflicts in remote areas could make both countries unsafe to operate, and the cartel was searching for new places to use as a stopover. Manuel Noriega, in exchange of bribes and share on profits, agreed using Panama as another stopover for the cartel logistics. Also, the links between him and the Cartel ensured that Panama could be a hideout for the group leadership and that the government would ignore their money laundering operations in the country.

The CIA turned a blind eye to the link between Medellin Cartel and Noriega, as he had an aggressive anti-communist policy. However, the agency stopped supporting Noriega after his ties with the Cartel came to public.

=== Relations with Cuban government ===
During the 1980s, the decreased and later end of Soviet Union subsidies almost wiped out the Cuban economy. During Manuel Noriega's trial, Carlos Lehder, the cartel member responsible for ensuring that the cocaine would reach Florida, testified that, as the drug smuggling to the US was making billions of dollars, Cuban intelligence helped manage Nicaraguan operations and the island's government agreed to use Cuba as one of the stopovers for the cartel. This was done with knowledge of the Castro brothers, having the younger, Raúl Castro, meet with Lehder.

== Fear of extradition ==
Perhaps the greatest threat posed to the Medellín Cartel and the other traffickers was the implementation of an extradition treaty between the United States and Colombia. It allowed Colombia to extradite to the US any Colombian suspected of drug trafficking and to be tried there for their crimes. This was a major problem for the cartel, since the drug traffickers had little access to their local power and influence in the US, and a trial there would most likely lead to imprisonment. Among the staunch supporters of the extradition treaty were Colombian Justice Minister Rodrigo Lara (who was pushing for more action against the drug cartels), Police Officer Jaime Ramírez, and numerous Colombian Supreme Court judges.

However, the cartel applied a "bend or break" strategy towards several of these supporters, using bribery, extortion, or violence. Nevertheless, when police efforts began to cause major losses, some of the major drug lords themselves were temporarily pushed out of Colombia, forcing them into hiding from which they ordered cartel members to take out key supporters of the extradition treaty.

The cartel issued death threats to the Supreme Court Judges, asking them to denounce the Extradition Treaty. The warnings were ignored. This led Escobar and the group he called Los Extraditables ("The Extraditables") to start a violent campaign to pressure the Colombian government by committing a series of kidnappings, murders, and narco-terrorist actions.

== Alleged relation with the M-19 ==
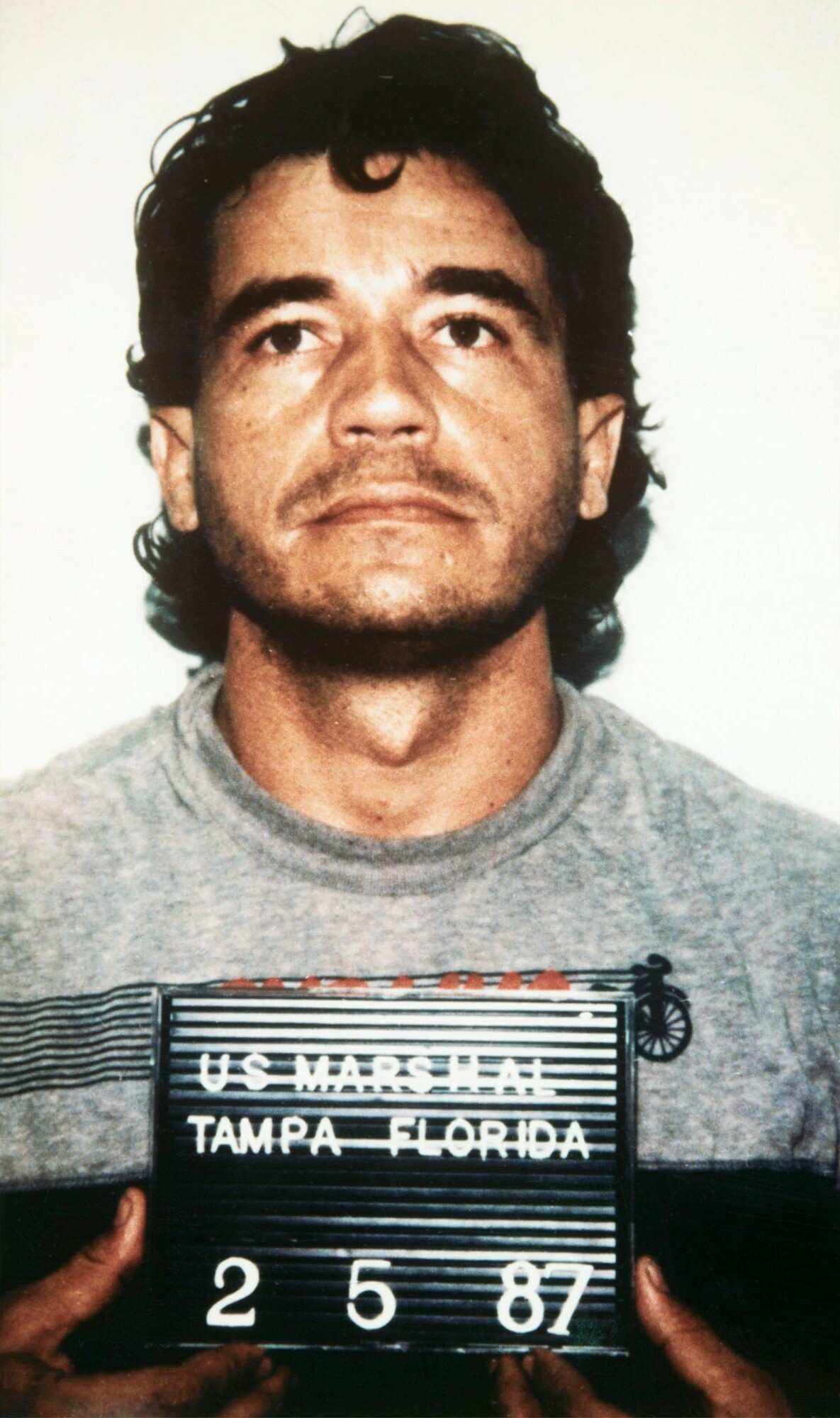
Carlos Lehder

In November 1985, 35 heavily armed members of the M-19 guerrilla group stormed the Colombian Supreme Court in Bogotá, leading to the Palace of Justice siege. Some claimed at the time that the cartel's influence was behind the M-19's raid, because of its interest in intimidating the Supreme Court. Others state that the alleged cartel-guerrilla relationship was unlikely to occur at the time because the two organizations had been having several standoffs and confrontations, like the kidnappings by M-19 of drug lord Carlos Lehder and of Marta Nieves Ochoa, the sister of Juan David Ochoa. These kidnappings led to the creation of the MAS/Muerte a Secuestradores ("Death to Kidnappers") paramilitary group by Pablo Escobar. Former guerrilla members have also denied that the cartel had any part in this event. The issue continues to be debated inside Colombia.

== Assassinations ==
As a means of intimidation, the cartel conducted thousands of assassinations throughout the country. Escobar and his associates made it clear that whoever stood against them would risk being killed along with their families. Some estimates put the total around 3,500 killed during the height of the cartel's activities, including over 500 police officers in Medellín, but the entire list is impossible to assemble, due to the limitation of the judiciary power in Colombia. The following is a brief list of the most notorious assassinations conducted by the cartel:

- Luis Vasco and Gilberto Hernandez, two DAS agents who had arrested Pablo Escobar in 1976. Among the earliest assassinations of authority figures by the cartel.
- Rodrigo Lara, Minister of Justice, killed on a Bogotá highway on 30 April 1984, when two gunmen riding a motorcycle approached his vehicle in traffic and opened fire.
- Tulio Manuel Castro Gil, Superior Court Judge who indicted Escobar for the murder of Lara Bonilla. Killed by motorcycle gunmen in July 1985.
- Hernando Baquero Borda, Supreme Court Justice; rapporteur and defender of the Extradition Treaty with the United States, killed by gunmen in Bogotá on 31 July 1986.
- Jaime Ramírez Gómez, Police Colonel and head of the anti-narcotics unit of the National Police of Colombia. Killed near Fontibon on his way to Bogotá on 17 November 1986, when assassins in a green Renault 18 drove beside his red Mitsubishi Montero and opened fire. Ramírez was killed instantly; his wife and two sons were unharmed.
- Guillermo Cano Isaza, director of El Espectador who revealed publicly Escobar's criminal past, killed on 17 December 1986, in Bogotá by gunmen riding a motorcycle.
- Jaime Pardo Leal, presidential candidate and head of the Patriotic Union party, killed by a gunman in October 1987.
- Carlos Mauro Hoyos, Attorney General, kidnapped then killed by gunmen in Medellín in January 1988.
- Antonio Roldan Betancur, governor of Antioquia, killed by a car bomb in July 1989.
- Waldemar Franklin Quintero, Commander of the Antioquia police, killed by gunmen in Medellín in August 1989.
- Luis Carlos Galán, presidential candidate, killed by gunmen during a rally in Soacha in August 1989. The assassination was carried out on the same day the commander of the Antioquia police was gunned down by the cartel.
- Carlos Ernesto Valencia, Superior Judge, killed by gunmen shortly after indicting Escobar on the death of Guillermo Cano, in August 1989.
- Jorge Enrique Pulido, journalist, director of Jorge Enrique Pulido TV, killed by gunmen in Bogotá in November 1989.
- Diana Turbay, journalist, chief editor of the Hoy por Hoy magazine and former president Julio César Turbay Ayala's daughter, killed by Colombian military during a rescue attempt in January 1991. Actually, the bullet found in her body came from a police helicopter.
- Enrique Low Murtra, Minister of Justice, killed by gunmen in downtown Bogotá in May 1991.
- Myriam Rocio Velez, Superior Judge, killed by gunmen shortly before she was to sentence Escobar on the assassination of Galán, in September 1992.

Miguel Maza Márquez was targeted in the DAS Building Bombing, resulting in the death of 52 civilians caught in the blast. Miguel escaped unharmed.

In 1993, shortly before Escobar's death, the cartel lieutenants were also targeted by the vigilante group Los Pepes (or PEPES, People Persecuted by Pablo Escobar).

With the assassination of Juan Diego Arcila Henao in 2007, most if not all of Escobar's lieutenants who were not in prison had been killed by the Colombian National Police Search Bloc (trained and assisted by U.S. Delta Force and CIA operatives), or by the Los Pepes vigilantes.

DEA agents considered that their four-pronged "Kingpin Strategy", specifically targeting senior cartel figures, was a major contributing factor to the collapse of the organization.

== Legacy ==
La Oficina de Envigado is believed to be a partial successor to the Medellín organization. It was founded by Don Berna as an enforcement wing for the Medellín Cartel. When Don Berna fell out with Escobar, La Oficina caused Escobar's rivals to oust Escobar. The organization then inherited the Medellín turf and its criminal connections in the US, Mexico, and the UK, and began to affiliate with the paramilitary United Self-Defense Forces of Colombia, organizing drug trafficking operations on their behalf.

== In popular culture ==
The cartel has been both featured and referenced in numerous works of popular culture.

- Kings of Cocaine: Inside the Medellín Cartel - An Astonishing True Story of Murder, Money and International Corruption, Book by Guy Gugliotta
- Blow: 2001 film about drug smuggler George Jung, Carlos Lehder (named Diego Delgado in the film) and the Medellín Cartel
- Narcos is a Netflix original television series (2015–2017) that chronicles the life of Pablo Escobar and the rise of the Medellín Cartel. The first and second season depict his rise to the status of a powerful drug lord as well his narcoterrorist acts, war against the Colombian government and finally, his death. The role of Escobar is played by Brazilian actor Wagner Moura. The Medellín organization is also briefly depicted and mentioned in the spinoff series Narcos: Mexico.
- Cocaine Cowboys and Cocaine Cowboys 2: documentary series about the Miami drug war and Griselda Blanco
- American Desperado: a book by journalist Evan Wright and former Medellín Cartel trafficker Jon Roberts
- The Two Escobars: an ESPN 30 for 30 film details the link between the Medellín Cartel and the rise of Colombian football
- American Made: 2017 fictionalised film about drug smuggler Barry Seal (Tom Cruise) and the Medellín Cartel, led by Jorge Ochoa (Alejandro Edda)
- Season 2 episode 7 of Deadliest Warrior pitted the Medellín Cartel against the Somali Pirates with Michael Corleone Blanco, Son Of Griselda Blanco and gangster turned informant Kenny "Kenji" Gallo testing the cartel's weapons.
- Sicario: 2015 film follows the story of an FBI agent on a classified mission working with a representative for the Medellín cartel.

== See also ==
- Colombian Conflict
- Drug barons of Colombia
- Miami drug war
- Narcoterrorism
- Narcotrafficking in Colombia
- Tranquilandia
- Max Mermelstein
- Mickey Munday
- Jack Carlton Reed
- Virginia Vallejo
