= Carlos Lehder =

Colombian drug trafficker (born 1949)

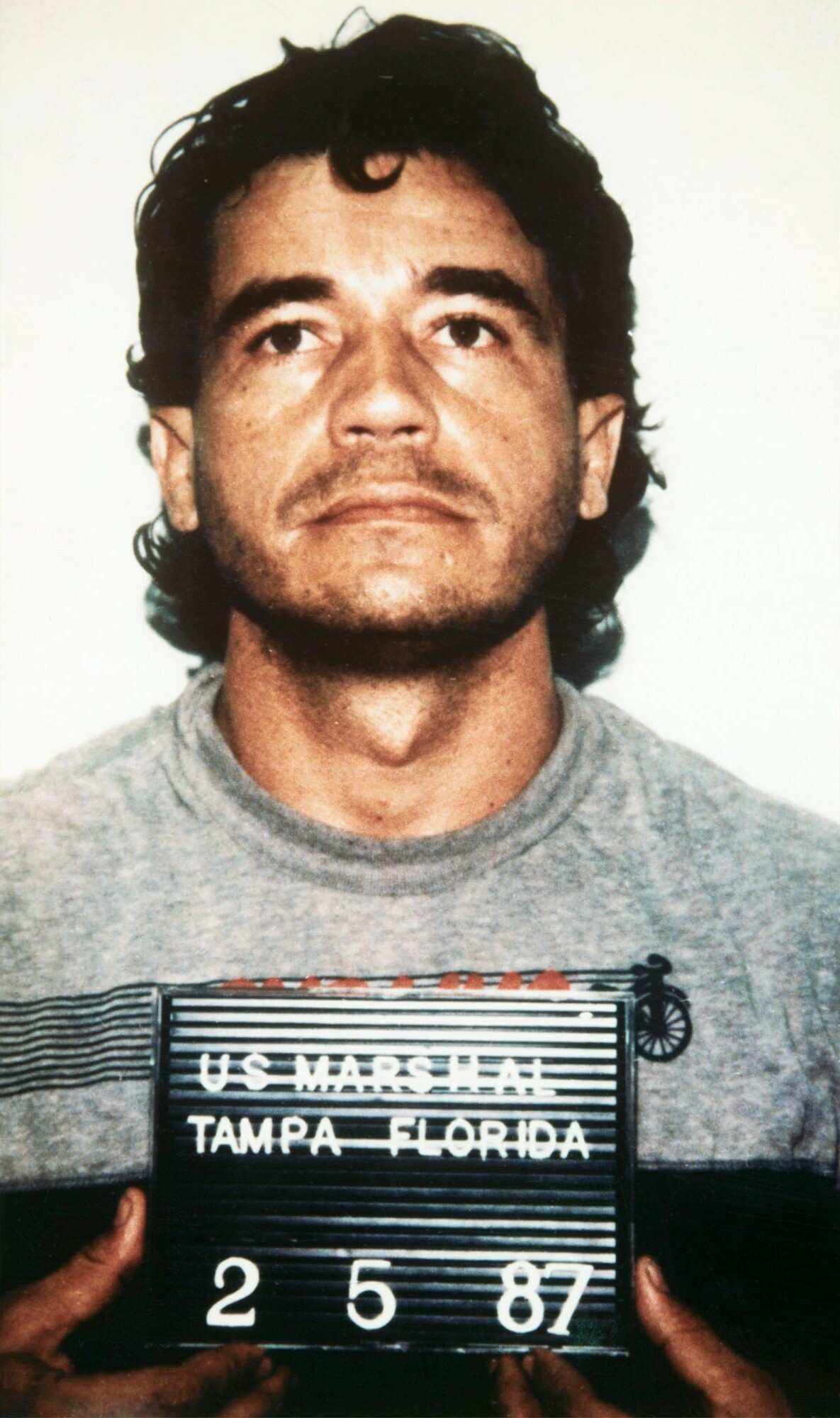
- Mugshot of Carlos Lehder after his extradition in 1987.
- Born: Carlos Enrique Lehder Rivas; 7 September 1949 (age 77); Armenia, Colombia
- Other names: El Loco (The Madman); Henry Ford of cocaine 'Rambo' González
- Occupation: Drug trafficker
- Children: Diana Lehder; Maria Del Mar Lehder; Mónica Lehder García
- Parent(s): Klaus Wilhelm Rudolf Lehder; Helena Rivas
- Status: Released from prison 16 June 2020, after more than 33 years and 4 months in captivity.
- Criminal charges: drug trafficking
- Penalty: Life imprisonment plus 135 years; commuted to 55 years in prison

Carlos Enrique Lehder Rivas (born 7 September 1949) is a Colombian and German former drug lord who was co-founder of the Medellín Cartel. Born to a German father and Colombian mother, he was the first high-level drug trafficker extradited to the United States, after which he was released from prison in the United States after 33 years in 2020. Originally from Armenia, Colombia, Lehder eventually ran a cocaine transport empire on Norman's Cay island, 210 miles (340 km) off the Florida coast in the central Bahamas.

Lehder was one of the founding members of Muerte a Secuestradores ("MAS"), a paramilitary group whose focus was to retaliate against the kidnappings of cartel members and their families by the guerrillas. His motivation to join the MAS was to retaliate against the M-19 guerrilla movement, which, in November 1981, attempted to kidnap him for a ransom; Lehder managed to escape from the kidnappers, though he was shot in the leg. He was one of the most important MAS and Medellin Cartel operators, and is considered to be one of the most important Colombian drug kingpins to have been successfully prosecuted in the United States.

Additionally, Lehder "founded a neo-Nazi political party, the National Latin Movement, whose main function, police said, appeared to be to force Colombia to abrogate its extradition treaty with the United States."

== Early life ==
Carlos Lehder is of mixed German-Colombian descent. His father, Klaus Wilhelm Lehder, was an engineer who emigrated from Germany to Armenia, Colombia in 1928, where he participated in the construction of several buildings which had elevators, a rather modern and unusual characteristic at that place and time. When he married Helena Rivas, former beauty queen and the daughter of a jeweller from Manizales, Caldas, he changed his name to Guillermo Lehder. Guillermo and Helena had four sons, with Carlos Enrique, born on 7 September 1949, being the third.

In Armenia, Colombia, the family owned a small inn called Pensión Alemana (which would later inspire Carlos to have his own luxurious Posada Alemana hotel), where German immigrants would regularly meet. They also ran a small business producing vegetable oils and importing luxury goods such as wine and canned foods. In 1943, following intelligence reports from the United States, the Lehders, along with many Germans in Colombia, were suspected of ideological links with the Nazis and were investigated. The Pensión Alemana was alleged to have been a place where Nazis gathered intelligence.

Carlos grew up in Armenia, Colombia until his parents divorced when he was 15, after which he emigrated with his mother to New York in the United States.

== Criminal career ==
=== Early activities and prison ===
Lehder dropped out of school to devote himself to reading books by authors such as Niccolò Machiavelli and Hermann Hesse, while maintaining admiration for Adolf Hitler's Mein Kampf.

Lehder started out selling stolen cars and smuggling them to Colombia, where the vehicles arrived in Medellín, avoiding all customs, and were then trafficked by Lehder's brother. At the age of 24, Lehder took aviation classes, becoming an expert pilot who would know several air routes, which served as the basis for his growing criminal career, which began with small-quantity marijuana trafficking between the United States and Canada. While serving a sentence for car theft in federal prison in Danbury, Connecticut, Lehder decided that, upon his release, he would take advantage of the burgeoning market for cocaine in the United States. To that goal, he enlisted his prison bunkmate, former marijuana dealer George Jung, as a future partner. Jung had experience flying marijuana to the U.S. from Mexico in small aircraft, staying below radar level, and landing on dry lake beds. Inspired by the idea, Lehder decided to apply the principle to cocaine transport and formed a partnership with Jung. While in prison, Lehder set out to learn as much information as possible that could be useful to him in the cocaine business. He would sometimes even spend hours questioning fellow inmates about money laundering and smuggling. Jung allegedly said that Lehder kept countless files and constantly took notes. Lehder's ultimate scheme was to revolutionize the cocaine trade by transporting the drug to the United States using small aircraft.

=== Early cocaine career ===
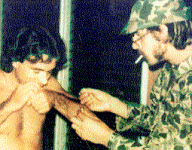
Carlos Lehder (left) snorting cocaine with former prison mate Steven Yakovac on Norman's Cay (1976)

Roman Varone and Jung had already experimented with bringing marijuana into the United States from Mexico in small aircraft below radar range and landing in dry riverbeds. Inspired by that idea, Lehder decided to apply the same principle to cocaine transport. After Lehder and Jung were released (both were paroled but Lehder was deported to Colombia), they built up a small revenue stream through simple, traditional drug smuggling. Specifically, they enlisted two young women who were US citizens to take a vacation to Antigua, receive cocaine, and carry it back with them to the U.S. in their suitcases. Repeating this process several times, Lehder and Jung soon had enough money for an airplane.

Using a small stolen plane and a professional pilot, the pair began to fly cocaine into the United States via the Bahamas, in the process increasing their financial resources and building connections and trust with Colombian suppliers, while spreading money around among Bahamian government officials for political and judicial protection. Their unconventional method of drug-smuggling began to gain credibility. The business had serious setbacks due to constant robberies by common criminals in the US. But marijuana trafficking, which had been very lucrative, came to an end due to the intense police operations in Colombia and a reduction in income due to the cultivation of marijuana in the US. This meant that cocaine trafficking, a profitable business with a more easily transportable product, was worth pursuing.

Lehder and his partners in the Cartel would amass enormous fortunes through cocaine trafficking, which is why they were nicknamed Los Mágicos (The Magicians), because they had become rich overnight, although Lehder was better known as the Henry Ford of cocaine.

=== Norman's Cay ===
In the late 1970s, the Lehder-Jung partnership began to diverge, due to some combination of Lehder's megalomania and his secret scheming to secure a personal Bahamian island as an all-purpose headquarters for his operations.

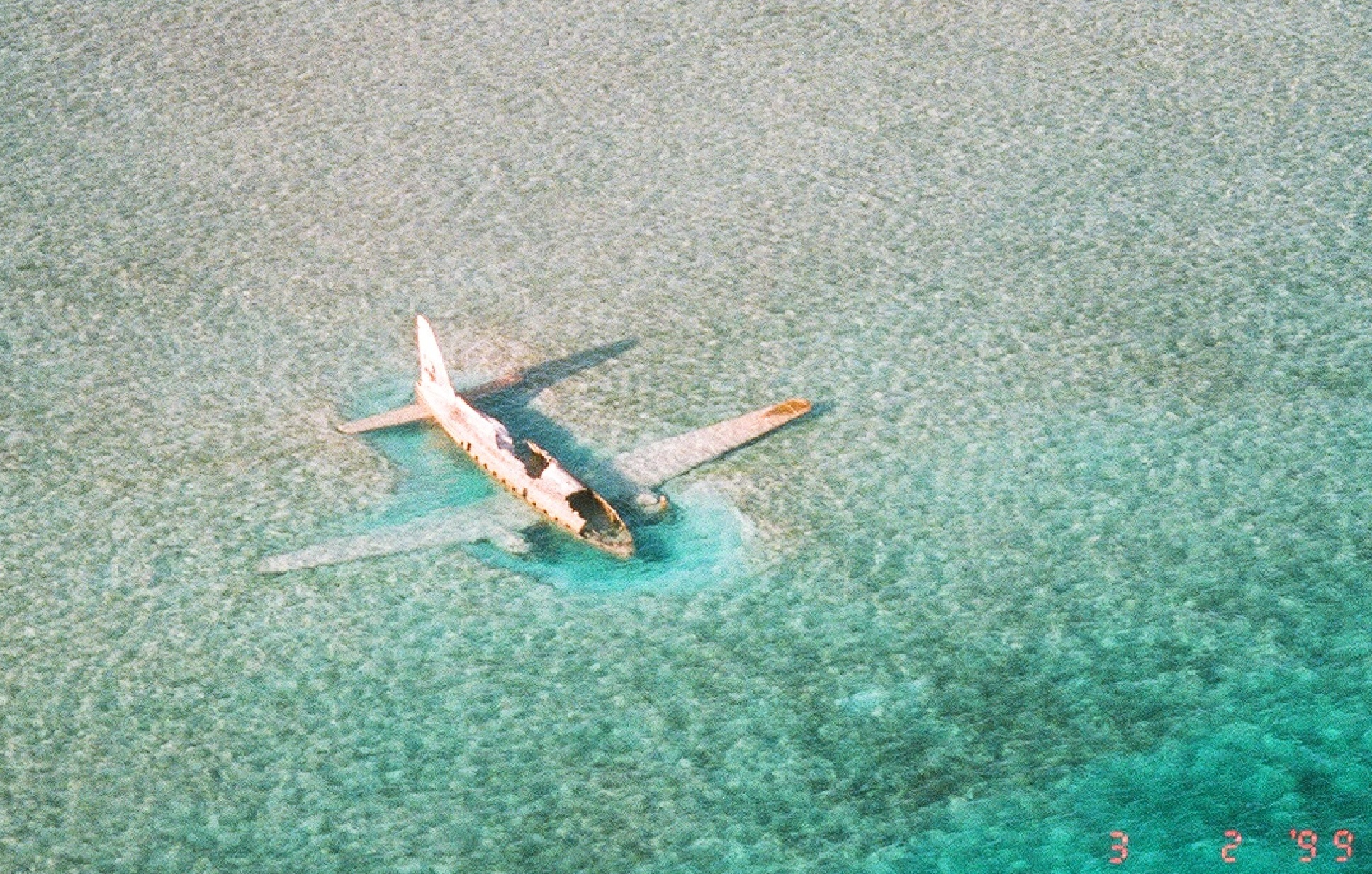
The wreckage of a Curtiss C-46 Commando that crashed in shallow water at Norman's Cay in November 1980 (1999)

That island was Norman's Cay, which at that point consisted of a marina, a yacht club, approximately 100 private homes, and an airstrip. In 1978, Lehder began buying up property and harassing and threatening the island's residents; at one point, a yacht was found drifting off the coast with the corpse of one of its owners aboard. Lehder is estimated to have spent $4.5 million on the island in total.

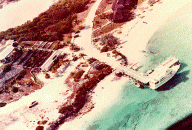
Norman's Cay in 1981

As Lehder paid or forced the local population to leave, and began to assume total control of the island, Norman's Cay became his lawless private fiefdom, after allegedly bribing the Prime Minister of the Bahamas Lynden Pindling. By this time, he had forced Jung out of the operation, and international criminal financier Robert Vesco had allegedly become a partner. Jung used his prior connections to take up a more modest line of independent smuggling for Pablo Escobar and stayed out of Lehder's way.

From 1978 through 1982, the Cay was the Caribbean's main drug-smuggling hub, and a tropical hideaway and playground for Lehder and associates. They flew cocaine in from Colombia on all sorts of aircraft able to land fully loaded on the airstrip, reloaded it into various small aircraft, and then distributed it to locations in Georgia, Florida, and the Carolinas. Lehder was believed to have kept one kilo out of every four that was transported through Norman's Cay.

Lehder expanded a runway to 3,300-foot (1,000 m), protected by radar, bodyguards, and Doberman attack dogs for the fleet of aircraft under his command. The island also had the Colombian flag flying above it, and the National Anthem of Colombia was often sung. At the height of his operation, 300 kilograms of cocaine would arrive on the island daily, and Lehder's wealth mounted into the billions. He accumulated such staggering wealth that on two occasions he offered to pay the Colombian external debt. In 1978, he made an offer to do so to President Alfonso López Michelsen, in exchange for a free space for drug trafficking. In 1982, through Pablo Escobar, who was a Colombian Congressman at the time, Lehder did so again, this time in an attempt to prevent his extradition. In 1981, the DEA and the Bahamas police intervened on the island dismantling the empire built by Lehder, who escaped capture and said goodbye to the island on July 10, 1982, by bombing Clifford Park in Nassau with pamphlets with the phrase DEA go home written on them. Some of those pamphlets had $100 bills attached to them.

== Return to Colombia ==
Lehder returned to Colombia where, in addition to resuming his business, he was recognized for giving the government of Quindío a modern plane Piper PA-31 Navajo for the time. Such a gift caught the attention of the authorities and the public because despite being used on several occasions, its high cost overruns forced its sale a year after it was legalized. It is believed that the plane had been secretly repurchased by Lehder taking advantage of its legalization, and said plane would travel anywhere in Colombia unnoticed, while the money given to the government for the sale of the aircraft was used to improve a hospital for the less favored classes, and mysteriously the plane would return to the El Eden airport in Armenia in poor condition.

Also called Man of the world and being a fan of The Beatles and The Rolling Stones, he became a bohemian in Quindío and in the midst of the coffee boom, showing a wealth comparable to any millionaire of the world, something very different from the wealthy classes of the time. Lehder, in turn, owned expensive cars, with license plates that some Armenians would bet their numbers in the regional lottery.

=== Participation in the MAS ===
On November 19, 1981, Lehder was kidnapped by the guerrilla movement M-19. Lehder escaped, while being wounded in the leg, and was helped by an unknown person, who not only rejected the million-dollar gratitude offered by Lehder but also did not know the identity of the drug trafficker. The failed kidnapping happened a week after the kidnapping of Martha Nieves Ochoa; which led to the creation of the paramilitary group MAS. Lehder offered a million-dollar reward for his ephemeral captors, several of whom had been kidnapped by Escobar for the kidnapping of the younger sister of his partners, who in turn would increase his security measures since then, hiring ex-agents from DAS, Sijin, army, etc., in addition to buying a luxurious limousine belonging to a former German chancellor with built-in weapons which were never used by Lehder. That limousine was stored in the Mónaco building and was one of the few surviving vehicles of the attack perpetrated by the Cali Cartel.

=== The National Latin Movement ===
In 1982, Belisario Betancur was elected president of Colombia. Lehder admired him for his almost homonymous origin since Betancur was a native of Amagá. After his election, Betancur declared a patrimonial amnesty, which Lehder took advantage of to legalize his money and assets. In addition, Lehder followed Escobar's example by dabbling in politics by founding the Movimiento Cívico Latino Nacional (National Latin Civic Movement), a political movement based on the principles of anti-communism, neo-Nazism, anti-colonialism, non-alignment, anti-fascism, anti-Zionism, and anti-Marxism-Leninism, as well as declaring itself Latin American, nationalist, regionalist, moralist, ecologist, Bolivarian, republican, Catholic, apostolic, and Roman, as well as supporting legalization of a Pan-American union similar to NATO, one with its own army and which is against the extradition of Colombians and Latin Americans to American prisons.

Extradition was by then a controversial issue for most sectors of Colombian society, especially for the members of the Medellín Cartel. Lehder began to be recognized by the US authorities thanks to Ed Worth, a former partner of Norman's Cay and Sears, and Lehder began to be investigated by the prosecutor Robert Merkle who traveled to Bogotá and presented said evidence before the Supreme Court of Justice of Colombia to study his extradition.

The newly created National Latin Movement (founded in the Posada Alemana) obtained the support of Luis Fernando Mejía, a renowned Pereiran poet and political mentor. The movement obtained more than 10,000 followers in the department of Quindío and with broad support in small towns and with a significant impact in large cities of the country, although becoming a serious adversary for the departmental political class, however, the origin of its Fortune drew the attention of the Colombian authorities who would know of his old businesses in Norman's Cay as well as several incidents in Miami due to wars between gangs associated with cocaine trafficking. On the other hand, the recently appointed Minister of Justice Rodrigo Lara Bonilla publicly denounced the leaking of "Dineros Calientes" (money of dubious origin) in political movements and in national soccer teams, while several sectors would accuse Lehder of handling illicit money for bribes. The Supreme Court of Justice authorized Lehder's extradition, although it had to be signed by President Betancur.

== Downfall ==
Their government's approval of the extradition of Colombians encouraged Escobar and Lehder to participate in politics. Lehder founded the National Latino Movement (Movimiento Latino Nacional, in Spanish), which managed three congressional seats, and popularized itself by making speeches against extradition.

The April 30, 1984 assassination of Rodrigo Lara Bonilla, the Colombian Minister of Justice, initiated the beginning of the end for Lehder and the Medellín Cartel. Lara had campaigned against the cartel's activities, and his murder marked a change in Colombian politics. President Belisario Betancur, who had previously opposed extraditing any Colombian drug lords to the United States, announced that he was now willing to extradite. Lehder was a leading individual on the crackdown list.

Other major Medellín Cartel associates fled to the protection of Manuel Noriega in Panama, but when Pablo Escobar discovered Noriega was plotting to betray him to the U.S. in return for amnesty, the cartel associates then fled to Nicaragua to seek the assistance of Nicaraguan president Daniel Ortega. Escobar had paid some of Noriega's closest colonels to inform him of Noriega's intentions.

Lehder's downfall was assisted by his blatant bribing of Bahamian officials, and the attention the activities on Norman's Cay were attracting.

=== Fugitive, capture, trial, and whereabouts ===
After Brian Ross's September 5, 1983 report, on the U.S. television network NBC, made public the corruption of Bahamian government leaders, Lehder could not return to Norman's Cay. The government had frozen all his bank accounts and taken over his property and possessions, and he went from being a billionaire to nearly bankrupt. While on the run in the jungle, he got sick with a fever. Escobar sent a helicopter for Lehder and brought him back to Medellín, where he received medical attention to save his life. Even so, he was left very weak. When Lehder recovered, Escobar hired him as a bodyguard.

Eventually, Lehder wanted to rebuild his fortune, but he was captured at a farm he had just established in Colombia, when a new employee of his informed the police of his location. Another hypothesis supported by Jhon Jairo Velásquez, better known as "Popeye", the head assassin of Pablo Escobar, is that fellow members of the Medellín Cartel wanted him out of the picture due to his radical military-like behavior, which they believed would jeopardize their cocaine empire, and so Escobar himself provided Lehder's whereabouts to the police, leading to Lehder's capture.

Having captured one of the Cartel's most powerful members, the U.S. government used him as a source of information about the details of the Cartel's secret empire, which later proved useful in assisting the Colombian government to dismantle the Cartel. In 1987, Lehder was extradited to Jacksonville, Florida. He was kept in a holding cell in the federal courthouse, watched by armed officers all hours of the day. In 1988, he was convicted and sentenced to life without parole, plus an additional 135 years. Now all of the other leaders knew what would happen if they too were extradited; soon afterward, the Medellín Cartel began to fracture into separate organizations.

These smaller organizations were left vulnerable to the multi pronged preexisting pressures being applied against the Medellin Cartel. A violent war began as the Medellín Cartel leaders tried to protect themselves by fighting back. Escobar's faction, initially both the most powerful and violent, rapidly disintegrated in the face of attacks by the rival Cali Cartel, Colombian police/army, organs of the U.S. government, and vigilante paramilitaries.

In 1992, in exchange for Lehder's agreement to testify against Manuel Noriega, his sentence was reduced to a total of 55 years. Three years after that, Lehder wrote a letter to a federal district judge, complaining that the government had reneged on a deal to transfer him to a German prison. The letter was construed as a threat against the judge.

Within weeks of sending that letter in the fall of 1995, Lehder was whisked away into the night, according to several protected witnesses at the Mesa Unit in Arizona. According to journalist and author Tamara S. Inscoe-Johnson, who worked on the Lehder defense during the time in question, Lehder was simply transferred to another prison and continued to be held in WITSEC, the U.S. Bureau of Prisons' version of the federal Witness Protection Program. Inscoe-Johnson argued that Lehder had not been released, despite Internet rumors to the contrary. Inscoe-Johnson also believed Lehder would never be released: allegedly, he would be privy to secret information regarding the CIA's and his own involvement in the Iran-Contra affair.

On July 22, 2005, he appeared in the U.S. Court of Appeals for the 11th Circuit to contest his sentence. Lehder appeared pro se, arguing that the United States failed to carry out its obligations under a cooperation agreement he had entered into with the United States Attorney's Office, after he held up his end of the deal. (United States v. Lehder-Rivas, 136 Fed. Appx. 324; 2005).

In May 2007, Lehder requested the Supreme Court of Colombia and the Colombian government to intervene in order to comply with the extradition agreement established between Colombia and the US, which stated that a maximum sentence of 30 years would be applied to any extradited Colombian citizen. Lehder argued that, having already served 20 years in prison, which corresponded to two-thirds of the 30-year maximum time stated in the treaty, he had completed his legal sentence and should therefore be released.

In May 2008, Lehder's lawyer declared to El Tiempo that a habeas corpus petition had been filed, alleging that Lehder's cooperation agreement had been violated and that "a court in Washington" had less than 30 days to respond to the notice.

According to his lawyer, Lehder was transferred to a minimum security prison in Florida. He was visited regularly by family members and had access to TV and a computer with only email access. An article published by Cronica Del Quindio in January 2015 reported that Lehder could be released and extradited to Germany at any time.

On June 24, 2015, Lehder wrote a letter to then-President of Colombia Juan Manuel Santos, in which he requested mediation with the United States to be allowed to return to Colombia.

Lehder was released from prison on June 15, 2020, and escorted to Germany by two US officials on a regular passenger flight from New York to Frankfurt and handed over to German authorities. According to declarations made by his daughter, a reason for his release is a relapse of prostate cancer, which had been diagnosed years earlier. A charity in Germany has agreed to pay for treatment. When Lehder flew from Germany to Colombia on 28 March 2025, he was immediately arrested upon arrival at the Bogotá airport. However, he was released on 31 March after a court ruled that his 24-year prison sentence for drug trafficking in Colombia had expired in 2019.

== In popular culture ==
- In the movie Blow (2001), the character Diego Delgado (played by the Spanish actor Jordi Mollà), the cellmate of the main character George Jung at Danbury federal prison, who became Jung's good friend, business partner, and later his nemesis, was based on Carlos Lehder.
- In the 2012 Caracol Televisión series Escobar, el Patrón del Mal (Pablo Escobar: The Boss of Evil), Lehder is portrayed as Marcos Herber (by the Colombian actor and singer Alejandro Martinez).
- Investigation Discovery's Manhunt: Kill or Capture episode, "Colombian Rambo" (August 26, 2015), features the story of Carlos Lehder's rise and fall.
- In the RCN Televisión TV Series (produced by RTI Producciones) Tres Caínes, is portrayed by Julián Beltrán as the character of Marcos Fender.
- In TV series es:Alias el Mexicano is portrayed by Andrés Aramburo.
- In the Netflix original drama/action television mini-series Narcos (2015), which follows drug kingpin Pablo Escobar as well as the ruthless Medellín Cartel, Lehder is portrayed by Juan Riedinger.
- In the 2017 film American Made, he was portrayed by Fredy Yate Escobar.
- In the 2020 DLC for Grand Theft Auto Online: The Cayo Perico Heist, the main antagonist Juan "El Rubio" Strickler is of Colombian-German descent and his drug operation is also based on an island in the Caribbean.

== See also ==
- Cocaine Cowboys
