= Rodrigo Lara Bonilla =

Colombian lawyer and politician (1946-1984)

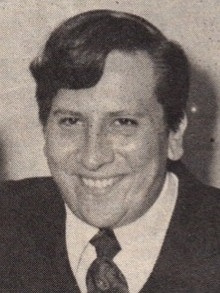

Minister of Justice
- In office 7 August 1983 – 30 April 1984
- President: Belisario Betancur Cuartas
- Preceded by: Bernardo Gaitán Mahecha
- Succeeded by: Enrique Parejo González

Personal details
- Born: Rodrigo Lara Bonilla; 11 August 1946 Neiva, Huila, Colombia
- Died: 30 April 1984 (aged 37) Bogotá, D.C., Colombia
- Cause of death: Assassination
- Party: New Liberalism
- Spouse: Nancy Restrepo Acevedo (m. 1974)
- Children: Rodrigo Armando Lara Sánchez; Rodrigo Lara Restrepo; Jorge Andrés Lara Restrepo; Paulo José Lara Restrepo
- Education: Universidad Externado de Colombia
- Profession: Lawyer

Rodrigo Lara Bonilla (11 August 1946 – 30 April 1984) was a Colombian lawyer and politician, who served as Minister of Justice under President Belisario Betancur, and was assassinated on the orders of drug lord Pablo Escobar because of his work as minister in prosecuting cocaine traffickers mainly belonging to the Medellín Cartel.

Lara's death led to Escobar's indictment for murder, which was the beginning of his eventual downfall.

== Beginnings ==
Born in Neiva, capital of the department of Huila, Lara studied law at the Universidad Externado de Colombia. Years later he joined the Liberal Revolutionary Movement party, founded and led by former Liberal president Alfonso López Michelsen. In 1969, when he was only 23 years old, Lara was appointed mayor of his hometown.

== Minister of Justice ==
“Colombia must know the reality of certain captains who believed that the patrimonial amnesty meant the oblivion of the crimes that their holders committed to achieve their fantastic tortures, they are wrong, and it is not with certificates of good conduct obtained fraudulently or thanks to impunity, that they will be able to hide their criminal past and present before a morally worthy and respectable country”

— Rodrigo Lara Bonilla.

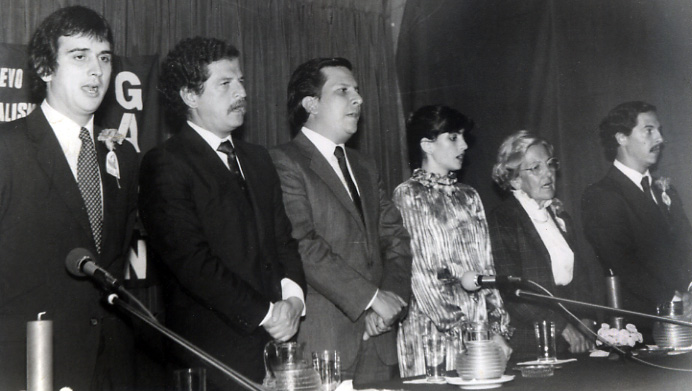
Members of New Liberalism, c. 1979. From left: Iván Marulanda, Luis Carlos Galán, Rodrigo Lara, Nancy Restrepo de Lara, Gabriela White de Vélez, and Hernán Vieira. Galán, Lara, and White were assassinated either by drug lords or by the Revolutionary Armed Forces of Colombia, (FARC)

In August 1983, Lara, who belonged to the New Liberalism created by him and Luis Carlos Galán, was appointed by President Belisario Betancur as Minister of Justice, replacing Bernardo Gaitán Mahecha. Lara, together with Galán, publicly denounced the drug cartels, especially in Medellín, where the cartel was led by Escobar. When Escobar was elected to Congress, Lara denounced him, citing his connection to drug cartels. Lara also exposed Escobar and the cartel for influencing politics and sports through corruption. This triggered a trap set by some politicians, drug dealers, and journalists who were threatened by the explosive growth of Lara in government and especially in the fight against drug trafficking. Jairo Ortega, Escobar's ally in Congress, presented a check (eventually shown to have been falsified) to the chamber, supposedly drawn by known drug trafficker Evaristo Porras.

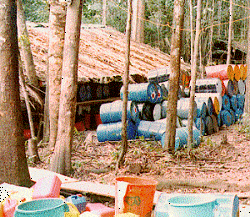
Tranquilandia was the main cocaine production center of the Medellín Cartel, located in the department of Caquetá. It had 19 processing laboratories, abundant fresh water (from the Yarí River), an independent electrical system, dormitories and a landing strip. The complex was destroyed in 1984 by the National Police and the DEA, seizing about 14 tons of drugs, valued at 1.2 billion dollars.

After the alleged link between Lara and the drug cartels was discredited, the government began uncovering the shadowy dealings of the Medellín Cartel, specifically Escobar. Escobar was expelled from Congress and his U.S. visa cancelled. The Minister went further, reviving criminal charges against Escobar and other drug lords, such as Carlos Lehder. Lara also ordered the seizure of 250 of Escobar's planes, while Congress was debating the approval of the extradition. He also relied on Colonel Jaime Ramírez to uncover the complex coca laboratories of Tranquilandia and Villacoca, located in the jungles of southern Colombia, a fact that was made public on 28 March 1984.

== Death ==
Lara's car in the aftermath of the murder

Both Lara and his family were the target of constant death threats. The American ambassador Lewis Arthur Tambs had offered him a bulletproof vest and an armored car, but Lara refused the car. Knowing of the threats, Betancur considered appointing Lara ambassador to Czechoslovakia, a position that Lara accepted and would have taken up on 12 May 1984. On 30 April 1984, Rodrigo Lara Bonilla was in his 1976 Mercedes-Benz W123, on 127th Street north of Bogotá after passing through the Autopista Norte towards the Recreo de los Frailes neighborhood where he lived with his family, when Byron Velásquez and Iván Dario Guisado drove past his SUV convoy on a Yamaha motorcycle. Guisado shot a Mac-10 (.45 ACP caliber) through the window, hitting him multiple times.

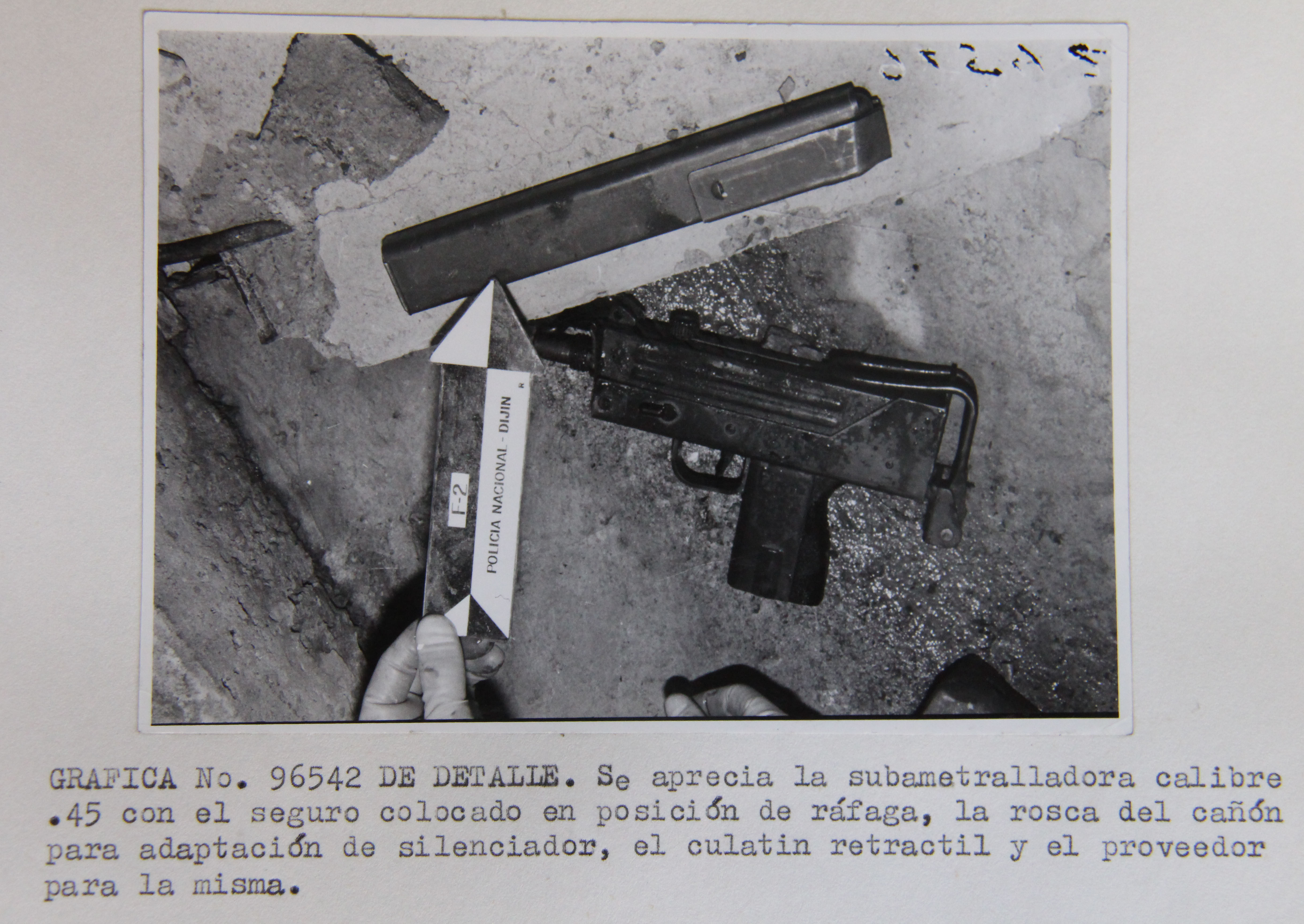
Mac-10 submachine gun used to kill Rodrigo Lara

Lara was killed instantly, but the driver was left unharmed. Lara was transferred to another car and taken to the Shaio Clinic where he was declared dead minutes after his arrival. His bodyguards shot and killed Iván Dario Guisado, but Byron Velásquez was arrested and was paroled on 15 October 1995. Within a few days of Lara's assassination, Pablo Escobar and his family fled to Panama. After Lara's death, the Betancur government immediately approved the extradition law and began a war against organized crime. In turn, Enrique Parejo González was appointed Minister of Justice. He directed a harsh attack against drug trafficking, leading to the extradition of three members of the Medellín Cartel to the United States.

In 2009, Rodrigo Lara Restrepo and the sons of the late Luis Carlos Galán announced to the media their forgiveness of Sebastián Marroquín (formerly Juan Pablo Escobar), son of the late Pablo Escobar, who apologized for the damage done to the country in his two decades of narco-terrorism, as told in the documentary film Sins of My Father (2009).

== In popular culture ==
- In the Colombian Caracol TV series Escobar, el Patrón del Mal (2012), Lara is portrayed by the Colombian actor Ernesto Benjumea.
- In the TV series Tres Caínes (2013), Lara is portrayed in a minor role by the Colombian actor Juan Carlos Serrano.
- In the TV series Alias El Mexicano (2013), Lara is portrayed by the Colombian actor Fabio Rubiano.
- In the Netflix TV series Narcos (2015) (Season 1, Episode 3, "The Men of Always"), Lara (played by Mexican actor Adan Canto) is depicted denouncing Escobar and being assassinated.
- In the TV Series En la boca del lobo is referred to as Roberto Lora Pinilla.
