= Cocaine boom =

Increase in the illegal production and trade of cocaine

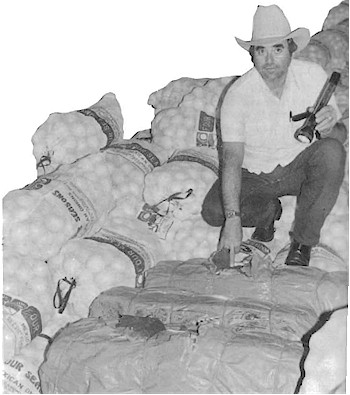
- U.S. Marshals Deputy seizing smuggled cocaine, 1986.
- Date: 1976–1980s
- Type: Economic boom Drug epidemic Crime wave
- Cause: Increase of demand for cocaine

The cocaine boom was a stark increase in the illegal production and trade of the drug cocaine that first began in the mid to late 1970s before then peaking during the 1980s. The boom was the result of organized smugglers who imported cocaine from Latin America to the United States, and a rising demand in cocaine due to cultural trends in the United States. Smuggling rings of Cuban exiles organized trade networks from Latin America to Miami that streamlined the import of cocaine to the United States. Americans also began favoring less of the drugs popular in the 60s counterculture such as marijuana and LSD, and instead began to prefer cocaine due to a mystique of prestige that was developing around it. This increase in cocaine trade fueled the rise of the crack epidemic and government sponsored anti-drug campaigns.

== Origins ==
=== Cuban exile smugglers ===
After the Cuban Revolution and the failed Bay of Pigs Invasion, Cubans who opposed the Castro government began to flee Cuba for the United States. Some of these Cuban exiles were CIA-trained anti-communist guerrillas, and others were former associates of the American Mafia in Cuba. These criminal and anti-communist elements would resettle in Miami. In the early 1960s Cuban criminals in Miami formed La Compania, a smuggling ring dedicated to importing heroin, cocaine and marijuana, then using the profits to fund anti-communist operations outside the United States. Many of these Cuban smugglers would often retire from their original political intentions and focus purely on the profitable cocaine market in the United States. These smuggling groups were often further populated by the continuing exodus of Cubans in the Freedom Flights and Mariel boatlift, as well as the CIA training given to many of the original smugglers.

Demand for cocaine by La Compania was met by Colombian coca growers who were pushed to organize their operations due to the growing demand. By 1968 anti-drug agents in the United States reported that all cocaine discovered entering the United States was coming via Hispanic networks. By the 1970s Colombian cartels began to eclipse Cuban smuggling networks in the United States and began to control all growing operations in Latin America.

=== Colombian smugglers ===
In the early 1960s Cuban exiles dominated the cocaine black market in the United States. Eventually Colombian coca growers would organize and outperform Cuban exile smugglers. This rise in Colombia's importance in the global cocaine trade is the result of many factors. Cuban exile smugglers would often teach and nurture Colombian smugglers to better their trade. Colombia also overtook Chile as the world's top coca producing country after the 1973 Chilean coup d'état and following crackdown on the cocaine trade that forced many smugglers to relocate to Colombia. The social atmosphere in Colombia was also ripe for smuggling as the country had for years been a hotbed for smuggling coffee and emeralds and wealthy families often were involved in alcohol and cigarette bootlegging.

=== Drug culture ===
By the 1970s drugs associated with the 1960s counterculture such as LSD were losing their popular appeal as official LSD research was being halted and some LSD users were moving towards spiritual alternatives to gain the expanded consciousness they once received from LSD. Cocaine was becoming a much glamorized drug in American culture. Films such as Annie Hall and Superfly featured it, Oliver Stone described a Hollywood with heavy cocaine use by actors, and Eric Clapton and the Grateful Dead recorded songs about cocaine. Throughout the 1970s cocaine sales increased sevenfold and began to outsell heroin for the first time.

Cocaine in general was seen by the 1970s as a drug of the elite for its old legacy of rarity and high cost. In 1974, The New York Times Magazine ran an article deeming cocaine the "champagne of drugs". The drug was also seen as having a low potential for abuse and not commonly addictive.

== Developments ==
=== Colombian cartels ===
In 1975, Pablo Escobar started developing his cocaine operation. He flew a plane himself several times, mainly between Colombia and Panama, in order to smuggle a load into the United States. When he later bought fifteen bigger airplanes (including a Learjet) and six helicopters, he decommissioned the original plane and hung it above the gate of his ranch at Hacienda Napoles. In May 1976, Escobar and several of his men were arrested and found in possession of 39 pounds (18 kg) of white paste after returning to Medellín with a heavy load from Ecuador. Initially, Escobar tried to bribe the Medellín judges who were forming the case against him. After many months, the case was dropped. This was the beginning of his dealing with the authorities, using bribery or other means to achieve his goals.

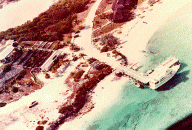
Norman's Cay in 1981 at the height of the operations

Soon, the demand for cocaine was skyrocketing in the United States and Escobar organized more smuggling shipments, routes, and distribution networks in South Florida, California, and other parts of the United States. The Medellín Cartel's massive wealth and power enabled them from the outset to bribe government and legal officials, and buy sophisticated weaponry for their protection. Escobar and Carlos Lehder worked together to develop a new island trans-shipment point in the Bahamas, called Norman's Cay. Lehder and Robert Vesco purchased most of the land on the island which included a 3,300 feet (1,000 m) airstrip, a harbor, hotel, houses, boats, aircraft; he even built a refrigerated warehouse to store the cocaine. From 1978 until 1982, the Cay was the Caribbean's main drug smuggling hub for the Medellín Cartel, as well as a tropical hideaway and playground for Lehder and associates. They flew cocaine in from Colombia by jet and then reloaded it into small aircraft. They then distributed it to locations in Georgia, Florida, and the Carolinas. Escobar was able to purchase the 7.7 square miles (20 km^{2}) of land, which included Hacienda Napoles, for several million dollars. He created a zoo, a lake and other diversions for his family and organization. At one point, it was estimated that 70 to 80 tons of cocaine were being shipped from Colombia to the United States every month.

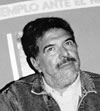
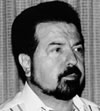
Cali Cartel leaders: José Santacruz Londoño (left) and Gilberto Rodriguez Orejuela

César Gaviria Trujillo, the president of Colombia, cited Escobar and the Medellín Cartel as "the worst of two evils", the other being rivals, the Cali Cartel. He began gearing up much of the government resources into cracking down on the Medellín Cartel. José Santacruz Londoño, Gilberto Rodríguez Orejuela, and Miguel Rodríguez Orejuela were key figures in the Cali Cartel in the 1970s. They were primarily involved in marijuana trafficking, but in the 1980s they branched out into cocaine trafficking. For a time, the Cali Cartel eventually grew big enough to supply 70% of the United States cocaine demands through Jorge Alberto Rodriguez, who oversaw all major shipments entering the United States and were able to meet 90% of the European cocaine market. The Cali Cartel was less violent than its rival, the Medellín Cartel, more inclined toward bribery rather than violence. While the Medellín Cartel was involved in a brutal campaign of violence against the Colombian government, the Cali Cartel grew in power, reaching its peak in the early to mid-1990s when they controlled some 80% of the world's cocaine supply and earned an estimated $8 billion a year. The Rodriguez-Orejuela family alone amassed a fortune of more than $250 billion in worldwide assets, according to the DEA.

Santacruz Londoño's cocaine distribution and money laundering operations were based in the New York metropolitan area, but he and the Cali cartel operated in most of the major cities of the United States including New York City, Miami, Los Angeles, San Francisco, Houston, Las Vegas, and Chicago. In 1992, the DEA seized two of Santacruz Londoño's cocaine conversion laboratories in Brooklyn. After the demise of the Medellín Cartel, the Colombian authorities turned their attention to the Cali Cartel. The campaign began in the summer of 1995, leading to the arrest of several Cali leaders; Gilberto Rodríguez Orejuela was arrested on 9 June. Miguel Rodriguez Orejuela was arrested on 6 August. Santacruz Londoño was arrested on 4 July 1995. Londoño escaped La Picota Prison in Bogotá on 11 January 1996. The police tracked him down to Medellín on 5 March 1996. He was killed while attempting to flee.

In 1996, the Medellín and Cali cartels were estimated to control 75–80% of the Andean region's cocaine traffic, and a similar percentage of the U.S. cocaine market, earning $6–8 billion a year. U.S. law enforcement officials in the 1990s estimated that Colombian drug cartels spent more than $500 million on bribing officials every year. Several political leaders, such as President Virgilio Barco Vargas, became convinced that the ruthless drug lords were intent on becoming so powerful that they could oust the formal government and run the country. Hundreds of government officials, judges and policemen who failed to accept bribes were assassinated under the orders of the barons.

=== Crack epidemic ===
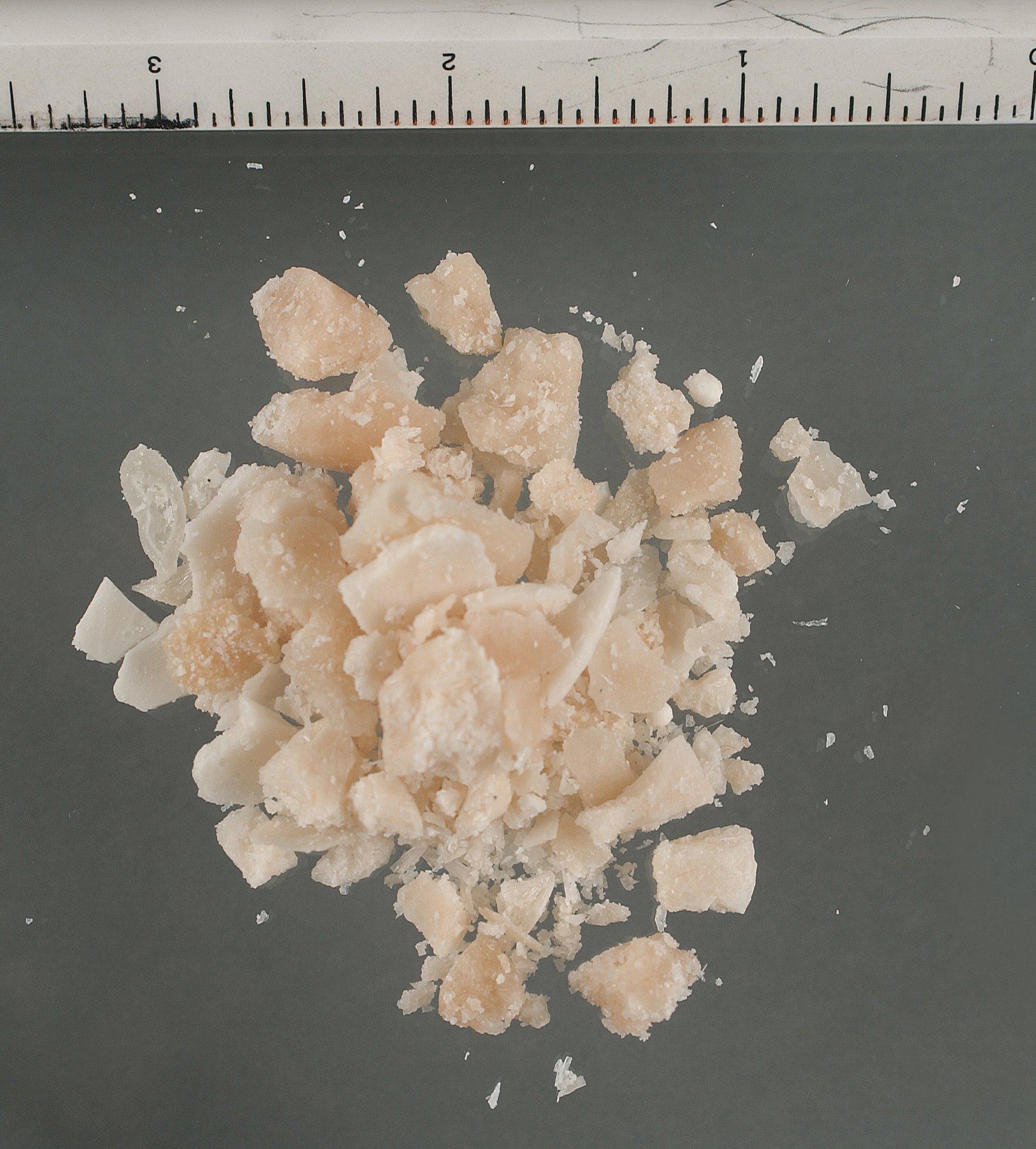
"Rocks" of crack cocaine, with a ruler (marked in inches) for reference

The name "crack" first appeared in the New York Times on November 17, 1985. Within a year more than a thousand press stories had been released about the drug. In the early 1980s, the majority of cocaine being shipped to the United States was landing in Miami, and originated in Colombia, trafficked through the Bahamas and Dominican Republic. Soon there was a huge glut of cocaine powder in these islands, which caused the price to drop by as much as 80 percent.

Faced with dropping prices for their illegal product, drug dealers made a decision to convert the powder to "crack", a solid smokeable form of cocaine, that could be sold in smaller quantities, to more people. It was cheap, simple to produce, ready to use, and highly profitable for dealers to develop. As early as 1981, reports of crack were appearing in Los Angeles, Oakland, San Diego, Miami, Houston, New York, and in the Caribbean.

Initially, crack had higher purity than street powder. Around 1984, powder cocaine was available on the street at an average of 55 percent purity for $100 per gram (equivalent to $310 in 2025), and crack was sold at average purity levels of 80-plus percent for the same price. In some major cities, such as New York, Chicago, Los Angeles, San Francisco, Philadelphia, Baltimore, Houston and Detroit, one dose of crack could be obtained for as little as $2.50 (equivalent to $8 in 2025).

According to the 1985–1986 National Narcotics Intelligence Consumers Committee Report, crack was available in Atlanta, Boston, Detroit, Kansas City, Miami, New York City, Newark, San Francisco, Seattle, St. Louis, Dallas, Denver, Minneapolis and Phoenix.

In 1985, cocaine-related hospital emergencies rose by 12 percent, from 23,500 to 26,300. In 1986, these incidents increased 110 percent, from 26,300 to 55,200. Between 1984 and 1987, cocaine incidents increased to 94,000. By 1987, crack was reported to be available in the District of Columbia and all but four states in the United States.

Some scholars have cited the crack "epidemic" as an example of a moral panic, noting that the explosion in use and trafficking of the drug actually occurred after the media coverage of the drug as an "epidemic".

Later, the epidemic died down, as a new generation avoided the drug after seeing its effects on the previous generation.

== See also ==
- History of lysergic acid diethylamide
