= Fernando Botero Zea =

Mexican and Colombian politician (born 1956)

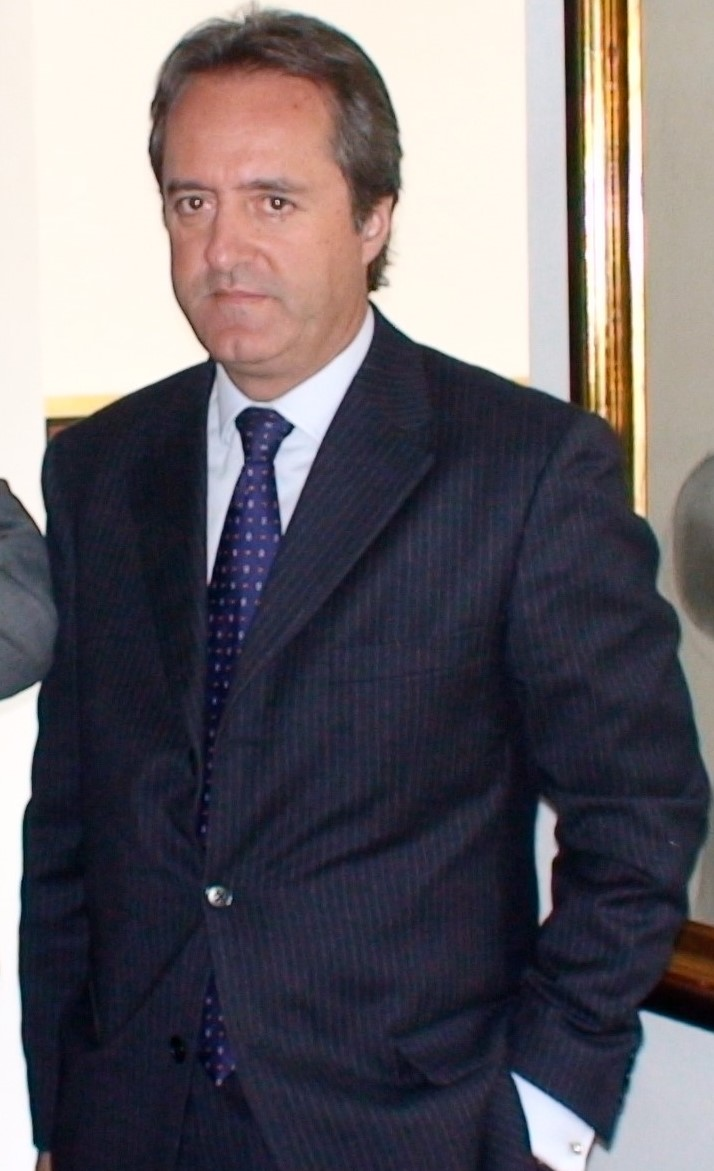
- Botero in 2007

Minister of National Defense of Colombia
- In office 7 August 1994 – 2 August 1995
- President: Ernesto Samper Pizano
- Preceded by: Rafael Pardo Rueda
- Succeeded by: Juan Carlos Esguerra Portocarrero

Personal details
- Born: 23 August 1956 (age 70) Mexico City, Mexico
- Party: Liberal
- Spouse: María Inés Londoño Reyes
- Children: 3
- Parent(s): Fernando Botero Angulo; Gloria Zea
- Education: University of the Andes (BA)
- Profession: Political scientist

Fernando Botero Zea (born August 23, 1956) is a Mexican and Colombian businessman and liberal politician, mainly known for having served as Minister of National Defense of Colombia and also for being the son of Colombian painter and sculptor Fernando Botero and cultural promoter Gloria Zea.

== Biography ==
=== Childhood ===
Born in Mexico City, Fernando Botero Zea is the first son of artist Fernando Botero and the cultural promoter and director for 46 years of the Museum of Modern Art of Bogotá Gloria Zea, who also served as Minister of Culture of Colombia from 1974 to 1982.

Fernando Botero Zea's parents divorced in 1960, just five years after their marriage. Botero Zea has a sister named Lina, who is an art curator and interior designer, and a brother named Juan Carlos, who is a writer.

=== Education ===
When Botero was just four years old, his family moved to New York, taking advantage of the fact that his maternal grandfather, German Zea Hernandez, had been appointed Colombia's Ambassador to the United Nations.

In New York, from 1960 to 1967, Botero studied at the Trent School and then at Trinity School. From 1967 to 1969, Botero boarded at the Fessenden School in Boston, Massachusetts. At that school, he was elected president of his class, awakening his early interest in politics.

In 1973, Botero's mother Gloria Zea and her then husband Andrés Uribe Campuzano were kidnapped. The couple was released after paying ransom and being held in captivity for several weeks. But due to the risk of the kidnapping of other members of the family, they decided to leave the country.

Faced with this new and unexpected family and security situation, Botero Zea entered the Ecole Nouvelle de la Suisse Romande in 1973, where he graduated in 1974 with an International Baccalaureate.

At the university stage Fernando Botero Zea began his process of academic formation. He first studied in Paris, France. There he obtained, in 1975, a Certificat d'Études Politiques (Certificate of Political Studies) at the Institut d'Études Politiques de Paris. Returning to Colombia in 1975, he graduated from the Universidad de los Andes (Colombia) with a degree in Economics and Political Science in 1980.

In 1980, he began a joint program between the Business School and the School of Government at Harvard University. There he earned two master's degrees: Master of Business Administration from Harvard Business School and Master of Public Finance from the John F. Kennedy School of Government in 1983.

Years later - and after his time in Colombia's politics - he returned to his passion for study. Thus, it was that in 1999 he completed a master's degree in journalism from City University London. Botero's thesis was entitled "The Colombian Community in the UK: Myths and Realities". In his thesis, Botero Zea documents the particularity that nearly 80% of Colombian migrants living in the UK come from the municipality of Sevilla, Valle del Cauca and the surrounding municipalities in that corner of southwestern Colombia, working in their country of destination in legal jobs.

In 2016, he completed a master's degree in the Science of Happiness at the Universidad Tec Milenio, part of the Monterrey Institute of Technology and Higher Education.

== Early activity in the private sector ==
=== Stock exchange in Bogotá, Colombia ===
In 1984, he returned to Colombia to become president of Compañía de Servicios Bursátiles S.A., one of the brokerage firms that made part of the Bogotá stock exchange. During his tenure, from 1984 to 1988, the company moved from 17th place among the different companies on the Bogotá Stock Exchange to third place.

== Political career ==
=== Local Mayors Coordinator ===
In 1979, Botero Zea occupied the first position in his life as Coordinator of Local Mayors of Bogota, part to the Department of Government of the Bogotá City Hall. The Secretary of Government at the time was Luis Guillermo Sorzano and the Mayor of Bogota, Hernando Durán Dussán. Botero's responsibility was to coordinate the 20 Local Mayors that existed in the capital.

Botero was head of that office for a year, until he made the decision to enter electoral politics, seeking a seat in the Assembly of Cundinamarca Department in the 1980 elections. In that attempt, he was defeated and suffered his first electoral setback.

In 1986, Botero Zea ran for the position of Councilman of Bogotá. Botero Zea was elected but did not serve on the Bogotá City Council because a few days after his election he was appointed Deputy Minister of Government by President Virgilio Barco Vargas.

=== Deputy Minister of Government ===
Botero was appointed Deputy Minister of Government by President Virgilio Barco on August 7, 1986. The Minister of Government at the time was Fernando Cepeda Ulloa. At the head of his post, Botero Zea developed four main functions:

When Cepeda Ulloa resigned as Minister of Government in 1987, Botero Zea continued as Deputy Minister of the new Minister César Gaviria Trujillo, who was elected President of the Republic in 1990.

In 1988, Botero resigned from his position as Deputy Minister of Government to run for election as Councilman of Bogotá, which he achieved in 1988 with a large vote.

=== Candidate for Mayor of Bogotá ===
In 1989, Fernando Botero ran as a candidate for Mayor of Bogotá for the Liberal Party. He participated in a competition campaign with Juan Martín Caicedo Ferrer, who was the eventual winner of the race and later Mayor of the Colombian capital. At the November 1989 Liberal convention that chose the candidate, Botero won 42.3% of the delegates' votes running against Caicedo Ferrer.

=== General Secretary of the Colombian Liberal Party ===
In 1991 Botero Zea was appointed Secretary General of the Liberal Party, under the leadership of former President Alfonso López Michelsen.

During his administration, an important reform of the Liberal Party statutes took place, to make the party more democratic, more modern, more decentralized and more in tune with the party's social sectors.

Botero's administration coincided with the development of the National Constituent Assembly of 1991 and the promulgation of the new Political Constitution of Colombia in the same year. During the deliberations of the Constituent Assembly, Botero Zea presented on several occasions the official position of the Colombian Liberal Party on key issues such as the presidential run-off, political and administrative decentralization, the royalties regime, the national constituency of the Senate and other issues of fundamental importance.

=== Senate of the Republic ===
He was elected Senator of the Republic on two occasions. First, in the 1990 elections; and then again in 1991 after Congress was revoked by the National Constituent Assembly.

In the Senate of the Republic, Botero occupied a place in the Seventh Commission of the Senate. He was President of the committee on several occasions.

=== Minister of National Defense ===
Fernando Botero Zea was appointed Minister of Defense on August 7, 1994.

On the military and strategic front, Botero Zea used both the National Police and the Army in his pursuit of the Cali Cartel. During Botero Zea's tenure, the Cali Cartel's top leaders were all killed or imprisoned, including brothers Gilberto and Miguel Rodríguez Orejuela, Phanor Arizabaleta, Helmer "Pacho" Herrera, and José Santa Cruz Londoño.

On the other hand, Botero Zea developed an aggressive campaign against the guerrillas (but not the cartels), especially the fronts of the Revolutionary Armed Forces of Colombia (FARC) that operated in Magdalena Medio and the departments of Bolívar, Cesar, Córdoba, eastern Antioquia, Urabá, Valle del Cauca, Cauca, Nariño, Putumayo, Huila and Caquetá.

=== The 1994 Political Campaign ===
Shortly after Ernesto Samper's 1994 presidential victory, Samper's opponent and future successor, Andres Pastrana, accused Samper of having received campaign donations from the Cali Cartel in the amount of US$6 million.

Colombian Attorney General Alfonso Valdivieso Sarmiento personally led the investigation. Valdivieso is a cousin of the late Luis Carlos Galán, a charismatic presidential candidate assassinated in 1989 by the Medellín Cartel for his political views. Galán favored the extradition of drug traffickers to the United States for prosecution.

Valdivieso's investigation revealed connections between the Cali cartel and major figures in Colombian society, including politicians, journalists, athletes, and military and police officers, among others.

As a result, numerous politicians and senior members of the government were indicted. Botero was arrested in connection with this investigation and accused of having facilitated the entry of illegal money into the presidential campaign. He was sentenced to 30 months' detention at the Escuela de Caballería, a military base located in northern Bogotá. Upon completion of his sentence, Botero Zea was released on February 12, 1998.

=== Second Trial ===
In 1999, another case was opened against Botero for the alleged embezzlement of more than 800 million Colombian pesos destined for the same 1994 presidential campaign. The accusation was brought by the then Attorney General Alfonso Gómez Méndez, appointed by President Samper.

In 2002, Judge 37 of the Colombian capital assessed the prosecution's accusation, conducted an exhaustive investigation of Botero Zea's bank accounts and financial movements, and finally declared him innocent of the crimes of which he was accused. A few weeks later, in 2003, the Bogotá Superior Court, subject to political pressure from Samper and his allies, overturned the sentence of Bogotá's 37th Criminal Court.

In January 2007, the Supreme Court of Justice reaffirmed the ruling by the Superior Court of Bogota.

In a televised interview for Canal RCN on Tuesday, February 13, 2007, Botero presented proof of his innocence, including the deed to a property that Botero's family had sold at the time of the events, and denounced the political persecution that was allegedly the cause of the adverse rulings of justice and offered previously unknown details.

In 2009, due to the accumulation of sentences decreed by the Superior Court of Bogotá in the last instance, Botero Zea obtained the benefit of freedom and the end of his criminal proceedings. Since then, he has dedicated his personal and professional time between Mexico and Colombia.

== Entrepreneurship at maturity ==
=== Grupo Editorial Estilo Mexico ===
Botero Zea founded Grupo Editorial Estilo México in 2002. This publishing group published during its existence an important number of magazines, among them Estilo México, Be, Espacio Corporativo, Destinos, Sabores, Estilo (Los Cabos, Acapulco, Riviera Maya, San Miguel de Allende, Aeromar magazine, Danhos magazine and Peyrelongue magazine, among other titles. Grupo Editorial Estilo México also edited and published the book México desde el Aire.

=== Book Conversaciones en la Cantina ===
In the book Conversaciones en la Cantina, Botero Zea attempts to sketch the history of the 21st century in Mexico based on the testimony of the main protagonists of Mexican political life such as Jorge Castañeda, Felipe Calderón, Vicente Fox, Carlos Salinas de Gortari, Cuauhtémoc Cárdenas, among many others; as well as the vision of leading observers and analysts of Mexican political life and history such as Héctor Aguilar Camín, Carmen Aristegui, Germán Dehesa, Denise Dresser, Carlos Loret de Mola, Andrés Oppenheimer, among others.

The book became a success, which prompted a second and then a third edition, and the inclusion of the book in the curriculum of some universities in Mexico City.

=== Book México desde el cielo ===
The book México desde el cielo was made by Botero Zea in collaboration with Alejandro González, Ágata Lanz and Kike Arnal. The book is centered on the best air photographs of Mexico's landscapes and its most outstanding cultural sites. The book was acquired in its first edition, by the governments of the states of Quintana Roo, Jalisco, State of Mexico, Baja California Sur, among others.

=== Botero in China ===
In 2014, Botero Zea picked up the cultural and artistic legacy of his family and decided to create Botero-in-China, the company in charge of organizing the first exhibition of Master Fernando Botero in China. The exhibition included his father's major work and was presented in Beijing, Shanghai and Hong Kong. The Botero- in-China exhibitions attracted more than 1.5 million visitors. By 2021, the same company had organized more than 200 educational conferences in 21 different countries worldwide.

Through the company Botero-in-China, Fernando Botero Zea has opened new frontiers for the work of his father Fernando Botero, in China as well as in other Asian countries such as Japan, Singapore, Malaysia, Thailand and the Philippines.

In the midst of the COVID-19 pandemic, Botero Zea also began opening spaces for his father's work in the Middle East, in countries such as the United Arab Emirates, Saudi Arabia, Qatar, Jordan, Israel and Kuwait. He also plans to extend his father's work in the medium term to India, a promising art market in the future.

In 2025, Botero Zea's participation in the Sotheby's “Origins” auction in Diriyah, Saudi Arabia attracted significant attention. Two key works were featured: the painting “Society Woman”, sold for over $1 million to a local collector, and the bronze sculpture “Man on Horse,” which failed to sell. The event blended high-profile art, luxury items, and sports memorabilia, with panel discussions on the Botero legacy and contemporary collecting trends, featuring Botero Zea as a panelist.

Colombian media responded with skepticism and humor, querying the auction’s high prices, relevance in the local market, and the authenticity of the bids. Several reporters mocked the spectacle and scrutinized the event’s motivations. The controversy added to broader discussions about the ongoing structuring of the Botero estate, noting it remains under formal development, and about the blurred lines between estate management, secondary market activities, and personal investments by Botero Zea and other parties.

=== The Estate of Fernando Botero & The Fernando Botero Foundation ===
Since the death of his father (2023), the artist Fernando Botero, Fernando Botero Zea has been at the head of The Estate of Fernando Botero as Co-President. In addition, Fernando Botero Zea is a member of the Board of Directors of The Fernando Botero Foundation (in the process of legal creation) which aims to preserve and expand the artistic legacy of the Master Fernando Botero through the organization of exhibitions in multiple venues around the world, the creation of a catalogue raisonné of his work, the publication of books, academic studies on the artist's painting and sculpture and other related activities.

Various claims emerged that Fernando Botero Zea is fully dedicated to managing global exhibitions of his father's works, the Botero estate is still in the process of formal organization, meaning it is not yet entirely established. Botero Zea has meanwhile actively participated in secondary art market operations, activities which sometimes obscure the boundaries between the estate’s formal business, personal investment, and external investor interests.

== Activity in education ==
=== University professor and teaching experience ===
Fernando Botero Zea started his teaching experience in the Faculty of Business Administration at the Universidad de los Andes. In that faculty, he taught Introduction to Finance from 1984 to 1994. Since 1985, Botero Zea extended his teaching activities to the Faculty of Economics at the Universidad de los Andes. In that faculty, he taught Macroeconomic Policy from 1985 to 1994. Between 1989 and 1994, he taught Finance and International Relations at the School of Economics of the Universidad Externado de Colombia.

He continued to teach in Mexico after he had fled Colombia in 1999, and taught from 1999 to 2003 Macroeconomic Policy at the School of Economics at the Universidad Iberoamericana and the same at the Universidad de la Américas, both in Mexico City.

=== Landmark Education ===
In 2001, shortly after taking up residence in Mexico, Botero Zea created Landmark Education of Mexico, focused on human potential courses. This company has also seen its expansion in Colombia since 2005.

Botero was the founder and principal architect of Landmark Education's expansion in Latin America, where it has three main epicenters: Mexico City, Bogotá in Colombia and São Paulo in Brazil.

In the framework of Landmark Education, Botero Zea has taught seminars and various courses from 2002 to 2014 on topics such as money management, human potential, relationships and business development.

Landmark Education (now Landmark Worldwide) has been associated with various controversies internationally, including allegations of aggressive recruitment practices, psychological pressure during seminars, and numerous lawsuits against media outlets and critics who have described its methods as coercive or cult-like. Despite these controversies, Landmark maintains that its programs are beneficial and notes the ongoing participation of individuals from many countries.

== Family life ==
Botero Zea married María Elvira Quintana in 1988. They had two sons: Fernando Botero Quintana and Felipe Botero Quintana. Botero also has a daughter, Camila Botero Llano, born from a previous relationship. In 1999, Botero married María Inés Londoño Reyes.

== Popular culture ==
- In the 2013 TV series Tres Caínes, Botero was fictionalized as the character of Alberto Otero, played by the Colombian actor Juan Carlos Messier.
- In the 2014 TV Series En la boca del lobo, Botero is portrayed by the Belgian-Colombian actor Didier van der Hove as the character of Alejandro Otero.
- In the third season of Narcos (2017), former minister Botero Zea is depicted by Colombian actor Luis Mesa.

== See also ==
- Ministry of National Defense (Colombia)
- Colombian Liberal Party
- Ernesto Samper
- Botero Museum. Located in Bogotá, Colombia
- Botero. Italian surname
