= Proceso 8000 =

1990s Colombian political scandal involving Cali Cartel campaign financing

The ‘Proceso 8000’ (lit. ‘‘Process 8000’’) was a major political scandal and a series of judicial and political investigations in Colombia during the 1990s concerning the financing of electoral campaigns with money from drug trafficking, primarily the Cali Cartel. The investigations established that funds from the cartel had entered the 1994 presidential campaign of Ernesto Samper, the Colombian Liberal Party candidate who was elected President of Colombia that year. Cali Cartel leaders Gilberto and Miguel Rodríguez Orejuela later acknowledged providing money to the campaign. The investigations extended beyond the presidential campaign and involved members of Congress, political figures, senior public officials and members of Samper’s campaign, several of whom were prosecuted and convicted.

Among the convicted members of the campaign were treasurer Santiago Medina and campaign director and later Minister of Defense Fernando Botero Zea. Medina was sentenced to 64 months in prison for illicit enrichment after the court found that he had received funds from the Rodríguez Orejuela brothers for the benefit of the Samper campaign. Botero was subsequently sentenced to 63 months in prison after accepting charges of illicit enrichment on behalf of third parties and falsification of a private document.

Whether Samper personally knew about the illicit origin of the funds became one of the central issues of the scandal. Samper consistently denied such knowledge, while Medina and Botero made statements attributing knowledge of the financing to him. In February 1996, Attorney General Alfonso Valdivieso filed a criminal complaint against Samper with the Investigation and Accusation Commission of the Chamber of Representatives on allegations including illicit enrichment, electoral fraud, falsification of documents and concealment. On 12 June 1996, the Chamber of Representatives of Colombia voted to close the proceedings against Samper, preventing the case from proceeding to a trial before the Senate.

The scandal triggered a prolonged political and institutional crisis during Samper’s presidency and severely strained relations between Colombia and the United States. In March 1996, the administration of U.S. President Bill Clinton declined to certify Colombia as fully cooperating in international counter-narcotics efforts, restricting its eligibility for most U.S. foreign assistance and U.S. support for international loans. In July, the United States revoked Samper’s visa, citing what U.S. officials described as evidence of his links to drug traffickers.

The name “Proceso 8000” originated from the number assigned to one of the case files handled by the Colombian Attorney General’s Office concerning links between political figures and the Cali Cartel. The designation subsequently came to be used more broadly for the investigations and the resulting political scandal.

== Background and early investigation ==
In June 1994, shortly before the second round of the 1994 Colombian presidential election, Conservative candidate Andrés Pastrana obtained a series of tape recordings containing conversations involving members of the Cali Cartel and references to contributions to political campaigns. Pastrana delivered the recordings, which became known as the ‘‘narcocassettes’’, to President César Gaviria, who in turn referred them to Attorney General Gustavo de Greiff. After the recordings became public, the Attorney General’s Office opened an investigation into allegations that drug-trafficking money had entered the presidential campaigns.

On 16 August 1994, de Greiff announced that the investigation had found insufficient evidence to establish that drug-trafficking money had entered either Samper’s or Pastrana’s presidential campaign. The investigation arising from the narcocassettes was subsequently closed. By then, the Supreme Court of Justice had elected Alfonso Valdivieso to succeed de Greiff as attorney general, and Valdivieso took office on 18 August 1994.

Under Valdivieso, the Attorney General’s Office pursued broader investigations into the Cali Cartel’s financial and political networks. Investigators examined documents, financial records and other evidence that linked political figures and public officials to payments from the cartel. By June 1995, Valdivieso’s office had opened investigations involving several prominent figures and had sent evidence concerning members of Congress to the Supreme Court, which had jurisdiction over their conduct.

The investigations increasingly focused on the relationship between Cali Cartel money and political campaigns. Evidence collected during raids against the cartel—including documents, computer disks, checks and receipts—was turned over to Valdivieso’s office and contributed to investigations involving politicians, members of Congress and other public figures.

== Expansion of the scandal ==
The investigation escalated in July 1995 with the arrest of Santiago Medina, treasurer of Samper’s 1994 presidential campaign. Medina told prosecutors that the campaign had received money from the Cali Cartel and implicated senior campaign officials, including campaign director Fernando Botero Zea. His testimony shifted the focus of the scandal directly toward the financing of Samper’s presidential campaign.

Botero, who had become Minister of Defense after Samper took office, resigned from the cabinet and was subsequently arrested. He initially maintained that neither he nor Samper had known about the entry of drug-trafficking money into the campaign. In January 1996, however, Botero changed his account and publicly stated that Samper had known about and approved the financing. Samper rejected the accusation and continued to deny knowledge of illicit contributions.

The scandal widened further as investigators examined financial records and testimony concerning payments by the Cali Cartel to politicians and public officials. Gilberto and Miguel Rodríguez Orejuela, the cartel’s principal leaders, acknowledged in January 1996 that they had provided money to Samper’s campaign, while disputing aspects of the amounts and circumstances described by former campaign officials. Evidence concerning cartel payments also led to investigations of members of the Colombian Congress and other political figures.

The investigations resulted in criminal convictions of senior members of the presidential campaign. In July 1996, Medina was sentenced to 64 months in prison for illicit enrichment. The judgment found that he had received 5 billion Colombian pesos from the Rodríguez Orejuela brothers and transferred the money for the benefit of the Samper campaign. Botero was sentenced later that year to 63 months in prison after accepting charges of illicit enrichment on behalf of third parties and falsification of a private document.

== Proceedings against Samper ==
As the investigation into the campaign financing expanded, the question of whether Ernesto Samper had personally known about the illicit contributions became central to the scandal. Samper maintained that he had not known that money from drug traffickers had entered his campaign. Santiago Medina and Fernando Botero Zea, however, gave statements to investigators attributing knowledge of the financing to him.

In February 1996, Attorney General Alfonso Valdivieso formally referred allegations against Samper to the Investigation and Accusation Commission of the Chamber of Representatives of Colombia, the congressional body responsible for investigating the president. Valdivieso alleged possible illicit enrichment, electoral fraud, falsification of documents and concealment, based on evidence gathered during the Proceso 8000 investigations. Samper testified before the commission on 26 March and again denied knowing that the campaign had received money from the Cali Cartel.

The representatives investigating the case reached opposing conclusions. Heyne Mogollón argued that the evidence did not establish Samper’s responsibility and recommended that the proceedings be closed, while Rodrigo Arcila argued that there was sufficient evidence to bring charges against the president. On 23 May 1996, the Investigation and Accusation Commission voted 10–3 against Arcila’s proposal to accuse Samper before the Senate.

The matter then went before the full Chamber of Representatives. On 12 June 1996, the Chamber voted 111–43 to close the proceedings against Samper. The decision ended the congressional case without an accusation being sent to the Senate for trial. Samper remained in office and completed his presidential term in August 1998.

== Relations with the United States ==
The Proceso 8000 contributed to a sharp deterioration in relations between Colombia and the United States. Colombia had been a major U.S. partner in counter-narcotics policy, and relations had remained close even as Colombian authorities pursued the leadership of the Cali Cartel. As allegations concerning the financing of Ernesto Samper’s campaign intensified, however, U.S. officials increasingly questioned both Samper’s credibility and his government’s commitment to combating drug trafficking.

On 1 March 1996, the administration of U.S. President Bill Clinton declined to certify Colombia as fully cooperating with international counter-narcotics efforts. The decision made Colombia ineligible for most forms of U.S. foreign assistance and for U.S. support for loans from international financial institutions. U.S. officials linked the decision not only to Colombia’s broader anti-drug performance but also to concerns surrounding Samper and the influence of drug-trafficking organizations on Colombian political institutions. The Colombian government rejected the decision and argued that its efforts against the Cali Cartel demonstrated its commitment to combating narcotics trafficking.

Relations deteriorated further after the Chamber of Representatives of Colombia closed the proceedings against Samper in June 1996. On 11 July, the United States revoked Samper’s visa. The State Department said that the measure reflected its conclusion that there was substantial evidence that Samper had knowingly assisted drug traffickers; Samper rejected the allegation, and the Colombian government criticized the decision as an affront to the country’s sovereignty and dignity.Tensions continued through the remainder of Samper’s presidency. Washington pressed Colombia to strengthen anti-narcotics legislation and restore the possibility of extraditing Colombian nationals, while Colombian officials resisted the characterization that such measures were being adopted under U.S. pressure. In 1997, the Clinton administration again declined to certify Colombia as fully cooperating in counter-narcotics efforts. The two consecutive decertifications and the revocation of Samper’s visa reflected the deterioration in bilateral relations during his presidency.

== Later developments ==
The controversy over the financing of Samper’s campaign continued after the principal investigations and congressional proceedings had concluded. On 20 July 1998, shortly before leaving office, Samper publicly acknowledged that money from drug traffickers had entered his 1994 presidential campaign. He continued to maintain that the funds had been accepted without his knowledge and attributed responsibility to officials who had managed the campaign.

The Proceso 8000 also had consequences beyond Samper’s presidential campaign. Investigations into the Cali Cartel’s political networks resulted in proceedings against members of Congress and other public officials accused of receiving illicit funds. Several politicians and former senior officials were ultimately convicted in cases connected to the scandal.

The scandal remained a reference point in subsequent debates over the relationship between drug trafficking and political power in Colombia. Later accounts of the period have treated the Proceso 8000 as evidence of the Cali Cartel’s efforts to influence political institutions through campaign contributions and payments to public officials.

== See also ==
- Corruption in Colombia
