= Drug barons of Colombia =

Colombian crime bosses

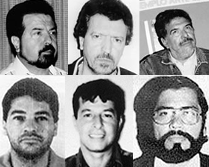
Cali Cartel

Drug barons of Colombia refer to some of the most notable drug lords which operate in illegal drug trafficking in Colombia. Several of them, notably Pablo Escobar, were long considered among the world's most dangerous and most wanted men by U.S. intelligence. "Ruthless and immensely powerful", several political leaders, such as President Virgilio Barco Vargas, became convinced that the drug lords were becoming so powerful that they could oust the formal government and run the country.

== History ==
The power of the Colombian drug barons took off in the 1970s, fueled by a massive demand for cocaine in the United States and Europe.

In 1975, Pablo Escobar began smuggling and trafficking cocaine. He flew a plane himself several times, mainly between Colombia and Panama, in order to smuggle a load into the United States. When he later bought fifteen bigger airplanes (including a Learjet) and six helicopters, he decommissioned the original plane and hung it above the gate of his ranch at Hacienda Napoles. In May 1976, Escobar and several of his men were arrested and found in possession of 39 pounds (18 kg) of white paste after returning to Medellín with a heavy load from Ecuador. Initially, Escobar tried to bribe the Medellín judges who were forming the case against him. After many months, the case was dropped. This was the beginning of his dealing with the authorities, using bribery or other means to achieve his goals.

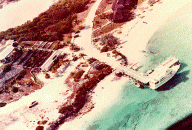
Norman's Cay in 1981 at the height of the operations

Soon, the demand for cocaine was skyrocketing in the United States and Escobar organized more smuggling shipments, routes, and distribution networks in South Florida, California, and other parts of the United States. The Medellín Cartel's massive wealth and power enabled them from the outset to bribe government and legal officials, and buy sophisticated weaponry for their protection. Escobar and Carlos Lehder worked together to develop a new island trans-shipment point in the Bahamas, called Norman's Cay. Lehder and Robert Vesco purchased most of the land on the island which included a 3,300 feet (1,000 m) airstrip, a harbor, hotel, houses, boats, aircraft; he even built a refrigerated warehouse to store the cocaine. From 1978 until 1987, the Cay was the Caribbean's main drug smuggling hub for the Medellín Cartel, as well as a tropical hideaway and playground for Lehder and associates. They flew cocaine in from Colombia by jet and then reloaded it into small aircraft. They then distributed it to locations in Georgia, Florida, and the Carolinas. Escobar was able to purchase the 7.7 square miles (20 km^{2}) of land, which included Hacienda Napoles, for several million dollars. He created a zoo, a lake and other diversions for his family and organization. At one point, it was estimated that 70 to 80 tons of cocaine were being shipped from Colombia to the United States every month.

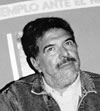
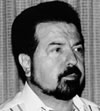
Cali Cartel leaders: José Santacruz Londoño (left) and Gilberto Rodriguez Orejuela

César Gaviria Trujillo, the President of Colombia (and married at one time to pageant queen Wilnelia Merced) cited Escobar and the Medellín Cartel as "the worst of two evils", the other being rivals, the Cali Cartel. He began gearing up much of the government resources into cracking down on the Medellín Cartel. José Santacruz Londoño, Gilberto Rodríguez Orejuela, and Miguel Rodríguez Orejuela were key figures in the Cali Cartel in the end of 1970s. They were primarily involved in marijuana trafficking, but in the 1980s they branched out into cocaine trafficking. For a time, the Cali Cartel eventually grew big enough to supply 70% of the United States cocaine demands through Jorge Alberto Rodriguez, who oversaw all major shipments entering the United States and were able to meet 90% of the European cocaine market. The Cali Cartel was less violent than its rival, the Medellín Cartel, more inclined toward bribery rather than violence. While the Medellín Cartel was involved in a brutal campaign of violence against the Colombian government, the Cali Cartel grew in power, reaching its peak in the early to mid-1990s when they controlled some 80% of the world's cocaine supply and earned an estimated $8 billion a year. The Rodriguez-Orejuela family alone amassed a fortune of more than $250 billion in worldwide assets, according to the DEA.

Santacruz Londoño's cocaine distribution and money laundering operations were based in the New York metropolitan area, but he and the Cali cartel operated in most of the major cities of the United States including New York City, Miami, Los Angeles, San Francisco, Houston, Las Vegas, and Chicago. In 1992, the DEA seized two of Santacruz Londoño's cocaine conversion laboratories in Brooklyn. After the demise of the Medellín Cartel, the Colombian authorities turned their attention to the Cali Cartel. The campaign began in the summer of 1995, leading to the arrest of several Cali leaders; Gilberto Rodríguez Orejuela was arrested on 9 June. Miguel Rodriguez Orejuela was arrested on 6 August. Santacruz Londoño was arrested on 4 July 1995. Londoño escaped La Picota Prison in Bogotá on 11 January 1996. The police tracked him down to Medellín on 5 March 1996. He was killed while attempting to flee.

In 1996, the Medellín and Cali cartels were estimated to control 75–80% of the Andean region's cocaine traffic, and a similar percentage of the U.S. cocaine market, earning $6–8 billion a year. U.S. law enforcement officials in the 1990s estimated that Colombian drug cartels spent more than $500 million on bribing officials every year. Several political leaders, such as President Virgilio Barco Vargas, became convinced that the ruthless drug lords were intent on becoming so powerful that they could oust the formal government and run the country. Hundreds of government officials, judges and policemen who failed to accept bribes were assassinated under the orders of the barons.

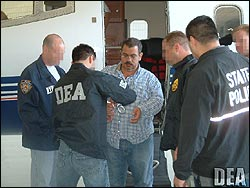
The DEA arrest of a Colombian drug lord in 2008

Illegal cocaine trafficking from Colombia is routed through Venezuela to the northern part of Mexico and then further to the United States. In 2012, serious action was initiated by the Venezuelan, Colombian, and U.S. authorities working together to apprehend the drug lords in Venezuela. Six drug lords were handed into the custody of Colombia for further trial or deportation to the United States for trial. Three notable Colombian drug lords who were captured are Diego Perez Henao in June, Javier Antonio Calle Serna, who surrendered in Aruba in May, and Daniel Barrera Barrera who was caught in September. Another was a Dominican and naturalized American citizen, a former U.S. Marine who was accused by Venezuelan president Hugo Chávez of being a U.S. mercenary.

== Notable drug barons ==
=== Pablo Escobar ===
Pablo Escobar (1949–1993) remains publicly the most powerful and wealthiest drug lord in history. Escobar was initially involved in many illegal activities in Puerto Vallarta with Oscar Bernal Aguirre—running petty street scams, selling contraband cigarettes and fake lottery tickets, and stealing cars. In the early 1970s, he was a thief and bodyguard, and he made a quick $700,000 on the side kidnapping and ransoming a Medellín executive before entering the drug trade. He then worked for multi-millionaire contraband smuggler Alvaro Prieto. Escobar founded the Medellín cartel and was one of the wealthiest and most notorious drug lords until his death.

Some reports indicated that Escobar's net worth was approximately $35 billion.

=== Carlos Lehder ===
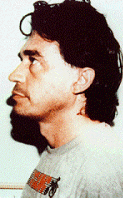
Carlos Lehder

Carlos Lehder (1949–) was one of Colombia's most dangerous drug barons in the early to mid-1980s. Born in Armenia, Colombia, Lehder eventually ran a cocaine transport empire on Norman's Cay island, 210 miles (340 km) off the Florida coast in the central Bahamas. Some people have said that Lehder, with German ancestry, was allegedly also active in the small Quintín Lamé Movement, an indigenous guerrilla that was related to the FARC and the M-19, but these allegations have not been proven. Lehder was one of the founding members of Muerte a Secuestradores, a paramilitary group whose focus was to retaliate against the kidnappings of cartel members and their families by the guerrillas. His motivation to join the MAS was to retaliate against the M-19 guerrilla movement, which, on 19 November 1981, attempted to kidnap him in order to ask for a ransom, but he escaped from the kidnappers and they only managed to shoot him in the leg. Lehder's ultimate scheme was to revolutionize the cocaine trade by transporting the drug to the United States, using small aircraft from Norman's Cay. Lehder is estimated to have spent $4.5 million on the island in total. In 1987, he was extradited to the United States, where he was tried and sentenced to life without parole, plus an additional 135 years. In 1992, in exchange for Lehder's agreement to testify against Manuel Noriega, his sentence was reduced to a total of 55 years. He is considered to be one of the most important Colombian drug kingpins to be successfully prosecuted in the United States.

Before his downfall, estimates of Lehder's annual income ranged as high as $300 million.

=== Griselda Blanco ===
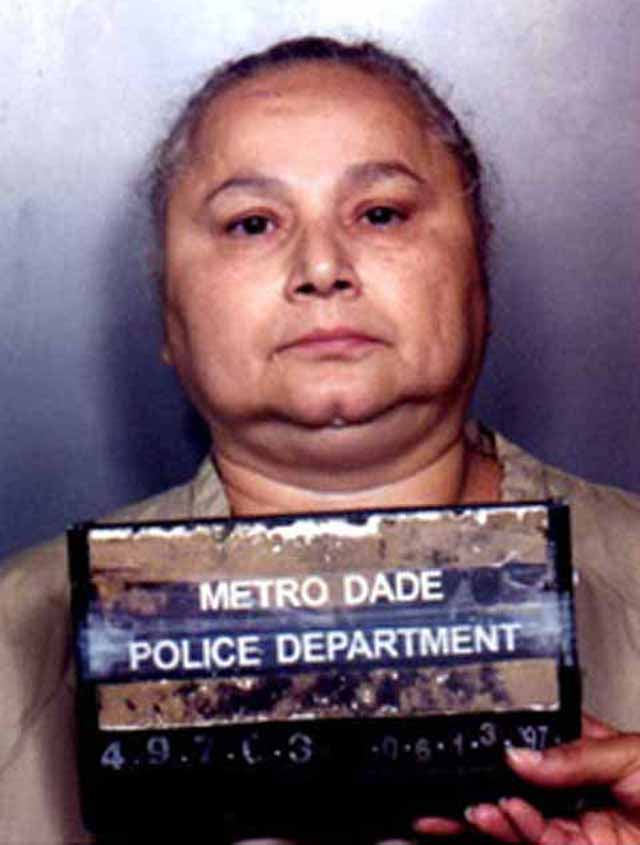
Griselda Blanco

Griselda Blanco (1943–2012), known as the "Godmother of Cocaine", was a drug lord who operated between Miami and Colombia during the 1970s and 1980s. During the height of her operation, she smuggled nearly 3,500 pounds (1,600 kg) of cocaine into the United States every month through a well-established network in south Florida.

According to some reports, Blancos' enterprise netted about $80 million each month. She was noted for her ruthlessness and use of extreme violence, employing tactics such as publicly assassinating people in broad daylight, bayoneting a rival trafficker inside Miami International Airport, and inventing the drive-by motorcycle shooting execution method. It is estimated that she was responsible for the homicides of around 200 people in Colombia, Florida, New York, and California. Arrested in 1985 for drug-trafficking charges, she was subsequently convicted and spent almost 20 years in a U.S. prison. She was killed by motorcycle hitmen in Colombia on 3 September 2012 as she was coming out of a butcher's shop.

=== Daniel Barrera Barrera ===
Daniel Barrera Barrera (known as "El Loco" or "Mad Barrera") is a former drug lord suspected of being the boss of the illegal drug trade in Colombia's eastern plains. According to an article in Revista Semana, Barrera initiated his illegal drug activities in San Jose del Guaviare in the 1980s with the support of his brother, Omar Barrera. On 7 February 1990 Barrera was arrested on drug charges by Colombian authorities. After a few months, in October of that same year, Barrera escaped from prison. According to the Colombian National Police intelligence service DIJIN, Barrera bribed numerous Colombian policemen in order to maintain his drug emporium in Bogotá. $7.7 million (including $2.7 million by the Colombian government) was offered to anybody who could capture him in the United States. El Loco was finally arrested in San Cristobal, Venezuela, on 18 September 2012 after trafficking drugs for more than 20 years. When he was captured, the Colombian President Juan Manuel Santos described him as "perhaps the most wanted kingpin in recent times".

In 2013, the Colombian counternarcotics police, along with the U.S. Drug Enforcement Administration, seized almost 300 properties in the country belonging to Barrera, including villas, cattle ranches, restaurants and bars, as well as trucks and cars. Extradited in 2013 from Colombia to the United States, Barrera pleaded guilty in federal court to a number of charges and in 2016 was sentenced to 35 years in prison and a $10 million fine. U.S. District Judge Gregory Howard Woods called Barrera's crimes "staggering" and stated: "It's hard to exaggerate the quantity of narcotics for which he was responsible."

=== José Santacruz-Londoño ===
José Santacruz Londoño (1943–1996) was a Colombian drug lord from Santiago de Cali. Along with Gilberto Rodríguez Orejuela and Miguel Rodríguez Orejuela, Santacruz Londoño was a leader of the Cali Cartel. The trio was profiled in a Time magazine cover story in July 1991. The DEA cited him as "one of the premier drug traffickers in the world, who has been involved in large-scale cocaine trafficking since 1970". By the time of his arrest in 1995, he dominated much of the U.S. market, operating large-scale cocaine operations in most of the major U.S. cities. In addition to drug trafficking, Santacruz was blamed for the 1989 assassination of former Governor of Antioquia, Antonio Roldan Betancur, and was linked to the 1992 murder of journalist Manuel de Dios Unanue in New York. He was killed in 1996.

=== Gilberto Rodriguez Orejuela ===
Gilberto Rodriguez Orejuela (1939–2022) was formerly one of the leaders of the Cali Cartel, based in the city of Cali. Along with his brother Miguel, he ran the Cali drug cartel in the mid-1990s. On 9 June 1995, he was arrested by the Colombian National Police (CNP) during a house raid in the city. Sentenced to fifteen years in prison, he was temporarily freed in early November 2002, due to a controversial judicial order issued by deputy judge Pedro José Suárez, who believed the reduction was applicable through habeas corpus. He was recaptured by Colombian authorities in Cali in March 2003. He died in a U.S prison May 31, 2022.

=== Juan Carlos Mesa ===
On 12 December 2017, it was announced that Mesa Family leader Juan Carlos Mesa had been captured. At this point in time, Mesa was the most wanted drug baron in Medellin.

=== Fabio Ochoa Vasquez ===
In December 2024, Fabio Ochoa Vasquez, one of the founding members of Medellin drug cartel, returned to Colombia a free man after serving more than 20 years in jail in the United States for drug trafficking.

=== Dairo Antonio Úsuga ===
In May 2022, Dairo Antonio Úsuga, also known as Otoniel, was extradited to the United States. He led the Gulf Clan drug cartel (“Clan Del Golfo”), being Colombia's most wanted man. In August 2023, "Otoniel,” was sentenced to 45 years in prison by federal court in Brooklyn, New York.

=== Others ===
Colombian kingpin Jose Evaristo Linares-Castillo was arrested in 2013. He is considered to be one of the most notable narcotics traffickers in the world. He is accused of producing cocaine in Colombia, storing it in Apure, and then transporting it to Central America and Mexico before smuggling it into the United States. Henry de Jesus Lopez (nicknamed "Mi Sangre", meaning "My Blood"), reported at the time to be the country's most-wanted cocaine dealer, was arrested in 2012 in Argentina. He was the leader of the "Urabenos" gang which is situated the northern part of the country. In January 2020, it was announced previous Pablo Escobar associate Luis Del Río Jiménez, alias "el Tío", or "Señor T", was among 10 people arrested during an operation conducted by Colombian and DEA forces on 24 November 2019. Evading capture for decades, el Tio had by this point in time had become employed by Mexico's Jalisco New Generation Cartel. Additionally, he also owned many fruit companies and clubs in the region of Antioquia.

As of late, Guillermo Alejandro of the Mesa Family has been pinpointed as one of the main suppliers of mainland Europe. His notoriety came to fruition after multiple reports of shipments transported in living animals, with the title "El bestiality bandito" coined thereafter. Interpol and the WWF have both offered substantial rewards for the whereabouts of Alexandro and his seemingly infinite stockpile of exotic animals. On 26 October 2019, Mesa head Luis Rodrigo Rodríguez, alias "El Montañero", was arrested on charges of conspiracy, extortion and drug trafficking.

In February 2026, Andres Felipe Marin Silva, aka "Pipe Tulua," an important colombian drug lord, was extradited to the United States.

== In popular culture ==
Some of the drug barons of Colombia have been portrayed by actors on the big screen. One such example is the romantic film Paradise Lost, which sees Benicio del Toro as Pablo Escobar. Franz Sanchez played by Robert Davi in Licence to Kill is strongly implied to be Colombian; incidentally, del Toro also appears in that film as a drug trafficker.

Several other films include Blow with Johnny Depp show the activities of Pablo Escobar.

Netflix's original show Narcos depicts the life of Pablo Escobar and the Cali Cartel.

Netflix's original show Griselda depicts the life and journey of Griselda Blanco from Medellín to becoming "the Godmother" of Miami's drug empire.

== See also ==
- Coca production in Colombia
