= En la boca del lobo =

Colombian TV series

- Created by: William C. Rempel
- Written by: Ana María Londoño; Rafael Noguera; Juan Andrés Rendón
- Directed by: Rodrigo Lalinde; Carlos Mario Urrea
- Starring: Luis Fernando Hoyos; Carolina Acevedo
- Country of origin: Colombia
- Original language: Spanish
- No. of seasons: 1
- No. of episodes: 80

Production
- Production locations: Valle del Cauca, Colombia

Original release
- Network: UniMás
- Release: November 10, 2014 – January 9, 2015

En la boca del lobo (English: Into the Wolf's Mouth) is a Colombian telenovela produced by Sony Pictures Television and Teleset for RCN Televisión and UniMás. Based on the book En la boca del lobo: La historia jamás contada del hombre que hizo caer el cartel de Cali from William C. Rempel.

Both the series and the book by William C. Rempel and Jorge Salcedo have been openly criticized by William Rodríguez Abadía, son of Miguel Rodríguez Orejuela, not only for how drug trafficking is glorified, but also for several inconsistencies shown in the book, also stating that Jorge Salcedo started working for the Cali Cartel just months before the capture of its leaders, and that the real head of security was Mario del Basto.

== Plot ==
En la boca del lobo tells the story of the man responsible for the fall of one of the most powerful cartels of all time. The story focuses on Ricardo Salgado (Luis Fernando Hoyos), an engineer and soldier who became in charge of the security of the godfather of the Cali Cartel, one of the largest criminal organizations in the world and rival of the Medellin Cartel.

== Cast ==
Actor	Character in series	Real name or alias
Luis Fernando Hoyos	Ricardo Salgado Richard	Jorge Salcedo
Carolina Acevedo	Lena Duque	Ángela
Lucho Velasco	Manuel Ramírez Orjuela	Miguel Rodríguez Orejuela
Ricardo Vesga	Élver Chacho Barrera	Hélmer Herrera Buitrago
Saín Castro	Edilberto Ramírez Orjuela	Gilberto Rodríguez Orejuela
Bruno Díaz	Pepe de la Cruz	José Santacruz Londoño
Carlos Fernández	Diego del Mazo	Mario del Basto
Manuel Gómez Gutiérrez	Coronel Alonso Vásquez	Coronel Alfonso Velásquez
Cristóbal Errázuriz	Guillermo Palomino	Guillermo Pallomari
Gustavo Ángel	Néstor Sampedro	Ernesto Samper Pizano
Patricia Tamayo	Amanda	'Mery de la Vega'
Juan Carlos Solarte	Mayor Aragón	---
Ilja Rosendahl	Christian Fine	---
Julián Díaz	Orlando Agredo	---
Alejandro Tamayo	Capitán Vagalara	---
Héctor Mejía	Andrés Lunarejo	---
Fabio Restrepo	Flavio Escolar	Pablo Escobar
Simón Rivera	Pariente Gavirno	Gustavo Gaviria Rivero
Andrés Soleibe	Jaime Gonzalo Ramírez Lacha	Gonzalo Rodríguez Gacha
Andrea Nocetti	Analía Echavarría	Martha Lucía Echeverry
Gerardo Calero	Ricardo Salgado Padre	Jorge Salcedo Victoria
Diego Vásquez	Élmer Calleja	
Fernando Corredor	Fiscal General Graudoff	Gustavo de Greiff Restrepo
Héctor de Malba	Juan de Dios Duque	☆
Pedro Andrés Calvo	Brayán	☆
Vanessa Chaplot	Teniente Marisol	☆
Estefanía Piñeres	Camila	☆
Carolina Velásquez	María Antonia 'Toña' Elizalde	☆
Weimar Delgado	Iván Guardiola	Iván Urdinola
Santiago Bejarano	Jaime Mendoza	Santiago Medina
Didier van der Hove	Alejandro Otero	Fernando Botero Zea
Jarol Fonseca Álzate	Adalberto 'El Loco' Heraldo	Alberto Giraldo
