= Guillermo Pallomari =

Chilean accountant and Cali Cartel member

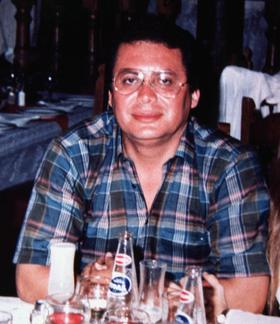
- Pallomari in 1987
- Born: Guillermo Alejandro Pallomari González; October 1, 1949 (age 74); Antofagasta, Chile
- Occupation(s): Accountant, Systems Engineer
- Spouse: Gladys Patricia Cárdona
- Children: 2

Guillermo Alejandro Pallomari González (born October 1, 1949), nicknamed Reagan, is a Chilean accountant who worked for the Cali Cartel and participated in a scandal involving financial fraud during the 1994 Colombian presidential election that bestowed Ernesto Samper (now former president) as winner of the respective elections. Pallomari is currently under the Witness Protection Program of the United States.

== Biography ==
Pallomari was born on October 1, 1949, in María Elena, Antofagasta Region, Chile, to Lilian González and Guillermo Pallomari Astudillo.

Pallomari obtained a degree in accounting, although he never formally worked in that sector. He also obtained a degree in systems engineering a few years later.

In 1973, during the military dictatorship of Chile (1973–1990), Pallomari moved with scarce economic resources, to Colombia. During those years, he obtained a work as bank supervisor and later on, in a textile company.

He married Gladys Patricia Cárdona, and along with her, founded a technological company called Universal Link. They had two children.

In 1990, he began working for the Rodriguez-Orejuela brothers, as chief accountant to manage their illicit drug trade.

Pallomari was arrested in his office by the Search Bloc on July 8, 1994, and was released 24 hours after admitting to working for the Cali Cartel. A few days after the arrest of Miguel Rodríguez Orejuela in August of 1995 he turned himself into the DEA, receiving their protection from the cartel in exchange for testimony. After collaborating with information concerning Ernesto Samper's electoral fraud (in which he received more than USD $6 million to finance his campaign expenses; equivalent to $10.5 million in 2020) and Cali's illicit operations, he moved to the United States to testify and is under the Witness Protection Program.

== In popular culture ==
- The character Guillermo Palomino in the TV series En la boca del lobo is based on Pallomari. He is played by the Colombian actor Cristobal Errázuriz.
- Pallomari was featured in the third season of Narcos, where he was portrayed by Spanish actor Javier Cámara.

== See also ==
- Proceso 8000
