= Eduardo Restrepo =

Eduardo Restrepo may refer to:

- Eduardo Restrepo Sáenz (1886–1955), Colombian lawyer and historian
- Eduardo Restrepo Victoria (born 1958), Colombian drug trafficker
