= Mariquita, Tolima =

- Municipality and town
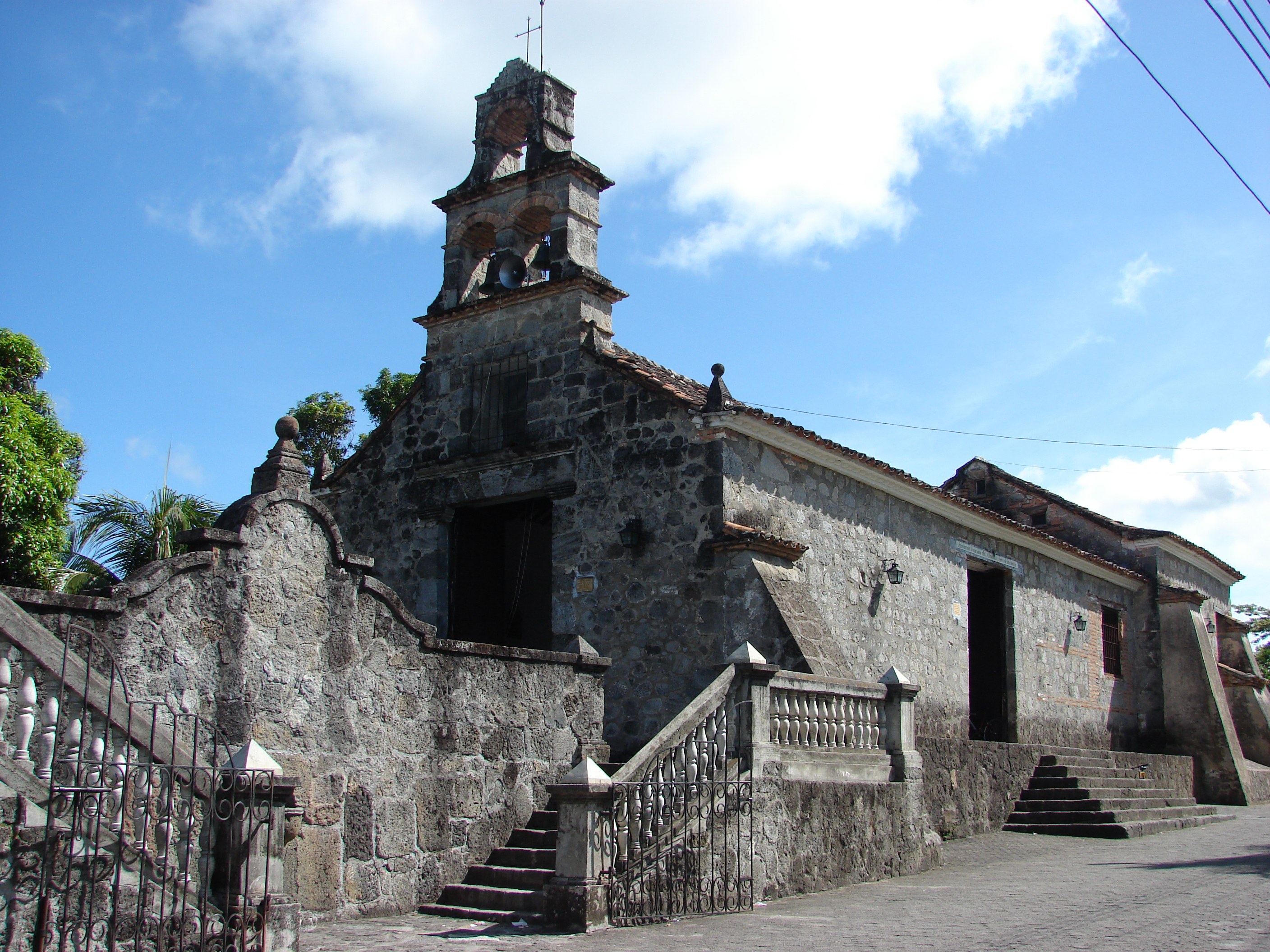

- Flag Coat of arms

- Location of the municipality and town of Mariquita, Tolima in the Tolima Department of Colombia.

- Location in Colombia Mariquita (Colombia)
- Coordinates: 5°15′N 74°55′W
- Country: Colombia
- Department: Tolima Department

Government
  - Mayor: Alejandro Galindo Rincón

Area
  - Municipality and town: 293.3 km^{2} (113.2 sq mi)
  - Urban: 5.91 km^{2} (2.28 sq mi)
- Elevation: 495 m (1,624 ft)

Population (2018 census)
  - Municipality and town: 37,770
  - Density: 128.8/km^{2} (333.5/sq mi)
  - Urban: 27,907
  - Urban density: 4,720/km^{2} (12,200/sq mi)
- Time zone: UTC-5 (Colombia Standard Time)

San Sebastián de Mariquita is a town and municipality in the Tolima department of Colombia, about 150 km (93 mi) northwest of Bogotá. This town and municipality contains several important Spanish settlements that were located here due to its vicinity to the Magdalena River. Today, Mariquita is frequented by tourists from the capital visiting attractions like the Medina Waterfalls (Cataratas de Medina) and the mint (Casa de la Moneda). The Spanish conquistador Gonzalo Jiménez de Quesada died there and is buried in the Primatial Cathedral of Bogotá. Today it is home to large hotels and haciendas, among them Villa de los Caballeros.

The population of the municipality was 32,642 as of the 2005 census.

== Notable people ==
- Gilberto Rodríguez Orejuela, drug lord
- Miguel Rodríguez Orejuela, drug lord

== Climate ==
Climate data for Mariquita (Albania), elevation 500 m (1,600 ft), (1981–2010)
Month	Jan	Feb	Mar	Apr	May	Jun	Jul	Aug	Sep	Oct	Nov	Dec	Year
Mean daily maximum °C (°F)	28.3 (82.9)	28.7 (83.7)	28.4 (83.1)	28.4 (83.1)	28.3 (82.9)	28.8 (83.8)	29.5 (85.1)	30.1 (86.2)	29.2 (84.6)	28.2 (82.8)	27.7 (81.9)	27.8 (82.0)	28.6 (83.5)
Daily mean °C (°F)	24.9 (76.8)	25.0 (77.0)	24.8 (76.6)	24.9 (76.8)	24.9 (76.8)	25.3 (77.5)	25.5 (77.9)	25.8 (78.4)	25.2 (77.4)	24.6 (76.3)	24.5 (76.1)	24.5 (76.1)	25.0 (77.0)
Mean daily minimum °C (°F)	20.2 (68.4)	20.3 (68.5)	20.1 (68.2)	20.3 (68.5)	20.4 (68.7)	20.6 (69.1)	20.4 (68.7)	20.3 (68.5)	20.1 (68.2)	20.1 (68.2)	20.2 (68.4)	20.3 (68.5)	20.3 (68.5)
Average precipitation mm (inches)	218.7 (8.61)	182.2 (7.17)	302.6 (11.91)	383.1 (15.08)	332.6 (13.09)	141.3 (5.56)	116.5 (4.59)	192.3 (7.57)	258.2 (10.17)	489.6 (19.28)	503.5 (19.82)	372.8 (14.68)	3,493.5 (137.54)
Average precipitation days	14	13	17	18	18	12	10	12	17	22	21	19	189
Average relative humidity (%)	79	76	78	79	79	75	72	70	74	79	80	80	77
Mean monthly sunshine hours	176.7	152.4	139.5	147.0	158.1	174.0	195.3	198.4	174.0	170.5	150.0	158.1	1,994
Mean daily sunshine hours	5.7	5.4	4.5	4.9	5.1	5.8	6.3	6.4	5.8	5.5	5.0	5.1	5.5
Source: Instituto de Hidrologia Meteorologia y Estudios Ambientales
