= José Santacruz =

Colombian drug lord (1943-1996)

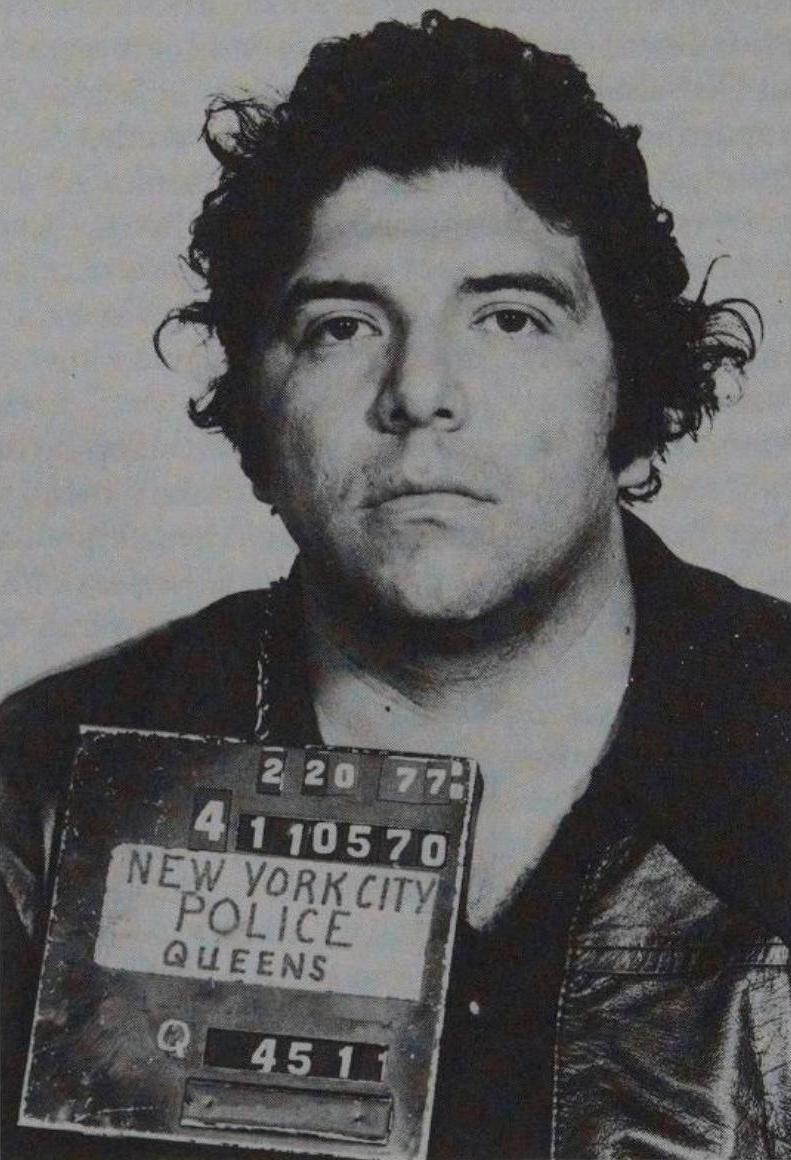
- Santacruz in a 1977 mugshot
- Born: José Santacruz Londoño; 1 October 1943; Cali, Valle del Cauca, Colombia
- Died: 5 March 1996 (aged 52); Medellín, Antioquia, Colombia
- Education: University of Valle
- Organizations: Cali Cartel
- Associates: Gilberto Rodríguez Orejuela; Miguel Rodríguez Orejuela; Hélmer Herrera Buitrago

José Santacruz Londoño (1 October 1943 – 5 March 1996), sometimes known as El Chepe or Chepe Santacruz, was a Colombian drug lord. Along with Gilberto Rodríguez Orejuela, Miguel Rodríguez Orejuela, and Hélmer Herrera Buitrago, Londoño was a leader of the Cali Cartel.

== Biography ==
=== Cali Cartel ===
Londoño and the Rodríguez Orejuela brothers formed the Cali Cartel in the 1970s. They were primarily involved in marijuana trafficking. In the 1980s, they branched out into cocaine trafficking. At some point, the cartel supplied 80% of the United States' cocaine supply.

The Cali Cartel was less violent than its rival, the Medellín Cartel. While the Medellín Cartel was involved in a brutal campaign of violence against the Colombian government, the Cali Cartel grew. The cartel was much more inclined toward bribery than violence. After the demise of the Medellín Cartel, the DEA and Colombian authorities turned their attention toward Cali. The campaign began in the summer of 1995.

=== Capture and escape ===
Several Cali Cartel leaders were arrested during the summer of 1995; Gilberto was arrested on June 9, Londoño on July 4 in a restaurant at north of Bogotá, and Miguel on August 6. However, Londoño escaped on January 11, 1996, from La Picota prison in Bogotá, after bribing several people, Londoño escaped through security glass from a faceless prosecutor's interrogation room and fled in a van. The government offered a reward for his capture.

He was in charge of consolidating the network of hitmen and armed men of the cartel, for which he established an alliance with old members of the Medellín Cartel; he was to exert more control over some of the smuggling networks, which had begun acting more independently after the cartel's leaders were incarcerated; and he coordinated the assassination of about 27 potential witnesses against him and some of the other capos of the cartel, and apparently was arranging for the assassination of important figures of the government.

=== Death ===
Being at war against the Norte del Valle Cartel, the leaders of this organization contacted the corrupt Colonel Danilo González for the eventual capture of him. They allied themselves with the paramilitary chief Carlos Castaño Gil and after the news that Santacruz was allying with the FARC to rebuild the Cali Cartel and form urban militias, Castaño and González set a trap for him and killed him along with a companion, pretending that Santacruz had eluded a police checkpoint.

== In popular culture ==
- Londoño is portrayed by Nestor Alfonso Rojas in 2010 Caracol TV Series El Cartel as the character of Ignacio 'Nacho' Sotomayor. In 2021 prequel series The Snitch Cartel: Origins, a younger version of the character are portrayed by the actor Julian Farietta.
- In 2012 Caracol TV Series Escobar, el patrón del mal is portrayed in a minor role by Hermes Camelo.
- In 2013 RCN TV series Tres Caínes is portrayed by Carlos Congote as the character of Giuseppe 'Pepe' Santamaría.
- In 2014 RCN TV series En la boca del lobo is portrayed by Bruno Díaz as the character of Pepe de la Cruz.
- In Narcos and Narcos: Mexico, Santacruz was portrayed by Portuguese actor Pêpê Rapazote. He is portrayed as being killed by Fidel and Carlos Castaño Gil.
