= Gilberto Rodríguez Orejuela =

Colombian drug lord (1939–2022)

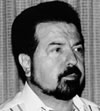
- Born: 30 January 1939; Mariquita, Tolima, Colombia
- Died: 31 May 2022 (aged 83); Butner, North Carolina, U.S.
- Other name: El Ajedrecista ("The Chess Player")
- Organization: Cali Cartel
- Parent(s): Carlos Rodríguez; Ana Rita Orejuela
- Relatives: Miguel Rodríguez Orejuela (brother)
- Criminal charges: Conspiracy to import 5kg or more of cocaine; Conspiracy to engage in money laundering
- Penalty: 30 years for conspiracy to import cocaine; 7.25 years for money laundering; Forfeiture of $2.1 billion in assets

Gilberto Rodríguez Orejuela (30 January 1939 – 31 May 2022) was a Colombian drug lord and one of the leaders of the Cali Cartel. Orejuela formed the cartel with his brother, Miguel Rodríguez Orejuela, José Santacruz Londoño, and Hélmer Herrera. The cartel emerged to prominence in the early 1990s, and was estimated to control about 80% of the American and 90% of the European cocaine markets in the mid-1990s. Rodríguez Orejuela was captured after a 1995 police campaign by Colombian authorities and sentenced to 15 years in prison. He obtained early release in 2002, and was re-arrested in 2003, after which he was extradited to the United States. There, he was sentenced to 30 years in prison, where he died in 2022.

== Early life ==
Gilberto José Rodríguez Orejuela was born on Jan. 30, 1939, in Mariquita, Colombia, about 110 miles northwest of Bogotá. His family moved to Cali when he was a child. His father, Carlos Rodríguez, was a painter; his mother, Ana Rita Orejuela, was a homemaker. After leaving high school at 15, he began working as a drugstore clerk. He rose to become a manager, and opened his own store at age 25.

== Criminal career ==
While working his way up in the pharmacy business, Rodríguez Orejuela began his criminal career, engaging in kidnapping and then, the drug trade.

=== Cali Cartel ===
During the 1970s, Rodríguez Orejuela and his brother Miguel helped to organize, along with José Santacruz Londoño and Hélmer Herrera, a loose consortium of drug trafficking gangs that came to be known as the Cali Cartel. Members cooperated in processing, shipping and distribution. The Rodríguez Orejuela brothers, as heads of the most successful of the cartel members, became the cartel leadership. Gilberto was the strategic planner and visionary, nickname "The Chess Player" for his calculated approach; Miguel oversaw day-to-day operations. The cartel maintained a low profile, avoiding flashy parties, conspicuous displays of wealth, and unnecessary violence.

In the early 1990s, after the fall of the Medellin Cartel, the Cali Cartel emerged as the leading cocaine trafficking organization in the world. They were initially primarily involved in marijuana, and branched out into cocaine during the 1980s. During the 1990s, it was estimated that the Cali Cartel supplied about 80% of the cocaine in the US, and 90% of the European cocaine market.

On November 15, 1984, Gilberto was captured in Spain. At the time of his arrest, he was accompanied by Jorge Luis Ochoa Vásquez. Gilberto had been in Spain to hold meetings with the aim of expanding cartel business on the European continent. The cartel began to work with traffickers in Galicia, and established strategic alliances with the powerful Camorra, which would be in charge of the distribution of Cali cocaine throughout Europe. The Colombian government intervened to stop Spain from extraditing Rodríguez Orejuela to the US. He was instead returned to Colombia, where he stood trial on the same charges and was acquitted.

The Cali Cartel was less violent than its rival, the Medellín Cartel. While the Medellín Cartel was involved in a brutal campaign of violence against the Colombian government, the Cali Cartel grew. After the demise of Pablo Escobar, the Colombian authorities turned their attention to the Cali Cartel. The police campaign against the cartel began in the summer of 1995. President Ernesto Samper dispatched a "joint task force" code named "Search Bloc", formed by top police and elite commandos headed by Police General Rosso José Serrano, declaring an all-out war against the drug cartels.

== Capture ==
On 9 June 1995, Rodríguez Orejuela was arrested by the Colombian National Police (PNC) during a house raid in Cali. He was found in a hidden compartment located behind a TV. He was sentenced to 15 years in prison but was freed in October 2002, by a controversial judicial order that cited good behavior and participation in work-study programs, issued by deputy judge Pedro José Suárez. The Colombian government halted the order, and launched an obstruction of justice investigation into Suárez. Within days, a second judge upheld the order and Rodríguez Orejuela was released.

In March 2003, Rodríguez Orejuela was rearrested by Colombian authorities in Cali, on new charges stemming from running the cartel from prison.

=== Extradition to the United States ===
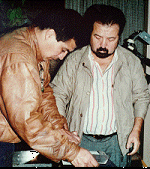
Gilberto Rodríguez Orejuela processed after being captured

Gilberto Rodríguez Orejuela was extradited to the United States on 3 December 2004. His brother Miguel was later also arrested and deported.

On 26 September 2006, both Gilberto and Miguel were sentenced to 30 years in prison, after pleading guilty to charges of conspiring to import cocaine to the US. In the plea deal, the US agreed not to bring charges against their relatives, in exchange for asset forfeiture. The brothers' forfeited $2.1 billion in illegal profits, and the US did not charge six of their relatives with money laundering and obstructing justice. On condition that they forfeit tainted assets, including bank accounts, businesses and luxury homes, 28 family members, including sons, daughters and cousins, were removed from a US Department of Treasury sanctions list that designated them members of the Cali cartel.

On 16 November 2006, the brothers pleaded guilty to one count of conspiring to engage in money laundering. Both were sentenced to an additional 87 months in prison. The two prison terms were set to run concurrently.

On 5 March 2018, a Colombian court sentenced eight relatives of the Rodríguez brothers to nine years in prison for laundering money that had been obtained during the Rodriguez brothers' time as heads of the Cali Cartel. Specifically, the court found that the family had used their legitimate businesses (including the pharmacy chain Drogas La Rebaja) to launder billions of pesos. These individuals had also shifted the money through various bank accounts in order to make it appear legitimate.

At the time of his death, Gilberto Rodríguez Orejuela was serving a 30-year sentence at the Federal Correctional Institution, Butner, a medium-security facility in North Carolina. He was inmate number 14023-059, with a release date of 15 July 2029, at age 90. While in prison, he suffered from two heart attacks, colon and prostate cancer, and COVID.

On 6 February 2020, Rodríguez Orejuela submitted an application to a Miami federal judge seeking compassionate early release pursuant to the First Step Act. The application was made despite having served only half of his 30 year term. On 28 April 2020, Federal District Judge Federico Moreno rejected the application, finding that there were no "extraordinary and compelling" grounds to support the application. The judge stated that "the court is totally unwilling to undermine and undo such public respect for the law, as well as the gravity of the offenses committed" and that while Rodríguez Orejuela has endured a litany of chronic illnesses including cancer, his criminal record was so repugnant that there is no way he could effectively cut his sentence in half.

== Personal life ==
Gilberto Rodríguez Orejuela was married to Myriam Ramirez. His children include Jaime Fernando, a graduate in international commerce at the University of Grenoble, two sons who studied at Stanford University and the University of Tulsa, and a son who studied systems engineering. Rodríguez Orejuela stated that one of his daughters has an MBA and that a second is an engineer.

== Death ==
Gilberto Rodríguez Orejuela died at a prison medical center in Butner, North Carolina on 31 May 2022 at the age of 83. The cause of death was a lymphoma, according to a statement released by the family.

== In popular culture ==
- In 2010 Caracol TV Series El Cartel Rodríguez Orejuela is portrayed by the actor Hermes Camelo in the guise of the character of Leonardo Villegas. A younger version of the character are portrayed by Gustavo Angarita Jr. and Juan Pablo Urrego in prequel series The Snitch Cartel: Origins. In film version is portrayed by the singer and actor César Mora.
- In the 2012 Caracol TV series Escobar, el patrón del mal, Rodríguez Orejuela is portrayed by the actor Harold Devasten as the character of Gildardo Gonzalez
- In the 2013 RCN TV series Tres Caínes, Rodríguez Orejuela is portrayed by Luis Enrique Roldán as the character of Alberto Ramírez Rajuela.
- In the 2014 RCN TV series En la boca del lobo is portrayed by Sain Castro as the character of Edilberto Ramírez Orjuela.
- In the 2015 Netflix Original Series Narcos, Rodríguez Orejuela is portrayed by Damián Alcázar.
- In the novel El ajedrecista, of writer Esteban Navarro Gilberto is described as someone very influential, who liked to associate with Mexican showbiz stars such as Roberto Gómez Bolaños Chespirito, or El Chavo del 8.

== See also ==
- List of crime bosses convicted in the 21st century
- Notable drug lords
