= Bruno Díaz =

Argentine footballer

Personal information
- Full name: Bruno Agustín Díaz Bittner
- Date of birth: 31 July 1993 (age 33)
- Place of birth: Villa Iris, Argentina
- Position: Midfielder

Youth career
- Huracán

Senior career*
Years	Team	Apps	(Gls)
2014–2018	Huracán		
2014–2018	→ Tiro Federal (loan)	43	(10)
2018	Tiro Federal	0	(0)
2018–2020	Olimpo	23	(0)
- * Club domestic league appearances and goals

Bruno Agustín Díaz Bittner (born 31 July 1993) is an Argentine professional footballer who plays as a midfielder.

== Career ==
Díaz's senior career began with Huracán. He soon moved to Tiro Federal on loan. After appearances in the 2014 Torneo Federal B, which they concluded with promotion to Torneo Federal A, Díaz scored one goal in ten matches across the 2015 campaign. They were subsequently relegated back down to tier four, with Díaz going on to take his overall tally for them to forty-five games and ten goals. In June 2018, after Tiro Federal signed him permanently, Díaz agreed terms with Primera B Nacional side Olimpo. Darío Bonjour selected Díaz for his professional bow on 16 September versus Ferro Carril Oeste.

Díaz terminated his Olimpo contract on 29 May 2020.

== Career statistics ==
As of 4 July 2020.

Appearances and goals by club, season and competition
Club	Season	League			Cup		Continental		Other		Total	
Club	Season	Division	Apps	Goals	Apps	Goals	Apps	Goals	Apps	Goals	Apps	Goals
Tiro Federal (loan)	2015	Torneo Federal A	8	1	0	0	—		2 (Note: Appearance(s) in the Torneo Federal A play-offs)	0	10	1
Olimpo	2018–19	Primera B Nacional	18	0	0	0	—		0	0	18	0
Olimpo	2019–20	Torneo Federal A	5	0	0	0	—		0	0	5	0
Olimpo	total		23	0	0	0	—		0	0	23	0
Career total			31	1	0	0	—		2	0	33	1
