= Club Atlético Huracán de Ingeniero White =

Huracán de Ingeniero White
- Full name: Club Atlético Huracán
- Nickname(s): El Globo Whitense, Los Cangrejeros
- Founded: May 25, 1916
- Ground: Estadio Bruno Lentini, Bahía Blanca, Buenos Aires Province, Argentina
- Capacity: 4200
- Chairman: Marcelo Osores
- Manager: Gustavo Echaniz
- League: Liga del Sur (Bahía Blanca)
- 2010: 7th
- Website: http://www.huracaningwhite.es.tl/
Home colours	Away colours

Club Atlético Huracán, usually known as Huracán de Ingeniero White, is an Argentine football club based in the city of Bahía Blanca. It played in First Division in the years 1968 and 1971.

== Foundation ==
The club was founded in the neighborhood named Boulevard Juan B. Justo on May 27, 1916. Ingeniero White is the name of the population near the port of Bahía Blanca. In this place, Huracán plays its derby with Puerto Comercial.

The swollen is known as "La Fiel" (The Faithful); and his fans are known as "cangrejeros" for the populations of crabs which are numerous in the coast of Bahía Blanca.

Huracán is affiliated to the Liga del Sur. In that league, won three championships: 1967, 1970 and 2023.

== First Division ==
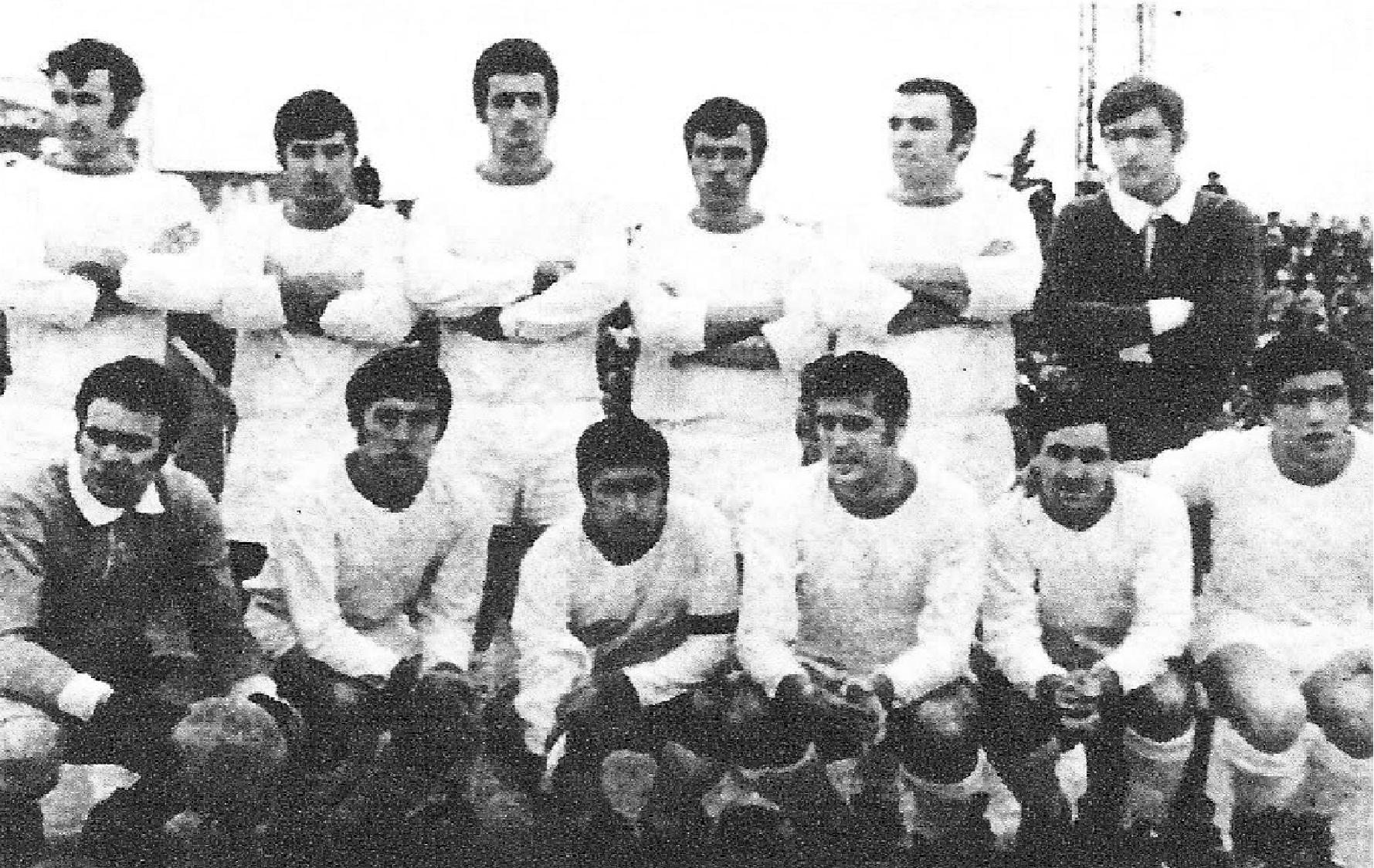
The champion team in group D of the Torneo Regional 1968.

Huracán won the Torneo Regional in 1968 and qualified to the Torneo Nacional of that year. The club was the second named ‘’Huracán’’ in First Division, after the club of Parque Patricios (Autonomous City). In this competition the team obtained two wins and two draws. Also, loses a match with Huracán of Buenos Aires City (3–0).

In 1971, Huracán returns to First Division winning the Torneo Regional. In this tournament, the club obtains two wins and four draws and tied a match with Huracán de Comodoro Rivadavia (0–0).

Huracán took part in two Nacional championships, in 1968 and 1971. In total, seven teams named "Huracán" participated in the first level of the Argentine football. Actually, the club of Ingeniero White is in the 85th place in the historical ranking of Argentine First Division

== Stadium ==
The name of the stadium is Bruno Lentini, in honor of the president of the club between 1947 and 1951. It has got a capacity of 4,200 people and it is in the neighborhood ‘’Boulevard Juan B. Justo’’.

== Principal results in First Division ==
Wins:

- vs. Central Córdoba de Santiago del Estero: 2–0 (1971)
- vs. Guaraní Antonio Franco de Posadas: 3–2 (1971)
- vs. Estudiantes de La Plata: 1–0 (1968)
- vs. San Martín de Tucumán: 1–0 (1968)

Ties (visitant):

- vs. Racing: 0–0
- vs. Estudiantes de La Plata: 0–0

== Titles ==
- Liga del Sur: 4

1967, 1970, 2015, 2023
