= Phanor Arizabaleta-Arzayus =

Colombian drugtrafficker

Phanor Arizabaleta-Arzayus (May 12, 1938 – April 3, 2016) was a Colombian drug trafficker. He was a member of the Cali Cartel and the fifth most important in the chain of command.

== Information ==
Arizabaleta was in charge of kidnappings and extortions for the Cali Cartel and surrendered to Colombian authorities on July 8, 1995. He was sentenced by the Colombian government to 28 years in prison and to pay US$100,000 in penalties. Arizabaleta also faced illegal drug trafficking charges, an addition of 60 years in prison.

Arizabaleta attempted an escape with the help of one of the guardians, but the Colombian National Police recaptured Arizabaleta on April 15, 1997 in the town of Villagorgona, Valle del Cauca Department a town in the municipality of Candelaria at a road checkpoint along with his aiding security guard.

Phanor Arizabaleta Arzayús died at age 78 in the Imbanaco Medical Center in Cali Colombia as a result of a heart attack.
