= Cocaine in the United States =

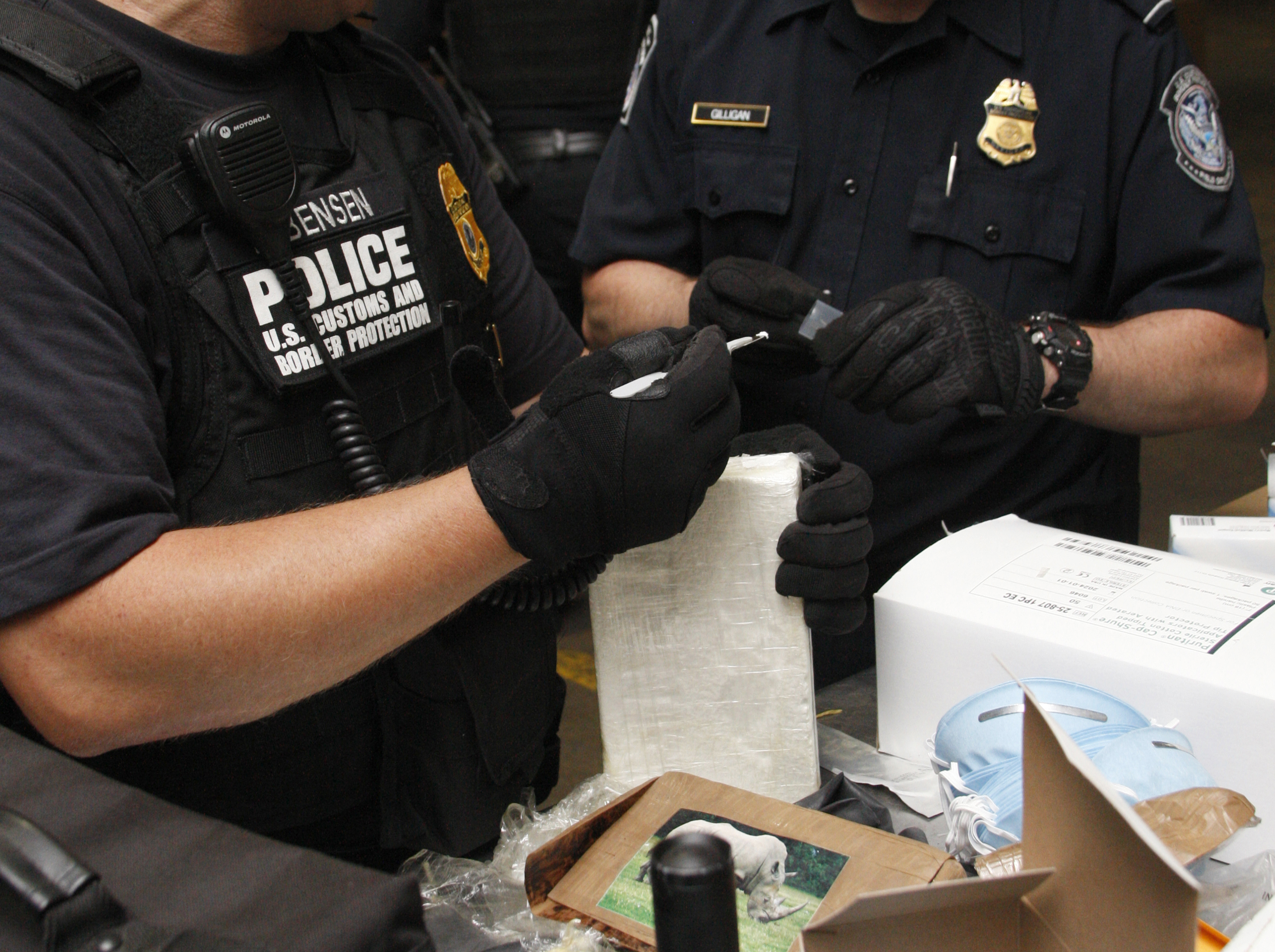
United States CBP police inspect a seized shipment of cocaine.

Cocaine is the second most popular illegal recreational drug in the United States behind cannabis, and the U.S. is the world's largest consumer of cocaine. In 2020, Oregon became the only U.S. state to decriminalize cocaine (reversed in 2024).

== Before 1950s ==
Cocaine was initially used as a medical anaesthetic or stimulant. Calls for prohibition began long before the Harrison Narcotics Tax Act was passed by Congress in 1914 – a law requiring cocaine and narcotics to be dispensed only with a doctor's order. Before this, various factors and groups acted (primarily at the state level) on influencing a move towards prohibition and away from a laissez-faire attitude. Cocaine consumption had grown in 1903 to about five times that of 1890, predominately by non-medical users outside the middle-aged, American, professional class. Cocaine became associated with laborers, youths, black people, and the urban underworld.

Popularization of cocaine is first evident with laborers who used it as a stimulant, often supplied by employers who believed it increased productivity. African American workers were believed by employers to be better at physical work and it was thought that it provided added strength to their constitution which, according to the Medical News, made black people "impervious to the extremes of heat and cold". Instead, cocaine use quickly acquired a reputation as dangerous and in 1897, the first state bill of control for cocaine sales came from a mining county in Colorado. Laborers from other races used cocaine, such as in northern cities, where cocaine was often cheaper than alcohol. In the Northeast in particular, cocaine became popular amongst workers in factories, textile mills, and on railroads. In some instances, cocaine use supplemented or replaced caffeine as the drug of choice to keep workers awake and working overtime.

Fears of coerced cocaine use, and in particular that young girls would become addicted and thereby enter prostitution, were widespread. Tales of the corruption of the youth by cocaine were common but there is little evidence to support their veracity. Mainstream media reported cocaine epidemics as early as 1894 in Dallas, Texas. Reports of the cocaine epidemic would foreshadow a familiar theme in later so-called epidemics, namely that cocaine presented a social threat more dangerous than simple health effects. Similar anxiety-ridden reports appeared throughout cities in the South, leading some to declare that "the cocaine habit has assumed the proportions of an epidemic among the colored people". In 1900, state legislatures in Alabama, Georgia, and Tennessee considered anti-cocaine bills for the first time.

Hyperbolic reports of the effect of cocaine on African Americans went hand-in-hand with this hysteria. In 1901, the Atlanta Constitution reported that "Use of the drug [cocaine] among negroes is growing to an alarming extent". The New York Times reported that under the influence of cocaine, "sexual desires are increased and perverted... peaceful negroes become quarrelsome, and timid negroes develop a degree of 'Dutch courage' that is sometimes almost incredible". A medical doctor even wrote "cocaine is often the direct incentive to the crime of rape by the negroes." To complete the characterization, a judge in Mississippi declared that supplying a "negro" with cocaine was more dangerous than injecting a dog with rabies.

These attitudes not only influenced drug law and policy but also led to increased violence against African Americans. In 1906, a major race riot led by whites erupted; it was sparked by reports of crimes committed by black "cocaine fiends". Indeed, white-led race riots spawning from reports of black people under the influence of cocaine were not uncommon. Police in the South widely adopted the use of heavier caliber handguns so as to better stop a cocaine-crazed black person – believed to be empowered with superhuman strength. Another dangerous myth perpetuated amongst police was that cocaine imbued African Americans with tremendous accuracy with firearms and therefore police were better advised to shoot first in questionable circumstances. Ultimately public opinion rested against the cocaine user. Criminality was commonly believed to be a natural result of cocaine use. Much of the influence for these kind of perceptions came from the widespread publicity given to notorious cases. While the historical reality of cocaine's effect on violence and crime is difficult to disentangle from inflamed perceptions, it does appear that public opinion was swayed by the image of the violent, cocaine-crazed fiend and pushed over the edge by a few violent episodes. It was an image of the cocaine-user that carried acute racial overtones.

Before any substantive federal regulation of cocaine, state and local municipalities evoked their own means to regulate cocaine. Because of the initial lack of targeted legislation, on both federal and state level, the most typical strategy by law enforcement was the application of nuisance laws pertaining to vagrancy and disturbing the peace. Subsequent legislative actions aimed at controlling the distribution of cocaine rather than its manufacture. Reformers took this approach in part because of legal precedents which made it easier to control distributors such as pharmacies; state and local boards of health or boards of pharmacy often took the place of regulatory bodies for controlling the distribution of cocaine. Some states took the position of outright banning of all forms of cocaine sale; Georgia was the first to do this in 1902. A New Orleans ordinance banned cocaine sales as well but left an ill-defined exception for therapeutic uses. A more common requirement was to restrict the sale of cocaine or impose labeling requirements. A 1907 California law limiting sale of cocaine to only those with a physician's prescription resulted in the arrest of over 50 store owners and clerks in the first year. A 1913 New York state law limited druggists’ cocaine stocks to under 5 ounces. Labeling requirements initially operated on a state level with some states even going so far as to require that cocaine and cocaine-containing products be labeled as poison.

Eventually the federal government stepped in and instituted a national labeling requirement for cocaine and cocaine-containing products through the Food and Drug Act of 1906. The next important federal regulation was the Harrison Narcotics Tax Act of 1914. While this act is often seen as the start of prohibition, the act itself was not actually a prohibition on cocaine, but instead set up a regulatory and licensing regime. The Harrison Act did not recognize addiction as a treatable condition and therefore the therapeutic use of cocaine, heroin, or morphine to such individuals was outlawed – leading the Journal of American Medicine to remark that an addict "is denied the medical care he urgently needs, open, above-board sources from which he formerly obtained his drug supply are closed to him, and he is driven to the underworld where he can get his drug, but of course, surreptitiously and in violation of the law". The Harrison Act left manufacturers of cocaine untouched so long as they met certain purity and labeling standards. Despite that cocaine was typically illegal to sell and legal outlets were more rare, the quantities of legal cocaine produced declined very little. Legal cocaine quantities did not decrease until the Jones-Miller Act of 1922 put serious restrictions on cocaine manufactures.

== 1950s and 1960s ==
The popularity of cocaine faded in the 1950s, and by the late 1950s many considered the drug to be a problem of the past. Cocaine became popular in America again in the 1960s, undergoing a kind of reemergence.

== 1970s and 1980s ==
In the 1970s and 1980s, the drug became particularly popular in the disco culture as cocaine usage was very common and popular in many discos such as Studio 54, even spawning open publications such as Adam Gottlieb's 1976 book The Pleasures of Cocaine which appealed to the collective experience of prohibition to call for legalization:

The path of cocaine as it stands in the streets of and north America today offers dangers not only inherent in the pharmacology of the alkaloid itself, but also in the bizarre assortment of adulterants which are added to it by black market middlemen. This is what happens when a popular substance is made illegal. We have lived this nightmare before and still have not learned.

— Adam Gottlieb, The Pleasures of Cocaine, 1976.

The drug also became particularly popular in rock music culture. Songs such as Eric Clapton's 1977 release, "Cocaine," was written by J. J. Cale.

== 1990s ==
The National Household Survey on Drug Abuse (NHSDA) reported that in the United States in 1999 that cocaine was used by 3.7 million people, or 1.7% of the household population age 12 and older. Estimates of the number of those who use cocaine regularly (at least once per month) vary, but 1.5 million is a widely accepted figure within the research community. In 2001, more Hispanics received sentences for crimes relating to powder cocaine than any other ethnicity while more African Americans were convicted of crimes relating to crack cocaine in the United States.

Although cocaine use had not significantly changed over the six years prior to 1999, the number of first-time users reportedly went up from 574,000 in 1991, to 934,000 in 1998 – an increase of 63%. However, teen use would significantly decline by 1998. While these numbers indicated that cocaine was still widely present in the United States, its use was significantly less prevalent than during the early 1980s. A United Nations report from 2001 also noted that cocaine usage in the United States in 1999 was in fact 70% lower than it was in 1985.

=== Usage among youth ===
The 1999 Monitoring the Future (MTF) survey found the proportion of American students reporting use of powdered cocaine rose during the 1990s. In 1991, 2.3% of eighth-graders stated that they had used cocaine in their lifetime. This figure rose to 4.7% in 1999. For the older grades, increases began in 1992 and continued through the beginning of 1999. Between those years, lifetime use of cocaine went from 3.3% to 7.7% for tenth-graders and from 6.1% to 9.8% for high-school seniors. Lifetime use of crack cocaine, according to MTF, also increased among eighth-, tenth-, and twelfth-graders, from an average of 2% in 1991 to 3.9% in 1999. Despite this allegation, it was acknowledged that youth drug use had actual cocaine use among teenagers had significantly decreased by 1998.

Perceived risk and disapproval of cocaine and crack use both decreased during the 1990s at all three grade levels. The 1999 NHSDA found the highest rate of monthly cocaine use was for ages 18–25 at 1.7%, an increase from 1.2% in 1997. Rates declined between 1996 and 1998 for ages 26–34, while rates allegedly slightly increased for the 12–17 and 35+ age groups. Studies also show people are using cocaine at younger ages. However, a federal survey noted that cocaine usage among teenagers had in fact fallen. NHSDA found a steady decline in the mean age of first use from 23.6 years in 1992 to 20.6 years in 1998.

== 2020s ==
According to the Drug Enforcement Administration (DEA), about 93% of the cocaine in the United States originated in Colombia and was smuggled into the United States across the Mexico–United States border.

In 2020, the state of Oregon became the only U.S. state to decriminalize cocaine. The law prevented people with small amounts of cocaine from facing jail time. In 2020, the U.S. state of Oregon also became the sole state to decriminalize the use of heroin. The law allowed people with small amounts to also avoid arrest. The measure was adopted by referendum on 3 November 2020, and introduced a Drug Addiction Treatment and Recovery Act, effective 3 December 2020. The Act introduced changes to Oregon law (ORS), effective 1 February 2021, including reclassification of most possession offences. It also introduced measures for better treatment and recovery for drug addiction. In April 2024, Oregon reformed Measure 110 to recriminalize drug possession (including cocaine) as a misdemeanor due to the failure of implementing the measure.

== See also ==
- 2019 Philadelphia Packer Marine Terminal cocaine seizure
- 2023 White House cocaine incident
- Blackfriars Massacre
- Crack epidemic
- Prohibition of cocaine in the United States
- Trans-Colorado Airlines Flight 2286
- DePierre v. United States

General:

- List of countries by prevalence of cocaine use
- Drugs in the United States
- Crime in the United States

== Bibliography ==
- Gootenberg P, ed. (1999). Cocaine: Global Histories. London: Routledge. ISBN 978-0-203-02646-5.
- Madge T (2001). White Mischief: A Cultural History of Cocaine. Edinburgh: Mainstream Publishing Company. ISBN 978-1-84018-405-1.
- Spillane JF, ed. (2000). Cocaine: From Medical Marvel to Modern Menace in the United States, 1884–1920. Baltimore and London: The Johns Hopkins University Press. ISBN 978-0-8018-6230-4.
