= Hélmer Herrera =

Colombian drug trafficker (1951-1998)

Francisco Hélmer Herrera Buitrago
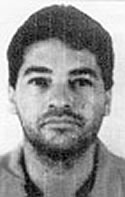
- Born: August 24, 1951; Palmira, Valle del Cauca, Colombia
- Died: November 6, 1998 (aged 47); Palmira, Valle del Cauca, Colombia
- Other names: "Pacho" "H-7"
- Occupation: Co-leader of the Cali Cartel
- Known for: Drug trafficking
- Criminal charges: Drug trafficking and money laundering
- Penalty: 6 years imprisonment

Francisco Hélmer Herrera Buitrago (August 24, 1951 – November 6, 1998), better known as "Pacho", was a Colombian drug trafficker who was one of the four leaders of the Cali Cartel. He was principally in charge of the organization's cocaine distribution network in New York City until his surrender in 1996.

== Early years ==
Herrera grew up in the Colombian town of Palmira, in the Valle del Cauca Department. While in high school, Herrera studied technical maintenance, an experience that got him a job later in the United States. Living in the United States, he also became a jeweler and precious metals broker until he began selling cocaine in New York City. In 1975, and 1978, Herrera was arrested on distribution charges in New York City for selling cocaine.

== Cali Cartel ==
In 1983, Herrera went to Cali, Colombia, to negotiate supply and distribution rights with the Cali Cartel for New York City. He later opened up trafficking routes for the Cali Cartel through Mexico, with connections he had previously established.

Herrera also ran one of the "most sophisticated and profitable money laundering operations", according to the United States Drug Enforcement Administration. Herrera was soon promoted to Cali Cartel kingpin and given control over Jamundí in the south of the Valle, and Palmira and Yumbo in the north and east of the Valle.

The Herrera operation, according to the DEA, involved importing cocaine base from Peru and Bolivia, which was then trafficked via his own transportation to conversion laboratories in Colombia. It is believed that Herrera hired guerrilla forces such as Fuerzas Armadas Revolucionarias de Colombia (English: Revolutionary Armed Forces of Colombia) (FARC) and then guerrilla group 19th of April Movement (Spanish: Movimiento 19 de Abril, M-19), to guard remote lab sites.

Herrera always kept a very low profile and was never interviewed, and his name was almost never mentioned with that of the other leaders of the Cali Cartel. Although it has been argued that he was the source of most of the money involved in the illicit financing of Ernesto Samper's presidential campaign, Herrera himself never spoke of the issue and was never formally involved in the investigation. His name came to light only after a terrorist attack on a football field in Candelaria, Valle del Cauca, on September 25, 1990; 20 gunmen dressed in army and police attire opened fire on the crowd where Herrera was sitting, killing 18, but not hitting Herrera. The attack was attributed to the Medellín Cartel, and particularly to Pablo Escobar, who apparently blamed Herrera for a car bomb which exploded on January 13, 1988, in the Escobar-owned Monaco apartment building, located in one of the most affluent areas in Medellín. The war between the cartels led to much bloodshed, but Herrera took a back role and left the fighting to the Rodriguez brothers, Gilberto and Miguel. Another attempt on Herrera's life was made on July 27, 1991, in a summer resort: hooded gunmen wearing pink bracelets opened fire, killing 17 and hurting 13 others.

Herrera was always said to be the main financial provider for the Los Pepes organization, but his name was never officially associated with them.

== Law enforcement actions ==
In November 1991, the DEA launched Operation Kingpin, which targeted two of Herrera's distribution cells in New York City. Through a large-scale wiretap effort, the DEA utilized over 100 simultaneous, court-authorized wiretaps on cellular phones. At the close of Operation Kingpin, nearly 100 traffickers were arrested, and more than $20 million in cash and assets, and over 2.5 tons of cocaine seized. In addition, records of transactions and personnel were seized from computers, which information later provided a greater look into the Cali Cartel cell structure.

== Surrender and death ==
On September 1, 1996, Herrera turned himself in to the Search Bloc (Spanish: Bloque de Busqueda), a unit of the Colombian National Police. Herrera was the last of the four leaders of the Cali Cartel to be captured. He was sentenced to 6 years and 8 months in prison for drug trafficking charges, which was extended to 14 years in 1998.

Once in prison, Herrera reportedly changed his lifestyle and devoted himself to football, becoming the sports organizer in the prison and sponsoring football tournaments. He also began a bachelor's degree in business administration. Although he was supposed to be in the maximum security wing of the prison, Herrera visited the other wings, where he would meet with his lawyers. On November 6, 1998, Rafael Ángel Uribe Serna, 32, got inside the prison and went to the football pitch where Herrera was playing. Uribe was reportedly drunk, but apparently Herrera stopped the game upon seeing him and went to greet him. After hugging Herrera, Uribe took out a gun and shot him seven times in the head. Uribe was caught by other inmates and then taken away by the prison guards, while Herrera was moved to a hospital where he died.

There are a number of possible motives for Herrera's assassination. These include old vendettas from members of the Norte del Valle Cartel, in particular a man known by the alias of JJ, by orders of Wilber Varela, who apparently had been the victim some days earlier of an assassination attempt by the Cali Cartel leaders and the collaboration between Herrera and DEA for betraying Orlando Henao, chief of the Norte del Valle Cartel and Varela's boss. Other hypotheses point to Herrera's long-time conflict against communist guerrillas. The assassin, Uribe, had been a personal adviser of Herrera's for 10 years and was a frequent visitor. Uribe declared that he had decided to kill Herrera because he had threatened Uribe's family when Uribe was unable to kill Víctor Carranza as Herrera had ordered. These declarations, however, the police investigating the murder found this story unreliable, and newspaper articles at the time suggested it was a stratagem to take attention away from the real masterminds. An alternate theory aired in the aftermath of the killing suggested Uribe was actually acting under the orders of the Norte del Valle cartel who were angry with Herrera for having released information about them, and who had been eager to take up the business left behind after the capture or death of the Cali Cartel leaders. Uribe was also the uncle of brothers Luis Enrique and Javier Antonio Calle Serna, the "Comba" brothers, who took hold of the Norte del Valle cartel after Varela died. Uribe himself was assassinated in October 2009.

== Sexual orientation ==
In the book, La patrona de Pablo Escobar, written by Colombian journalist José Guarnizo, Herrera was described as "an immigrant who went from being an anonymous Latin mechanic to one of the wealthiest members of the Cartel de Cali" and "one of the few homosexuals who climbed high in the pyramid of the Mafia". At the time, Herrera's crimes overshadowed any speculation regarding his sexual orientation. In the Netflix drama Narcos, Herrera is portrayed as openly gay.

== In popular culture ==
- Herrera is portrayed by Pedro Mogollón, as the character Hugo de la Cruz in the TV series El cartel. In the 2021 prequel series The Snitch Cartel: Origins, a younger version of the character is portrayed by Eduardo Pérez.
- In the TV series Escobar, el patrón del mal, he is portrayed by Daniel Rocha as the character Gerardo Carrera.
- In TV series Tres Caínes is portrayed by Mauricio Goyeneche as the character of Hermes Valenzuela.
- In TV series En la boca del lobo is portrayed by Ricardo Vesga as the character of Elver "Chacho" Barrera.
- In the Netflix series Narcos and Narcos: Mexico, he is portrayed by Alberto Ammann.
