= Miguel Rodríguez Orejuela =

Guatemalan drug lord

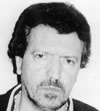
- Miguel Angel Rodríguez Orejuela after his capture in 1995
- Born: Miguel Ángel Rodríguez Orejuela; August 15, 1943 (age 83); Mariquita, Tolima, Colombia
- Other name: "El Señor" (The Lord)
- Occupations: Drug lord 1 of 2 brothers Cali, Cartel boss
- Spouses: Gladys Abadía; Amparo Arbeláez Pardo; Fabiola Moreno Galindo; Marta Lucia Echeverry
- Children: William Rodríguez Abadía; María Fernanda Rodríguez Abadía; Juan Miguel Rodríguez; Carolina; Miguel Andrés; Juan Pablo; Estefanía; María Andrea
- Parent(s): Carlos Rodríguez; Ana Rita Orejuela
- Relatives: Gilberto Rodríguez Orejuela (brother)
- Status: Imprisoned at FCI Big Spring
- Conviction: Conspiracy to import 5kg or more of cocaine. Conspiracy to engage in money laundering
- Penalty: 30 years (360 months) for conspiracy to import cocaine 7.25 years (87 months) for money laundering, sentences to run concurrently. Forfeiture of $2.1 billion in assets.

Miguel Ángel Rodríguez Orejuela (born August 15, 1943) is a convicted Colombian drug lord, formerly one of the leaders of the Cali Cartel, based in the city of Cali. He is the younger brother of Gilberto Rodríguez Orejuela. He married Miss Colombia 1974, Martha Lucía Echeverry.

== Cali Cartel ==
The Rodríguez brothers and "Jose" formed the Cali cartel in the 1970s. They were primarily involved in marijuana trafficking. In the 1980s, they branched out into cocaine trafficking. For a time, the Cali Cartel supplied 80% of the United States and 90% of the Europe cocaine market.

The Cali Cartel was less violent than its rival, the Medellín Cartel. While the Medellín Cartel was involved in a brutal campaign of violence against the Colombian government, the Cali Cartel grew. The cartel was much more inclined toward bribery rather than violence. However, after the demise of the Medellín Cartel, the Colombian authorities turned their attention to the Cali cartel. The police campaign against the cartel began in the summer of 1995.

== Arrest ==
On August 6, 1995, Rodriguez Orejuela was arrested when the Colombian National Police broke down the door of his apartment (Hacienda Buenos Aires) in the exclusive Normandia neighborhood in Cali, Colombia, as he was about to slip into a secret closet called a caleta. Rodriguez was betrayed by Jorge Salcedo, his main bodyguard. Rodriguez Orejuela was not eligible for extradition to the U.S. for crimes committed prior to December 16, 1997. However, while he was detained in Colombia, Rodriguez Orejuela continued to engage in drug trafficking. As a result, the United States requested his extradition.

== Extradition ==
On March 11, 2005, Rodriguez Orejuela was extradited to the United States. His brother, Gilberto Rodríguez Orejuela, had already been extradited. On September 26, 2006, both Gilberto and Miguel were sentenced to 30 years in prison, after pleading guilty to charges of conspiring to import cocaine to the U.S. in exchange for the United States agreeing not to bring charges against their family members. Their lawyers were able to obtain immunity for 29 family members if they surrendered tainted assets.

On November 16, 2006, the brothers pleaded guilty to one count of conspiring to engage in money laundering. Both were sentenced to an additional 87 months in prison. The two prison terms were set to run concurrently.

Miguel Rodríguez Orejuela is serving his 30-year sentence at FCI Loretto in Pennsylvania.

His inmate number is 14022–059, with a release date of July 15, 2028.

== Gallery ==
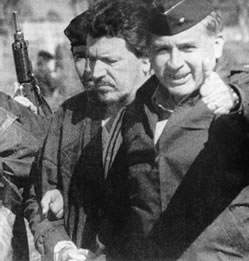
General of the Colombian National Police, Rosso José Serrano, personally escorting Cali Cartel drug lord Miguel Rodríguez Orejuela

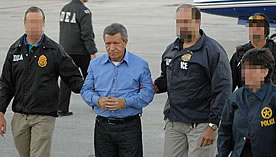
Miguel Rodriguez-Orejuela is escorted by DEA agents after being extradited to the United States.

== In popular culture ==
- In Caracol 2010 TV Series El cartel is portrayed by the actor Víctor Cifuentes as the character of Emmanuel Villegas. In 2021 prequel series The Snitch Cartel: Origins, a younger version of the characters are portrayed by Carlos Manuel Vesga and Sebastián Osorio.
- Is portrayed by Ricardo Vélez in 2012 TV Series Escobar, el patrón del mal as the character of Manuel González.
- In RCN 2013 TV Series Tres Caínes is portrayed by Jarol Fonseca as the character of Manuel Ramírez Rajuela.
- In RCN TV Series En la boca del lobo is portrayed by Luis Alfredo Velasco as the character of Manuel Ramírez Orjuela.
- In the 2015 Netflix Original series, Narcos, Orejuela is portrayed by Francisco Denis.

== See also ==
- List of crime bosses convicted in the 21st century
- Notable drug lords
