= The Snitch Cartel: Origins =

Colombian crime drama television series

- Sebastián Osorio and Juan Pablo Urrego playing respectives characters
- Spanish: El Cartel de los Sapos: el origen
- Genre: Crime drama
- Based on: El Cartel de los Sapos by Andrés López López
- Directed by: Jaime Rayo; Camilo Villamizar; Carlos Mario Urrea; Unai Amuchastegui
- Country of origin: Colombia
- Original language: Spanish (Note: With some dialogue in English.)
- No. of seasons: 1
- No. of episodes: 60

Production
- Executive producer: Asier Aguilar
- Production company: Caracol Televisión

Original release
- Network: Netflix
- Release: 28 July 2021

Related
- El cartel; El Cartel de los Sapos

The Snitch Cartel: Origins (Spanish: El cartel de los sapos: El origen) is a Colombian crime drama television series developed for Caracol Televisión by Asier Aguilar and a prequel series of El cartel. It is based on the book El Cartel de los Sapos by Andrés López López, and focuses specifically on the lives of the Villegas brothers, better known as Los Caballeros de Cali. The series is set in two eras, starring first Juan Pablo Urrego, and Sebastián Osorio playing the Villegas brothers in their youth, and later being replaced by Gustavo Angarita Jr., and Carlos Manuel Vega in his adulthood.

It premiered on 28 July 2021 on Netflix.

== Cast ==
- Gustavo Angarita Jr. as Leonardo Villegas
  - Juan Pablo Urrego as Young Leonardo
- Carlos Manuel Vesga as Emanuel Villegas
  - Sebastián Osorio as Young Emanuel
- Patricia Tamayo as Marlén Ulloa
- Verónica Velásquez as Nora Villegas
- María Camila Zárate as Rosario Villareal
- Nicole Santamaría as Mayerly Salcedo
- Laura Rodríguez as Raquel Villegas
- Eduardo Pérez as Hugo de la Cruz
- Julián Farrieta as Nacho Soto Mayor
- Juan Sebastián Vega as Alfonso Torres
- Valeria Galviz as Dayana Tirado
- Susana Rojas as Deisy
- Hans Martínez as Hernando Parra
- Ernesto Benjumea as Coronel Mauricio Tirado
- Julián Bustamante as Alirio
- Alexander Ceter as Farfan
