= John Jairo Arias Tascón =

Colombian hitman (1961-1990)

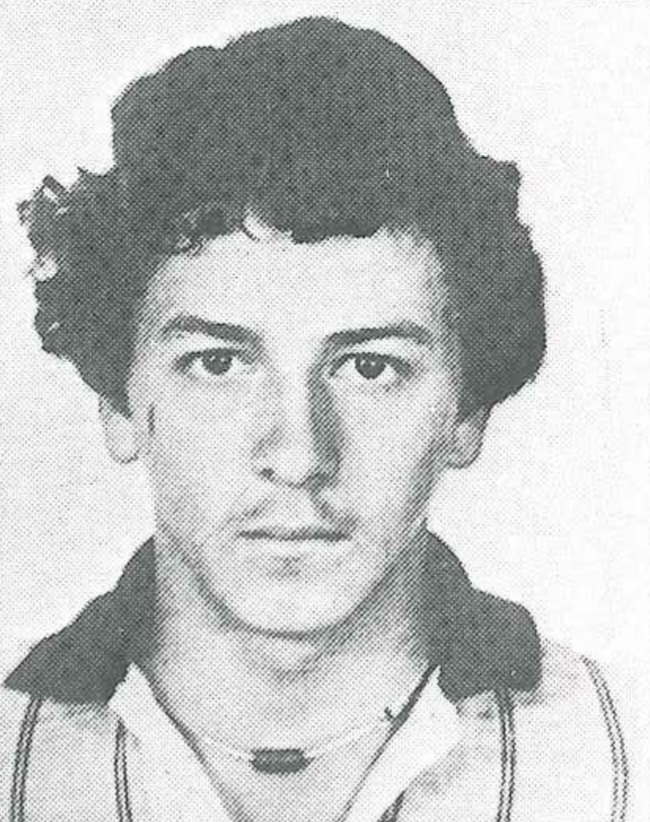
- Born: John Jairo Arias Tascón; 1961; Medellín, Antioquia, Colombia
- Died: 13 June 1990 (aged 29); Medellín, Antioquia, Colombia
- Other name: Pinina
- Organization: Medellín Cartel

John Jairo Arias Tascón (1961 – 13 June 1990), known as Pinina, was a member of the Medellín Cartel. He took power in the cartel's military wing and was accused of hundreds of murders. He was considered to be ranked fifth within the cartel structure. He was a hit man, the boss of hit men and leader of a criminal group at the disposal of the Cartel, known as Los Priscos.

His high-pitched voice gave him the nickname "Pinina" after the character of the same name played by the child actress Andrea del Boca in the 1974 Argentine film Papá corazón se quiere casar. He was 5 ft 5 in (165 cm) tall. Few photos of him are available.

== Criminal Career ==
He was born to a poor family. As a child, Arias lived in the Medellin commune in the barrio (neighborhood) Lovaina, becoming a thief at the age of 12. Later he joined a gang, becoming a hit man at the age of 15. One story holds that Pablo Escobar recruited Pinina as a member of the cartel, after Pablo got informed that Pinina had broken into one of his cars and stolen a music player from it.

Arias had a vast knowledge of the people in the commune, allowing him to recruit members for murder-for-hire. The first assassination ordered by the Medellín Cartel, i.e. the assassination of Rodrigo Lara, was arranged by him. He hired hit men, Byron de Jesús Velásquez and Iván Darío Guizao Álvarez and others, to commit it in 1984. Pinina participated in almost every criminal act ordered by the cartel: the assassinations of Lara and El Espectador director Guillermo Cano Isaza in 1986, the bombing of the El Espectador building in 1989, the assassination of Police Colonel Jaime Ramírez Gómez in 1986, the kidnap and murder of Carlos Mauro Hoyos in 1988, the murder of the Antioquia governor Antonio Roldán Betancur in 1989, the assassination of the Police Colonel Valdemar Franklin Quintero in 1989, cooperation with the arrangement of the DAS Building bombing in 1989 (leaving 52 dead and at least 600 wounded), involvement in the bombing of an Avianca airplane on 27 November 1989 (110 people killed), participation in the killing of many police officers as well as the assassination of the magistrate of Colombian Supreme Court Hernando Baquero Borda in 1986, participation in the assassination of presidential candidate Luis Carlos Galán in 1989 and the war between the Medellin Cartel and the Cali Cartel along with other criminal acts such as car bombings. According to his associate, Jhon Jairo Velásquez, alias "Popeye", Arias Tascon was also involved in the assassination of Antonio Roldán Betancur, which took place on 4 July, 1989.

== Death ==
Arias died on 13 June 1990, when the Colombian police raided his apartment in the neighborhood El Poblado in Medellín. He tried to escape through a window, but fell onto the ground, injuring his ankle, head and right arm. After standing up and trying to walk to his car, he encountered the police, making him retreat into his apartment building, where he engaged in a shooting with police officers and was eventually killed. He was 29 years old at the time of his death. After his death, the Medellín Cartel started to fall apart. In retaliation, Escobar ordered his men to drive a car-bomb into the police station of El Poblado, causing severe damage. His body was buried in a cemetery in Medellín.

== Media ==
In 2012, Caracol Televisión premiered the series Pablo Escobar, The Drug Lord, inspired by the life of the cartel chief. In it, the character of John Jairo Arias was portrayed as the character John Mario Ortiz using the alias "El Chili".

In 2013, RCN Televisión premiered the series Tres Caínes (produced by RTI Producciones), where is mentioned under the alias "Pepino", also mentioned with this nickname in TV Series En la boca del lobo (produced by Teleset for RCN Televisión).

In 2016, Netflix series Narcos used Pinina as the inspiration for Pablo Escobar's sicario lieutenant Poison in the award-winning series. The character was played by well known Mexican actor Jorge A. Jimenez.

In the series Bloque de búsqueda, produced by Teleset for Sony Pictures Television, broadcast in 2016 and inspired by the police force that disbanded the Medellín Cartel, his character was performed by the actor Sebastián Boscán, under the alias "Pinocho".
