= The Extraditables =

Colombian narcoterorist organization

- Founded: 1984
- Founded by: Pablo Escobar; Gustavo Gaviria; Jorge Ochoa Vásquez; Juan Ochoa Vásquez; José Rodríguez Gacha
- Founding location: Colombia
- Years active: 1984-1993
- Territory: Colombia
- Ethnicity: Colombian
- Membership (est.): c.600
- Criminal activities: Murder, assassination, intimidation, corruption, terrorism, bombing, kidnapping, bribery
- Allies: Medellín Cartel and associates
- Rivals: Colombian government American government Search Bloc

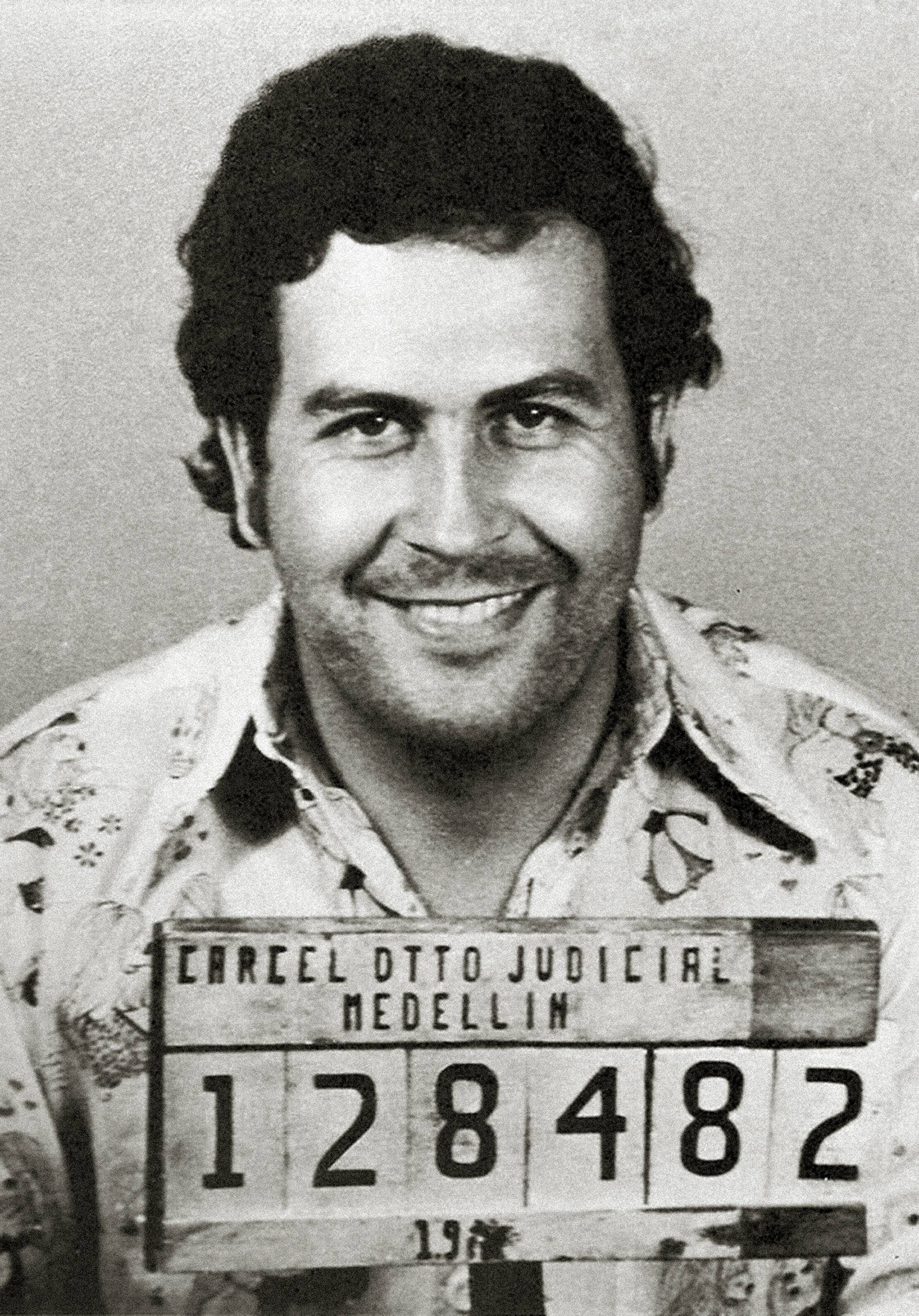
Mug shot taken of Pablo Escobar by the regional Colombia control agency in Medellín in 1976.

The Extraditables (Spanish: Los Extraditables) was a narcoterrorist organization created by Colombian drug lords in the early to mid 1980s. Their motto was: "We prefer a grave in Colombia to a prison in the United States".

== Goals and actions ==
The aim of the group was to intimidate the Colombian government into banning extradition at the constitutional level (Colombia had a treaty of extradition with the United States) and they wanted to manipulate Colombian society into supporting their goal. Initially, the group simply published newspaper adverts in which they defended their position, and influenced political parties to speak in favour of their goals.

Over time their actions escalated into a war between the state and the drug cartel, with violent acts committed against politicians and members of law enforcement.

== Members ==
Its members were largely drawn from the Medellín Cartel and others linked to the drug trafficking racket. Its principal leaders were:

- Pablo Escobar Gaviria, who was killed in 1993 on the roof of a house in Medellin.
- Gonzalo Rodríguez Gacha, who was killed by Colombian military personnel by a bullet to the face in 1989.
- Fabio Ochoa Vásquez, sentenced to 30 years in federal prison in the United States.

== See also ==
- Palace of Justice Siege
- Illegal drug trade in Colombia
- Colombian conflict
