= Fabio Ochoa =

Fabio Ochoa may refer to:

- Fabio Ochoa Restrepo (1924–2002), father, Colombian rancher and patriarch of a notorious crime family associated with the Medellín Cartel
- Fabio Ochoa Vásquez (born 1957), son, convicted drug trafficker and former ranking member of the Medellín Cartel
