= Los Priscos =

- Founded by: Armando Alberto, Eneas, Jose Rodolfo and David Ricardo Prisco
- Founding location: Colombia
- Years active: 1980s-1991
- Territory: Colombia
- Membership (est.): 3600
- Criminal activities: Drug trafficking, arms trafficking, assassinations, bombing, bribery, kidnapping, extortion, money laundering, murder, political corruption, racketeering.

Los Priscos were a criminal group affiliated with the Medellín Cartel in Colombia. In the 1980s and early 1990s they participated in several assassinations in Colombia. They were often described as functioning like the ‘armed-wing of Medellín’.

The group is named after the four Prisco Lopera brothers: Armando Alberto, Eneas, Jose Rodolfo and David Ricardo. There was a fifth brother, Conrado Antonio, a doctor. Conrado was well respected in the medical community, but he was the personal physician to Pablo Escobar. Conrado is thought to have been kidnapped and murdered on the orders of Pablo Escobar in Cocorná, in eastern Antioquia. Another doctor, Edgar de Jesus Botero Prisco, a first cousin to the brothers, was also killed.

The Priscos were involved in murder and attacks that the head of the Medellín cartel, Pablo Escobar, ordered between 1984 and 1990. They have been linked to the assassinations of Justice Minister Rodrigo Lara Bonilla, director of El Espectador, Guillermo Cano Isaza; Hernando Baquero Borda magistrate; First Superior Judge Tulio Manuel Castro Gil; Attorney Carlos Mauro Hoyos, governor of Antioquia, Antonio Roldán Betancur; Colonel Waldemar Franklin Quintero, Colonel Jaime Ramírez, the head of the transit section of Medellín, Mauro Alfredo Benjumea, of the judges of the Court of that city, Alvaro Medina Ochoa and Gustavo Zuluaga Serna, and an attack on Chamber representative Alberto Villamizar, among other crimes.

This criminal group was dismantled on January 22, 1991, when David Ricardo Prisco, head of the organization, died on the same day as his brother Armando, in two separate operations developed by the National Police of Colombia in Medellín and Rionegro respectively.
