= Jorge Ochoa =

Former Colombian drug trafficker

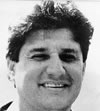
- Born: Jorge Luis Ochoa Vázquez; 30 September 1950 (age 76); Medellín, Colombia
- Spouse: María Lía Posada Echeverri
- Status: Turned in - Released by decree
- Criminal charges: Drug trafficking

Jorge Luis Ochoa Vásquez (born 30 September 1950) is a Colombian former drug trafficker who was one of the founding members of the Medellín Cartel in the late 1970s. The cartel's key members were Pablo Escobar, Carlos Lehder, José Gonzalo Rodríguez Gacha, Gustavo Gaviria, Jorge Ochoa, and his brothers Juan David and Fabio.

== Criminal career ==
=== Early years and the founding of the Medellín Cartel ===
Jorge Luis Ochoa Vázquez was the son of Fabio Ochoa Restrepo whose family was in the cattle-breeding and family-restaurant businesses until they began trafficking with narcotics during the mid-1970s. Standing 6 feet (1.8 m) and weighing 225 pounds (102 kg), Jorge looked very much like a plump, prosperous businessman. He reportedly never used cocaine and drank only an occasional glass of wine. He raised prized fighting bulls at his ranch, Los Lamos and collected Harley Davidson motorcycles. In 1976, Ochoa assumed leadership of what was basically an Ochoa family operation. Starting at least in 1978, his Miami contact was Rafael Cardona Salazar. Between 1981 and 1982, an alliance between the Ochoa family, Pablo Escobar, Carlos Lehder, and Rodríguez Gacha strengthened into what eventually became known as the Medellín Cartel. The traffickers cooperated in the manufacturing, distribution and the marketing of their cocaine. In 1981, the kidnapping of Ochoa's sister, Martha Nieves Ochoa Vasquez, by the Colombian guerrilla organization M-19 consolidated their alliance. The traffickers formed a group known as Muerte a Secuestradores, ("Death to Kidnappers") announcing the imminent execution of any guerrilla kidnappers. After being threatened with reprisals, M-19 released Martha Nieves unharmed several months later.

John Jairo Velásquez ("Popeye"), one of the main paid killers of Pablo Escobar Gaviria, argued in an interview that Jorge Luis Ochoa Vázquez was actually the boss of Pablo Escobar Gaviria.

=== 1984–1986 ===
On 30 April 1984, Colombian Minister of Justice Rodrigo Lara Bonilla, who had crusaded against the Medellín Cartel, was assassinated by a narco hitman. President Belisario Betancur who had previously opposed extradition of drug traffickers to the United States, announced that "We will extradite Colombians." Carlos Lehder was the first to be put on the list. The crackdown forced Jorge Ochoa, Escobar and Rodriguez Gacha to flee to Panama for several months. While in Panama, Ochoa and Pablo Escobar met with former Colombian president Alfonso Lopez Michelsen and offered their fortunes to avoid extradition. President Belisario Betancur refused, and a few months later, Escobar was indicted for Lara Bonilla's murder while the Ochoa brothers and Rodriguez Gacha were named as material witnesses.

On 17 July 1984, The Washington Times ran a story which detailed DEA informant Barry Seal's successful infiltration into the Medellín Cartel's operations in Panama. The story was leaked by Oliver North to show the Nicaraguan Sandinista involvement in the illegal drug trade. Ten days later, Carlos Lehder, Pablo Escobar, Jorge Ochoa and Rodriguez Gacha were indicted by a Miami federal grand jury based on evidence obtained by Seal. (Note: Seal refused to put his family in Witness Protection, resulting in his assassination on 19 February 1986, by gunmen hired by the cartel.) On November 15, 1984, Jorge Ochoa was arrested by Spanish police in Madrid, on a U.S. warrant, and both the U.S. and Colombia applied for his extradition. Soon after, the Medellín Cartel publicly threatened to murder ten Colombian judges for every Colombian extradition.

Ochoa was responsible for coordinating operations in the United States and Western Europe on behalf of the Medellín Cartel. He claimed he shipped an average of six metric tons of cocaine per month during the early 1980s (until his 1984 arrest). Ochoa had also invested in major properties at Repelon, Atlántico Department, and Acandi in Uruba, Chocó Department, from where drugs were shipped to the United States. He was also part owner of the ill-fated Banco Ganadero (Gandero Bank) where he was represented on the board of directors by Federico Molina. Molina was also his surrogate on the board of Fedegan, the Antioquia livestock federation, and the state-owned company Vecol.

=== After 1986 ===
On November 18, 1986, a Miami grand jury accused Ochoa of conspiracy to import 1,452 pounds (659 kg) of cocaine through Nicaragua in cooperation with Federico Vaughan, an aide to Nicaragua's interior minister Tomás Borge.

On July 14, 1986, a Spanish court decided to extradite Ochoa to stand trial in Colombia. Once in Colombia, on 17 August 1986, and despite extradition requests from the U.S., Ochoa vanished after receiving a suspended sentence on charges of falsifying documents for importing fighting bulls from Spain.

On November 21, 1987, Jorge Ochoa was held in prison on the bull-smuggling charge for which he was extradited from Spain. Twenty-four hours later, a gang of thugs arrived at the house of Juan Gómez Martínez, the editor of Medellín's daily newspaper El Colombiano. They presented Martínez with a communique signed by "The Extraditables," which threatened execution of Colombian political leaders if Jorge Ochoa were extradited. On 30 December 1987, Ochoa was released from prison on a habeas corpus petition.

In 1987, Forbes magazine listed Ochoa among the world's twenty richest men, with an estimated worth near $3 billion. In early 1988, an unknown entity calling itself the "Anti-Mafia Command of Carlos Mauro Hoyos" claimed it was going after the ranking Medellín Cartel members headed by the Ochoas. Included in the list were José Gonzalo Rodríguez Gacha, Jario Mejia, Elkin Cano, Mara Ospina, Gustavo Gaviria, and the Cardenas brothers. In January 1988, the murder of Colombian Attorney General Carlos Mauro Hoyos was claimed by the Extraditables.

During September 1990, Colombian President César Gaviria Trujillo offered drug traffickers reduced prison sentences to be served in Colombia, in order to entice them to surrender. Jorge Luis surrendered to the Colombian police during January 1991. In July 1996, Jorge Luis was released after serving a five-and-a-half year prison sentence for drug trafficking.

== Popular culture ==
Jorge Luís Ochoa Vasquez is portrayed by the Colombian actor Joavany Alvarez in the TV series Escobar, el patrón del mal as the character of Pedro Motoa.

In TV Series Tres Caínes is portrayed by the Colombian actor Mauro Urquijo as the character of Eduardo Rocha.

André Mattos portrayed Ochoa Vásquez in the 2015 Netflix crime drama series Narcos. The hit show is a serialized take on drug kingpin Pablo Escobar (played by Brazilian actor Wagner Moura) and the Medellín Cartel.

Alejandro Edda portrayed Ochoa Vásquez in the 2017 biographical crime film American Made, whose plot centers around former TWA pilot Barry Seal.

Harlys Becerra portrayed Ochoa Vásquez in the 2018 Spanish crime drama series Fariña.

== See also ==
- Cocaine Cowboys
- The Extraditables
- War on drugs
