= Hermanitas Calle =

- Genre: Telenovela
- Written by: César Betancurt
- Directed by: Luis Alberto Restrepo; Juan Carlos Vásquez
- Starring: Yuri Vargas; Carolina Gaitán
- Country of origin: Colombia
- Original language: Spanish
- No. of seasons: 1
- No. of episodes: 100

Production
- Executive producer: Asier Aguilar
- Production locations: Marsella, Chinchiná, Santa Marta, Medellín and Bogotá
- Camera setup: Multi-camera

Original release
- Network: Caracol Televisión
- Release: September 2, 2015 – January 25, 2016

Hermanitas Calle (English: Soul Sisters), is a Colombian telenovela produced by Asier Aguilar for Caracol Televisión and distributed by Caracol Televisión Internacional. This based on the life of Colombian singers, Las Hermanitas Calle.

== Plot ==
Hermanitas Calle follows two women who struggle to overcome adversity and achieve fame with their powerful voices. In the telenovela, the women are forced to support their families with their talent in a sexist country. As a result of the prejudice, the music the women perform is not well regarded by members of the community.

== Cast ==
- Yuri Vargas as Fabiola Calle
- Carolina Gaitán as Nelly Calle
- Jaime Correa as Samuel Calle
- Juan Pablo Urrego as Joaquín Calle
- Gil González Hoyos as Auxilio Calle
- Katherine Escobar as Rosa Calle
- Crisanto Alonso Vargas Ramírez as Lizardo
- Patricia Tamayo as Doña Tulia
- Juliana Bautista as Young Auxilio Calle
- Esmeralda Gil as Young Nelly Calle
- Melisa Caceres as Young Fabiola Calle
- Carlota Llanos as Edelmira
- Edwin Maya as Walter
- María Cecilia Botero as Isabel
- Luis Mesa as Horacio Villa
- Julio Pachón as Libardo
- Vargasvil as Lizardo
- Fernando Arevalo as Roncancio
- Carlos Gutierrez as Fermín
- Luis Mesa as Horacio
- Variel Sánchez as Álvaro de Jesús Meléndez
- Helmer Camero as Rafael
- Ofelia Agudelo as Hermana Francisca
- Alfonso Ortíz as Monseñor Cadavid
- Alberto Cardeño as Angel Cruz
- Joavany Alvarez as Ezequiel
- Luz Estrada as Sonia
- Fernando Lara as Jaime
- Carlos Mario Echeverry as Benjamín Mejia
- Danielle Arciniegas as Julieta
- Estefanía Gómez as Profesora Oliva
- Alberto León Jaramillo as Rogelio
- Mario Duarte as Richard
- Adriana Lucía Arango García as Patricia
- María Victoria Hernández as Magnolia

== Colombia broadcast ==
Timeslot (ET/PT)	No. of episodes	Premiered		Ended	
Timeslot (ET/PT)	No. of episodes	Date	Premiere Ratings	Date	Finale Ratings
Monday to Friday 9:00PM	—N/a	September 2, 2015	10.5	—	—N/a
