= Fabio Ochoa Restrepo =

Colombian drug dealer (1924–2002)

- Born: May 12, 1924; Colombia
- Died: February 18, 2002 (aged 77); Medellín, Colombia
- Other name: Don Fabio
- Occupation: Horse rancher
- Children: Juan David Ochoa Vásquez; Jorge Luis Ochoa Vásquez; Fabio Ochoa Vásquez; Martha Nieves Ochoa Vásquez

Fabio Ochoa Restrepo (May 12, 1924 – February 18, 2002), also known as Don Fabio, was a Colombian drug dealer. He was the patriarch of a major Colombian drug trafficking family. A renowned horse breeder and Paso Fino enthusiast, he died of kidney failure in 2002.

== Career ==
Ochoa kept many ranches near Medellín, raised more than a thousand Paso Fino Horses and was a successful businessman. Because most of his wealth did not come from criminal activities, it is generally assumed that Ochoa himself was not linked to drug trafficking, although his sons are well known for their involvement in the trade. In A True Story: Trafficking by Berkley Rice, he writes that Fabio, "smuggled television sets and Scotch before getting started in cocaine. He collected Picasso paintings and artifacts of Spanish culture. Jorge Luis Ochoa Vázquez, who was at one time considered the number two leader in the Medellín Cartel, was arrested in 1996 and given a five-year prison sentence in Colombia. Fabio Ochoa Vázquez "Fabito" (b. 1957) was extradited to the United States in September 2001.

"In his autobiography, My life in the world of Horses, published by a vanity press Mr Ochoa writes that 'Don Fabio is to Colombia's Horse world what Garcia Marquez is to Colombia's world of letters or what Fernando Botero is to Colombia's world of painting." A 1989 picture of Fabio Ochoa Restrepo shows him signing his book which he planned to send to the Pope.

== Death and legacy ==
Ochoa died in 2002 in Colombia. He was the subject of a brief segment in Full Circle with Michael Palin. He was portrayed in the 2006 documentary film Cocaine cowboys, where the former Medellín Cartel associate Jon Roberts said of him: "As many people want to believe that Pablo Escobar was the king of cocaine, they can believe that, but the man that was really the king was Ochoa & not Fabito the poor man it was the old man that never did a day in jail that really controlled Escobar.”

== Popular culture ==
- In TV series Pablo Escobar, The Drug Lord is portrayed by Carlos Benjumea as the character of Julio Motoa Sr.
- In TV Series Alias El Mexicano is portrayed in only one episode by the Colombian actor Carlos Barbossa Romero, and in the rest of the series by Gerardo Calero.

== Bibliography ==
- Chepesiuk (1999). The War on Drugs: An International Encyclopedia. ABC-CLIO, Oxford, UK, and CA, US: ABC-CLIO. ISBN 9780874369854.
