= Rylend Grant =

American screenwriter, author, and comic book creator

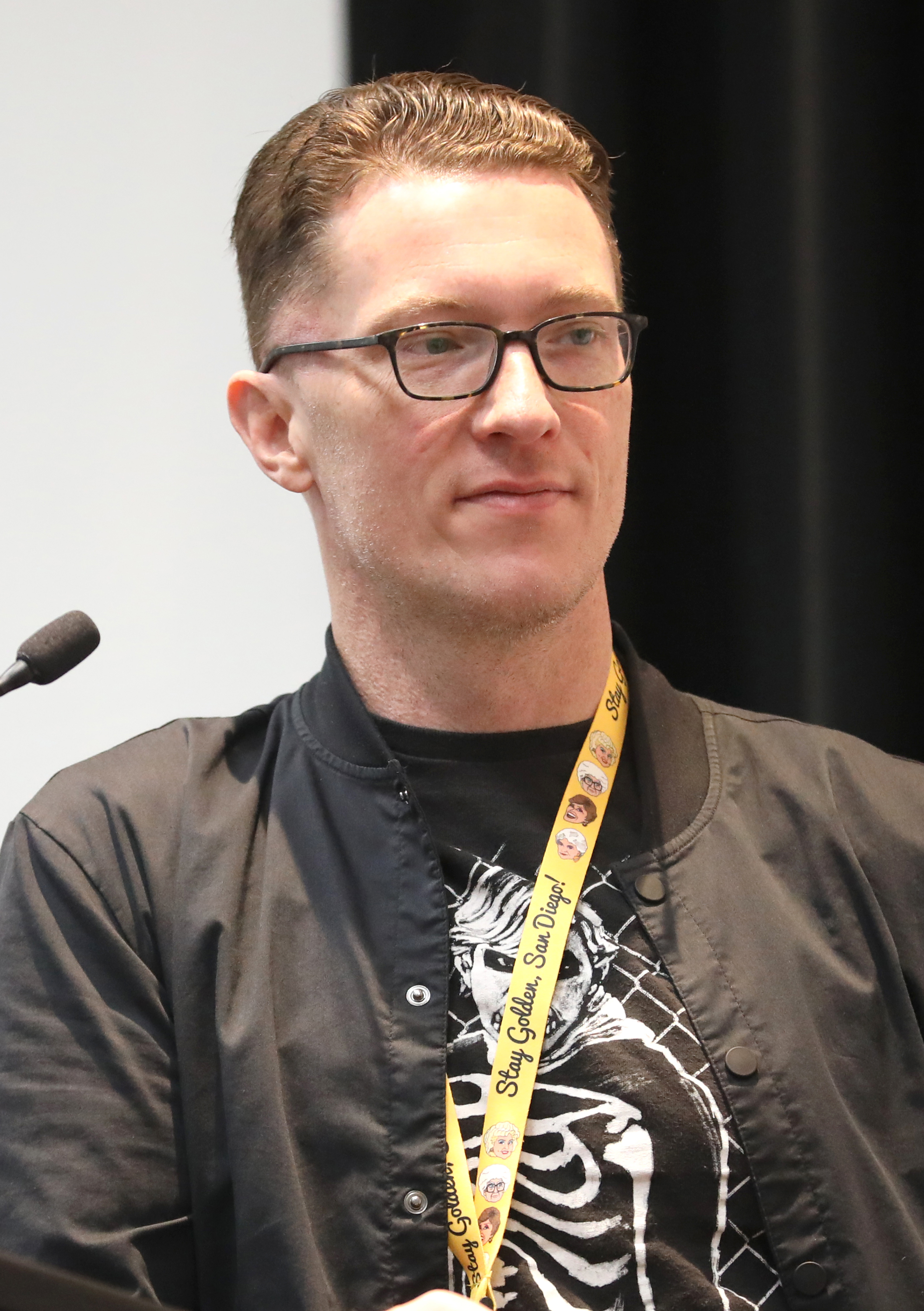
- Grant at the 2024 WonderCon

Personal life
- Born: Detroit, Michigan, United States
- Notable work(s): Aberrant; Banjax; The Jump
- Known for: Independent comic book creator; Zen Buddhist priest
- Occupation: Screenwriter; novelist; comic book writer

Religious life
- Religion: Buddhism
- Institute: President, Dogen Sangha Los Angeles
- School: Sōtō Zen
- Lineage: Lineage of Gudo Nishijima and Brad Warner
- Ordination: Ordained Sōtō Zen priest

Senior posting
- Teacher: Gudo Nishijima; Brad Warner
- Awards: Ringo Award (2019)

Rylend Grant is an American screenwriter, novelist, comic book creator and Buddhist priest from Detroit, Michigan. He is best known for his work in independent comics, including the action-thriller series Aberrant, for which he won a Ringo Award in 2019.

Grant is also an ordained Sōtō Zen Buddhist priest in the lineage of Gudo Nishijima and Brad Warner. He serves as president of Dogen Sangha Los Angeles and has been featured in discussions of contemporary American Zen practice.

== Education ==
Rylend graduated from the University of Michigan with a B.A. in film and art history and then earned his master's degree from the American Film Institute Conservatory.

== Film/TV ==
Rylend was twice a finalist for the Academy of Motion Picture Arts and Sciences Nicholl Fellowship in Screenwriting (2003 and 2004) and he won the Final Draft Big Break Competition in 2004. His scripts appeared on Franklin Leonard's Black List in 2005 and 2009, an annual list of Hollywood's best unproduced screenplays as voted by studio and film executives. In 2009, Total Film called his script The Ghost and the Wolf one of the top 50 unproduced scripts in Hollywood.

Grant has been a working Guild screenwriter for over a decade, developing film and television projects with JJ Abrams, Ridley Scott, Howard Gordon, Lorenzo di Bonaventura, Johnny Depp, John Woo, Adam Wingard, Dean Devlin, Luc Besson, Daveed Diggs, and Penélope Cruz, among others.

Grant co-wrote Haunted Heart with Academy Award winning director Fernando Trueba. The film stars Academy Award nominee Matt Dillon (“The House That Jack Built”), Goya-nominated Aida Folch (“The Artist and the Model”), and Juan Pablo Urrego (“Memoria”). The English-language film started shooting in Greece in September 2022.

Grant co-wrote State of Consciousness with Dikran Ornekian and Guillaume Tunzini. The film - starring Emile Hirsch (Into the Wild) and directed by Marcus Stokes (The Walking Dead) - will be released in 2022.

== Fiction ==
Rylend has published several short stories, many of which are being developed for film and television. His short story Thief Coach, written with Dikran Ornekian, was published online at Popcorn Fiction. The film rights were sold to Fast & Furious director Justin Lin's Perfect Storm Entertainment. Rylend recently finished writing the filmic adaptation for Lin to direct.

In 2017 his science fiction story, Botany Bay, was set up with F. Gary Gray attached to direct in the wake of his Straight Outta Compton success. His story Smugglers is being developed for television by Game of Thrones and Fargo director/producer Matt Shakman.

== Comics ==
Rylend's ten-issue political action thriller titled Aberrant, was published in the summer of 2018 by Action Lab Entertainment. In 2019, the series won a Mike Wieringo Comic Book Industry Awards "Fan Favorite" award for "Favorite Villain" and was nominated for two others. Grant was nominated for "best writer" alongside Brian Michael Bendis, Jeff Lemire, Scott Snyder, and Brian K. Vaughan and Issue #4 of the series was nominated for "best single issue/story".

In July 2018, collider.com announced that the series was being developed as a one hour television series by 24 and Felicity Executive Producer Tony Krantz via his Flame Ventures banner and that Grant would be penning the pilot and producing the series alongside Krantz.

Action Lab published Grant's next comic series - described as a "twisted deconstruction of the superhero genre" - titled Banjax in June 2019. The book was nominated for four Mike Wieringo Comic Book Industry Awards including "best series" alongside Bitter Root, Black Hammer: Age of Doom, and Something is Killing the Children.

Grant's Tokusatsu Comic Book Suicide Jockeys was published by Source Point Press in 2021. The book is described as "Voltron meets The Fast and the Furious ... with an extra dollop of heart and soul."

Screenrant recently announced that Grant would be writing the Fa Sheng: Origins Wuxia comic for Immortal Studios and Dynamite Entertainment.

Grant has released two comic book titles on Kickstarter; a paranoid thriller set in the world of astral projection called The Jump and a dark crime drama called The Peacekeepers.

Grant also collaborated with Monster Matador creator Steven Prince on spinoff of the indie comic book called Tales From the World of Monster Matador.

Grant has hosted dozens of panels at major comic book conventions including San Diego Comic Con, WonderCon, and Los Angeles Comic Con.

== Poker ==
Before working as a writer, Rylend exclusively made his money playing poker online and in card rooms in and around Los Angeles, CA. He cashed in over a dozen high profile tournaments at the Bicycle and Commerce Casinos in the mid '00s, most notably winning the $200 buy-in No Limit Hold'em event at the California Poker Open and placing third at the $300 buy-in No Limit Hold'em event at the Heavenly Hold'em tournament. He's also won or cashed in hundreds of tournaments online.

== Zen ==
Rylend is an ordained Soto Zen Buddhist monk in the lineage of Gudo Nishijima and Brad Warner and the President of Dogen Sangha Los Angeles, where he and a few others often lead classes in Warner's stead.

Grant was featured prominently in director Pirooz Kalayeh's documentary about Warner and Dogen Sangha Los Angeles (now the Angel City Zen Center) titled Brad Warner's Hardcore Zen.

== American Ninja Warrior ==
Rylend was a contestant on season 2 (2010) of the sports entertainment television series American Ninja Warrior, a spin-off of the Japanese television series Sasuke, in which competitors try to complete a series of obstacle courses of increasing difficulty. Grant breezed through the course, but ultimately failed to surmount the final and most difficult obstacle, the warped wall.

== Select bibliography ==
- Thief Coach with Dikran Ornekian - Popcorn Fiction website 2011
- Smugglers - Suspense Magazine & Near to the Knuckle - 2015
- Botany Bay - Onyx Neon Shorts - 2015
- Aberrant - Action Lab Entertainment - 2018
- Banjax - Action Lab Entertainment - 2019
- Tales From the World of Monster Matador - 2510 Press - 2019
- The Jump - Half Evil Comics - 2020
- The Peacekeepers - Half Evil Comics - 2020
- Suicide Jockeys - Source Point Press - 2021
- Fa Sheng: Origins - Immortal Studios - 2022
