= Haunted Heart (film) =

- Film poster
- Directed by: Fernando Trueba
- Written by: Fernando Trueba; Rylend Grant
- Produced by: Cristina Huete
- Starring: Matt Dillon; Aida Folch; Juan Pablo Urrego; Kika Georgiou; Polydoros Vogiatzis
- Cinematography: Sergio Iván Castaño
- Edited by: Marta Velasco
- Music by: Zbigniew Preisner
- Production companies: Fernando Trueba PC; Caracol Televisión
- Distributed by: BTeam Pictures
- Release dates: 20 July 2024 (AMFF); 23 August 2024 (Spain)
- Country: Spain
- Language: English

Haunted Heart (Spanish: Isla perdida, lit. 'Lost Island'), also known as The Island, is a 2024 thriller film directed by Fernando Trueba, written by Trueba and Rylend Grant, and starring Matt Dillon and Aida Folch alongside Juan Pablo Urrego.

== Plot ==
Set on a remote Greek island, the plot involves Spanish woman Alex arriving to work in a seaside restaurant managed by American owner Max. Alex finds herself falling for her handsome, reserved boss and they begin a relationship. Their fling falters almost as soon as it starts, due to Alex's insecurities (she is on the rebound from a relationship with a married man) and Max's insistence on keeping his past private. Little by little, details of Max's dark and mysterious past start to emerge, a past that Max is determined to prevent Alex from discovering

== Cast ==
- Aida Folch as Alex
- Matt Dillon as Max
- Juan Pablo Urrego as Chico

== Production ==
The screenplay was written by Fernando Trueba and Rylend Grant. Trueba said that he took inspiration from Patricia Highsmith's novels and Alfred Hitchcock's films. He also said that if he had to classify the film, he would classify it under the "romantic suspense" label. The film is a Fernando Trueba PC, Atlantika Films, and Caracol Inc. production, with the participation of RTVE, Ekome Greece, Caracol Inc., Deloitte Spain and Film Constellation, and support from ICAA and the Madrid regional administration. Shooting locations included Greece.

== Release ==
The film had its world premiere at the Atlàntida Mallorca Film Fest (AMFF) on 20 July 2024. Distributed by BTeam Pictures, the film was released theatrically in Spain on 23 August 2024. VMI Releasing acquired North-American distribution rights.

== Reception ==
Jonathan Holland of ScreenDaily deemed the film to be "always watchable but very conventional, never providing anything new or unexpected".

Javier Ocaña of El País wrote that "the result does not live up to the concept", with the film starting off "bad", improving a lot with the romance [between the two lead characters], an uneveness arising again when thriller fully takes over.

Santiago Alverú of Cinemanía rated the film 3½ stars, considering that eventually "it is Aida Folch who holds everything together".

Catherine Bray of The Guardian rated the film 2 out of 5 stars, writing that Trueba "gets most of the ingredients right – exotic location, good-looking leads, a few different narrative reveals up its sleeve – but flubs the execution, leaving his cast floundering".

== See also ==
- List of Spanish films of 2024
