= Amigo de nadie =

2019 film

- Directed by: Luis Alberto Restrepo
- Based on: Para matar a un amigo by: Juan José Gaviria; Simón Ospina
- Starring: Juan Pablo Urrego
- Edited by: Elsa Vásquez
- Production company: Caracol Televisión
- Release date: 7 November 2019 (Colombia)
- Country: Colombia
- Language: Spanish

Amigo de nadie is a 2019 Colombian drama film directed by Luis Alberto Restrepo based on the 2012 book titled Para matar a un amigo by Juan José Gaviria and Simón Ospina. The film premiered on 7 November 2019 in Colombia, and it stars Juan Pablo Urrego as the titular character.

== Plot ==
The plot revolves around Julián (Juan Pablo Urrego), a young man from a wealthy family in the convulsed Medellin, Colombia of the 80s and 90s. Julián grows up admiring his grandfather's power and playing hide and seek with weapons, fun that can be innocent until, when he grows up and having returned from the United States, all those games become a nightmare.

== Cast ==
- Juan Pablo Urrego as Julián
- Catalina García
- Germán Jaramillo
- Patricia Tamayo
