= El final del paraíso =

2019 American television series by Telemundo

- Genre: Telenovela
- Created by: Yesmer Uribe; Gerardo Pérez
- Directed by: Édgar Bejarano; Herney Luna
- Creative director: Jonny Torres
- Starring: Carmen Villalobos; Catherine Siachoque; Fabián Ríos; Gregorio Pernía; Kimberly Reyes; Carolina Gaitán; Juan Pablo Urrego; Juan Pablo Gamboa; Roberto Manrique; Francisco Bolívar; Mauricio Cujar; Stephanía Duque; Elianis Garrido; Estefanía Gómez; Linda Baldrich; Manuel Gómez; Alejandra Pinzón; Martín Karpan; Mauricio Mauad; Juan Pablo Llano; Leonardo Acosta; Alejandro Martínez
- Opening theme: "El final del paraíso" by JK Jurado
- Composers: César Haliwa; Juan Camilo Hurado; Eric Monterosa
- Country of origin: United States
- Original language: Spanish
- No. of seasons: 1
- No. of episodes: 82

Production
- Executive producers: María Alejandra Rico; Jorge Giraldo
- Production companies: Telemundo Global Studios; Fox Telecolombia

Original release
- Network: Telemundo
- Release: 13 August – 9 December 2019

Related
- Sin senos no hay paraíso; Sin senos sí hay paraíso

El final del paraíso is an American telenovela produced by Telemundo Global Studios and Fox Telecolombia for Telemundo that premiered on 13 August 2019 on Telemundo, and ended on 9 December 2019. This series is produced in Colombia and Las Vegas and it was announced as a spin-off of the franchise Sin senos sí hay paraíso created by Gustavo Bolívar. Carmen Villalobos, Fabián Ríos, Catherine Siachoque, Gregorio Pernía reprise their roles from previous series and also has the participation of Kimberly Reyes, who replaced Majida Issa in the character of La Diabla.

Unlike its original broadcast, Netflix released the series with a total of 90 episodes, and with a totally different ending to the one broadcast by Telemundo. Thus leaving an open ending to produce a new season, a fact that Telemundo did not confirm.

== Plot ==
Two years later, Catalina, la grande (Carmen Villalobos) assumes her new duties and responsibilities as the new director of the DEA in Colombia, her daughter Mariana (Stephania Duque), El Titi (Gregorio Pernía) and Dayana (Elianis Garrido) they have associated with Yésica Beltrán (Kimberly Reyes), their worst enemy, whose ambitions are increasingly dangerous. This time it was devastating to return with a formidable weapon since La Diabla has a new face thanks to a total face transplant. This finally manages to infiltrate the organization of the DEA precisely with the help of Mano Negra (Juan Pablo Gamboa). Without knowing it, Catalina Santana works hand-in-hand with Yésica but who presents herself under a new identity, that of Valeria Montes with the aim of slowly destroying her to end the growing rivalry that has existed between them for three decades.

Meanwhile, Catalina, la grande will have to fight against the world of drug trafficking and a new cartel of criminals who threaten to flood the country with a new synthetic drug that will trigger a war between good and evil that will put Catalina's world to the test and of all those around her, like her friends Paola (Alejandra Pinzón) and Vanessa (Estefanía Gómez), recruited from the DEA. In addition, Catalina, la grande will be cornered by Zoraya Fuentes (Eileen Roca), who became Ingrid Román regarding her husband Santiago (Roberto Manrique), who is unjustly in jail because of Zoraya.

On the other hand, calm finally comes to Catalina, la mediana (Carolina Gaitán) and Hernán Darío (Juan Pablo Urrego) after losing their child.

== Cast and characters ==
=== Main characters ===
- Carmen Villalobos as Catalina Santana
- Catherine Siachoque as Hilda Santana
- Fabián Ríos as Albeiro Marín
- Gregorio Pernía as Aurelio Jaramillo "El Titi"
- Kimberly Reyes as Yésica Beltrán "La Diabla" / Valeria Montes
- Carolina Gaitán as Catalina Marín
- Juan Pablo Urrego as Hernán Darío
- Juan Pablo Gamboa as Mano Negra
- Roberto Manrique as Santiago Sanín
- Francisco Bolívar as José Luis Vargas "Jota"
- Mauricio Cujar as Edmundo Dorantes "Sombra"
- Stephanía Duque as Mariana Sanín
- Elianis Garrido as Dayana Muriel "La Demonia"
- Estefanía Gómez as Vanessa Salazar
- Linda Baldrich as Natalia Bérmudez
- Manuel Gómez as Esteban Calvo
- Alejandra Pinzón as Paola Pizarro
- Martín Karpan as Salvatore Miranda
- Mauricio Mauad as Ramón Montecarlo "Moncho"
- Juan Pablo Llano as Daniel Cerón
- Leonardo Acosta as Alfonso Berrio
- Alejandro Martínez as Roberto Conde

=== Recurring characters ===
- Giancarlo de Sousa as Michael Rubens
- Juan David Galindo as Rocco Candela
- Ricardo Leguízamo as Álvaro Mendieta
- Margarita Reyes as Pilar
- Gloria Pinilla as Mirta Muriel
- Margarita Torres as Lizeth Muriel
- Alejandra Monsalve as Sandra
- Alí Humar as Pablo Morón
- Carlos Baez Carvajal as Young Sebastián Sanín

== Television ratings ==
Viewership and ratings per season of El final del paraíso
Season	Timeslot (ET)	Episodes	First aired		Last aired		Avg. viewers (millions)
Season	Timeslot (ET)	Episodes	Date	Viewers (millions)	Date	Viewers (millions)	Avg. viewers (millions)
1	Mon–Fri 9pm/8c	82 (Note: Should reflect the number of episodes that contribute to the average given in the last column.)	13 August 2019	1.30	9 December 2019	1.61	1.29

== Episodes ==
No.	Title	Original release date	U.S. viewers (millions)
1	"El delfín azul"	13 August 2019	1.30
A restaurant serves as a laboratory for manufacturing drugs. Catalina, director of the DEA in Colombia, cannot believe that her daughter is a member of the Babys cartel.
2	"La esperanza de una cura"	14 August 2019	1.32
Mano Negra offers Yésica the cure to save her from her illness. In return, she must fulfill six important missions. In the first task the other Babys will participate.
3	"Las Babys en Las Vegas"	15 August 2019	1.26
Valeria fools her boss and leaves the country. The Babys cartel embarks on the trip to Las Vegas, but first Mariana calls her mother. Catalina must hurry to recover her daughter.
4	"La hija pródiga"	16 August 2019	1.04
Mariana demonstrates her qualities and is willing to do everything in order to consolidate herself in drug trafficking. She knows that her mother is chasing her and is ready to face her.
5	"Conejillos de Indias"	19 August 2019	1.25
The synthetic drug XY4 causes its first victim in the United States. Alarms jump in the DEA and a new agent surprises Catalina.
6	"La pelea del siglo"	20 August 2019	1.17
The capos don't know how to escape on the big boxing night. Catalina chases after Mariana, but something unexpected happens to her.
7	"Convención de la mafia"	21 August 2019	1.20
Mano Negra negotiates with the gangsters the sale of the dangerous XY4 drug for 200 million dollars. Catalina knows the place of this meeting and arrives accompanied by her trusted agent.
8	"Madre contra hija"	22 August 2019	1.22
Mano Negra and everyone in the meeting shoot mercilessly towards the pipeline. They know that there is at least one hidden agent. Catalina falls and when she opens her eyes, Mariana decides her future.
9	"Al filo"	23 August 2019	1.07
The gangsters bid with exorbitant sums for the XY4 drug. In the middle of their encounter they receive a hard blow. Catalina suffers and asks her daughter to kill her. Mariana activates the trigger.
10	"La propuesta del Titi"	26 August 2019	1.26
Catalina receives an unexpected call from Titi. She knows that she must make a decision soon if she wants to recover her daughter and save the life of agent Valeria.
11	"El trato"	27 August 2019	1.17
Catalina's decision jeopardizes the operation of the DEA. Titi's life is also at stake. Albeiro, in the midst of his sadness, communicates with Catalina to give her bad news.
12	"Cita a ciegas"	28 August 2019	1.14
Catalina escapes from her colleagues and goes alone to meet Titi. She arrives at the hotel room, handcuffed and blindfolded; He waits for her and is ready to fulfill his mission.
13	"Lluvias de balas"	29 August 2019	1.19
The day of the exchange arrives. Catalina asks that Valeria and Mariana be released. At that moment, Titi is shot, a shootout breaks out and Catalina panics for her daughter.
14	"Fuera de control"	30 August 2019	1.05
Catalina can't stand the pain of seeing her daughter lose her mind. In addition, her desperation leads her to make a drastic decision.
15	"Prófuga de la justicia"	2 September 2019	1.18
The authorities and the narcos do not stop looking for Catalina. She prefers to die before seeing Mariana clinging to drugs.
16	"Con las manos atadas"	3 September 2019	1.24
Titi can do nothing to save his love. Soon, his partners are going to rescue Mariana and Catalina. Mano Negra wants Catalina Santana's head on his desk.
17	"Nos van a matar"	4 September 2019	1.25
Agent Rubens takes his trusted men to capture Catalina. But Moncho and La Demonia are about to enter the room to assassinate their maximum enemy.
18	"La hija de Lucifer"	5 September 2019	1.19
La Diabla fools everyone and takes advantage of the carelessness of the nurse to communicate with Mano Negra and tell him her plan. Catalina is cornered and has no choice but to shoot to kill.
19	"La fuga"	6 September 2019	1.09
Dr. Lugo injects Santiago, Jota and his group with the medicine to revive them. But despite his attempt, he is worried because they do not react and are transferred to the morgue.
20	"Cara a cara"	9 September 2019	1.18
The DEA team returns to Colombia. Natalia sees Valeria hiding in the bathroom, senses that something is wrong and decides to enter to face her. La Diabla reacts with all her energy.
21	"El esclavo de la Diabla"	10 September 2019	1.17
Albeiro goes to his appointment with Yésica and does not know how to escape. She requires him to fulfill an impossible mission in exchange for receiving HIV vaccines.
22	"El dolor de Hilda"	11 September 2019	1.12
La Diabla forces Albeiro to something more than a kiss. He fulfills his next task, which hits Hilda deeply. Salvatore doesn't know what to do with the woman he loves.
23	"El plan de ataque"	12 September 2019	1.36
Catalina and Valeria hold a meeting. The narcos organize the great attack to assassinate their enemies.
24	"La explosión mortal"	13 September 2019	1.10
The car bomb explodes at the doors of the anti-drug event. The surprise is greater when Julia presents herself with a bouquet of flowers and a bloody message. Catalina suffers and Mano Negra celebrates.
25	"Con la soga al cuello"	16 September 2019	1.21
Mariana tells La Diabla some things, including a secret from Titi that can lead to his death. Now he is in danger. A new prisoner falls into the clutches of Valeria.
26	"El intruso"	17 September 2019	1.22
Catalina wants to find Albeiro. At home, she hears a noise and realizes that someone is nearby. She points a gun and a man faces her.
27	"La muerte de los narcos"	18 September 2019	1.28
Yésica calls Mano Negra and accuses Titi of warning Catalina of the attack. Everyone in the group points to him, but Titi takes out two grenades. It seems there is no escape.
28	"La víctima"	19 September 2019	1.27
Titi and Pilar leave a gift to Mano Negra and join Morón and Cardona's son. In revenge, Mariana starts charging Titi all that he has done to her.
29	"La declaración de guerra"	20 September 2019	1.07
Catalina already knows that the dead revive. The cartels do not slow down and move their pieces to dominate the XY4 market. Mano Negra does not trust Dayana and he makes it clear to her.
30	"La muerte acecha"	23 September 2019	1.20
Cardonita's men find La Demonia, and Titi suspects something is wrong. Valeria receives bad news.
31	"Encontrar el Paraíso"	24 September 2019	1.18
Albeiro calls Catalina and will show her that Yésica is alive. They agree to meet in the Pereira viaduct. She confirms that she will go because she also has a lot to tell him.
32	"La Demonia juega con fuego"	25 September 2019	1.14
While Pilar and Titi enjoy a night of passion, Dayana takes the opportunity to look for the USB that holds the formula of the synthetic drug XY4.
33	"La batalla"	26 September 2019	1.22
Titi is going to face Mano Negra, he knows that today may be his last day of life. Mariana surprises Titi and shoots him mercilessly again and again.
34	"La súplica"	27 September 2019	1.11
Black Hand is desperate not to have the formula of the XY4 drug, he loses his head and wants to kill. His partner, La Diabla decides to end Morón and Cardonita.
35	"El Titi vale por dos"	30 September 2019	1.19
The Titi enjoys his supposed death. Dayana pretends to be Mariana's great friend, advises her not to go to Titi's funeral, but Mariana is enraged and faces her to death.
36	"Las viudas"	1 October 2019	1.12
Catalina wants to see with her own eyes the body of Titi. With pain, she approaches the coffin and is shocked. There she discovers that someone very close to Titi is present at the funeral.
37	"La Diabla en jaque"	2 October 2019	1.13
Leticia arrives at the Berrío event, she says the candidate's partner is Carla, her missing daughter. From the car, Lucrecia watches Leticia and follows her to talk to her.
38	"La traición de la Demonia"	3 October 2019	1.23
Dayana gives an ultimatum to Moncho. If he doesn't get Mariana out of the way, she will talk to Mano Negra to do it in his very elegant way.
39	"Miradas que matan"	4 October 2019	1.08
Mano Negra finalizes the details with Santos, to end the candidate Berrío, who every day passes, is more in love with the agent Valeria. Lucrecia is urged to speak with Catalina.
40	"Cero paciencia"	7 October 2019	1.33
Valeria fulfills her mission and communicates with Mano Negra. Lucrecia stays close to her to spy on her and Valeria pulls out her gun to shoot her.
41	"La destrucción de Berrío"	8 October 2019	1.15
The great moment of the presidential debate arrives. Nobody knows what to do when seeing Berrío lose control, his only idea is to kill Conde, his electoral opponent. Valeria savors the situation.
42	"Doble agente"	9 October 2019	1.13
Valeria must act quickly. The DEA suspects that there is an infiltrate in the organization that placed something in the drink of candidate Alfonso Berrío. Catalina makes a firm decision.
43	"Pelea a muerte"	10 October 2019	1.07
Albeiro is against the ropes because he doesn't want to hit Jota. Yésica threatens him with killing Hilda, if he decides not to end his great friend. The two fighters know that their life is at stake.
44	"Tu propia sangre"	11 October 2019	1.10
Mariana's resentment has no barriers. She has kidnapped two relatives whom she mistreats.
45	"El encuentro"	14 October 2019	1.45
Hilda receives an unexpected visit. Meanwhile, Daniel and Simón find the person who keeps the most shocking secrets of Mano Negra.
46	"El sabor de la muerte"	15 October 2019	1.37
Mano Negra wants to delight in seeing people suffer. It is not enough to see the fights, he wants something more dark. To achieve his plan he already has in mind the ideal candidate.
47	"Ojos que matan"	16 October 2019	1.30
Agent Valeria receives a call that can change her future. La Diabla is silent when she meets Catalina's new contact.
48	"Duelo infernal"	18 October 2019	1.34
La Demonia has La Diabla cornered, who does not know how to act. Agent Valeria looks for her best weapon to escape from this situation and plan her next steps.
49	"Trío de propuestas"	21 October 2019	1.45
La Cuina does not see Titi with good eyes, faces him and puts him to the test. El Titi must decide whether to take or reject the proposals of his partner.
50	"El político honesto"	22 October 2019	1.37
Candidate Berrío knows that his life is in danger. After thinking about it, he makes a key call to his beloved girlfriend to meet as soon as possible. Valeria agrees to meet him.
51	"Tiemblan los narcos"	23 October 2019	1.28
The new and the old guard suffer. Both sides are hit hard and do not know how to react. Mano Negra loses control and is about to commit madness.
52	"El error"	24 October 2019	1.56
Calvo is on his way to fulfilling his mission of killing his own son. The thug of La Dibla is sunk and shares secrets with Albeiro. Meanwhile, Valeria is surprised with what she hears.
53	"Sin salida"	25 October 2019	1.34
Mariana is desperate and wants to flee Mexico as soon as possible. She knows that her brother and daughter are in danger. Mano Negra is thirsty for revenge.
54	"Madre hay solo una"	28 October 2019	1.45
55	"Cazar a las Babys"	29 October 2019	1.35
56	"La labor perfecta"	30 October 2019	1.34
57	"Las dos caras del infierno"	31 October 2019	1.44
58	"Un golpe sin piedad"	1 November 2019	1.30
59	"El sacrificio"	4 November 2019	1.38
60	"La mano negra de la Diabla"	5 November 2019	1.44
61	"Contra las rejas"	6 November 2019	1.45
62	"Al descubierto"	7 November 2019	1.45
63	"El duelo"	8 November 2019	1.44
64	"De ángel a demonio"	11 November 2019	1.51
65	"El dolor más profundo"	12 November 2019	1.62
66	"Cuenta atrás para morir"	13 November 2019	1.50
67	"Los hijos narcos"	14 November 2019	1.33
68	"Enfrentar a la primera dama"	15 November 2019	1.63
69	"Tentar a la Diabla"	18 November 2019	1.42
70	"Todos para una"	19 November 2019	1.42
71	"La negación"	20 November 2019	1.47
72	"Cerca del infierno"	21 November 2019	1.45
73	"El golpe a la Diabla"	22 November 2019	1.42
74	"Guerra a muerte"	25 November 2019	1.41
75	"Confesiones de pareja"	26 November 2019	1.23
76	"Dos pájaros de un solo tiro"	27 November 2019	1.29
77	"Enemiga número 1"	2 December 2019	1.30
78	"Entre la vida y la muerte"	3 December 2019	1.27
79	"En la boca del lobo"	4 December 2019	1.18
80	"La pelea final"	5 December 2019	1.35
81	"El canje"	6 December 2019	1.27
82	"Llegó tu hora"	9 December 2019	1.61
