= Surviving Escobar: Alias JJ =

2017 Colombian crime drama television series

- Genre: Crime drama
- Based on: Sobreviviendo a Pablo Escobar by Jhon Jairo Velásquez
- Screenplay by: Gerardo Pinzón; Andrés Ramírez; Catalina Coy; Johnny Ortiz; Jorg Hiller
- Directed by: Luis Alberto Restrepo; Juan Carlos Vásquez; Jorge Sandoval
- Creative directors: Guarnizo & Lizarralde
- Music by: Jox
- Country of origin: Colombia
- Original language: Spanish
- No. of seasons: 1
- No. of episodes: 69

Production
- Executive producer: Asier Aguilar
- Editor: Fabián Rodríguez
- Camera setup: Multi-camera
- Production company: Caracol Televisión

Original release
- Network: Caracol Televisión
- Release: 8 February – 23 May 2017

Surviving Escobar: Alias JJ (Spanish: Sobreviviendo a Escobar, Alias JJ) is a Colombian crime drama television series produced by Asier Aguilar, based on the book Sobreviviendo a Pablo Escobar by Jhon Jairo Velásquez, the lieutenant and right hand of Pablo Escobar, and stars Juan Pablo Urrego as the titular character. The series premiered in Colombia on Caracol Televisión on 8 February 2017 as Alias J.J., lo que pasa tras las rejas, and concluded on 23 May 2017. On Netflix the series premiered on 1 August 2017 with a total of sixty episodes, being available until 1 August 2023 due to licensing restrictions.

The first episode of the series debuted with a total of 8.4 million viewers in Colombia, becoming the most watched production at 10:00pm, and surpassing El Comandante of RCN Televisión. Due to its good acceptance by the Colombian audience, the series was extended to 69 episodes, of the 60 that had already been sold internationally. The last episode aired on 23 May 2017, averaged a total of 9.8 million viewers, ranking third among the most viewed programs nationwide in Colombia.

== Plot ==
Sobreviviendo a Escobar recounts the life of Alias "JJ" after becoming the only survivor of the so-called "Extraditables". Everything begins in the decline of Pablo Escobar, when Alias "JJ" decides to surrender to justice. Already in prison he must face his enemies and use all his tactics not only to survive, but to establish again as a great capo inside the prison and continue his reign of terror, returning to be a feared drug trafficker from the prison.

== Cast ==
- Juan Pablo Urrego as Jhon Jairo Velásquez
- Amparo Grisales as Mónica Machado
- Nicole Santamaría as Alexandra Restrepo
- Elkin Díaz as Abel Mahecha
- Pacho Rueda as Pedro “El Potro” Rentería
- Lina Marcela Castrillón as Victoria de Mahecha
- Toto Vega as Iván Darío Urrego Cuartas
- Ramsés Ramos as Comandante / Tulio Galeno
- Mario Bolaños as Carlos Castañeda
- Juan Felipe Muñoz as alias "Piojo"
- Frank Beltrán as Leonidas Caicedo alias "Zurcido"
- Adrián Jiménez as Duván
- Victoria Hernández as Rosa Restrepo Jaramillo
- Ulices González as «gordo Robledo»
- Salvador Puentes as alias "3H"
- Natasha Klauss as Ana María Solozábal

=== Special participation ===
- Juan Pablo Franco as Pablo Emilio Escobar Gaviria
- Angélica Blandón as Lorenza Penagos
- Luis Mesa as Ignacio Molina
- Héctor Hernández as Gabriel Mendoza
- Julio Sanchez Coccaro as Eduardo Bejarano

== Episodes ==
No.	Title	Original release date	Colombia viewers (millions)
1	"J.J. se entrega a las autoridades con tal de evitar su muerte"	8 February 2017	8.4
2	"Alexandra cae en manos de la Fiscalía, mientras J.J. busca alianzas en la cárcel"	9 February 2017	8.4
3	"J.J. frustra el plan de Abel Mahecha de liberar a ‘3H’ de la cárcel"	10 February 2017	7.3
4	"J.J. se gana la confianza de los paramilitares al liderar un motín"	13 February 2017	8.2
5	"Alias J.J. sobrevive a un nuevo atentado y le salva la vida a uno de sus enemigos"	14 February 2017	7.9
6	"Cegada por su ira, Alexandra decide hablar con las autoridades"	15 February 2017	9.1
7	"Con la desaparición de ‘El Potro’ y ‘3H’, J.J. es enviado al calabozo"	16 February 2017	8.8
8	"Los problemas aumentan para J.J. al ser acusado de planear la fuga de ‘3H’"	17 February 2017	8.8
9	"Alexandra le entrega a la Fiscalía el mapa que conduce a la caleta de J.J."	20 February 2017	9.0
10	"‘El Potro’ se lleva a Alexandra por la fuerza para apartarla de la DEA"	21 February 2017	8.8
11	"Por escapar del ‘Potro’, Alexandra expone la vida de su bebé"	22 February 2017	9.0
12	"Alexandra visita a J.J. para contarle que la caleta fue destruida"	23 February 2017	7.9
13	"J.J. utiliza información que tiene sobre el Cartel del Valle para salvarse"	27 February 2017	7.9
14	"‘El Potro’ logra su cometido y pone en riesgo la vida de J.J. en la cárcel"	28 February 2017	8.0
15	"Alexandra y ‘Caspa’ inician la búsqueda de una caleta de Pablo Escobar"	1 March 2017	7.3
16	"J.J. hace un trato con Urrego para que le deje la vida en paz"	2 March 2017	7.2
17	"J.J. se salva de un atentado en la cárcel, pero queda gravemente herido"	3 March 2017	7.6
18	"Para blindarse en la cárcel, J.J. hace grandes denuncias en una entrevista"	6 March 2017	6.9
19	"J.J. encuentra la forma de ingresar droga a la cárcel y aliarse con Urrego"	7 March 2017	8.1
20	"J.J. enfurece al enterarse de que Alexandra le es infiel con otro hombre"	8 March 2017	7.7
21	"Galeno y J.J. aprovechan la fiesta de Urrego para emprender su plan de fuga"	9 March 2017	7.4
22	"La abogada de J.J. se convierte en su carta de salvación"	10 March 2017	8.0
23	"Toledo no llega a ningún acuerdo con J.J. y sus planes se frustran"	13 March 2017	7.1
24	"J.J. recibe una rebaja de pena al colaborar en un operativo de rescate"	14 March 2017	8.4
25	"¿Nuevo amor? J.J., se involucra con una joven que lo visita a la cárcel"	15 March 2017	8.8
26	"J.J. busca acabar la guerra en la cárcel para evitar su traslado"	16 March 2017	8.7
27	"J.J. es trasladado a Valledupar a pesar de los esfuerzos de su abogada"	17 March 2017	7.0
28	"¿Cumplirán?, Galeno y Mahecha firman un tratado de paz en la cárcel"	21 March 2017	7.3
29	"J.J. descubre los planes de Danilo y decide tomar cartas en el asunto"	22 March 2017	7.5
30	"J.J. monta su negocio en la cárcel y hace una alianza con Danilo"	23 March 2017	8.1
31	"Una muerte inesperada podría cambiar la suerte de J.J. en la cárcel"	24 March 2017	8.1
32	"Urrego regresa de la muerte para vengarse de Alias J.J."	27 March 2017	7.6
33	"Jennifer acaba con la vida de Durán para salvar el negocio de J.J."	29 March 2017	7.8
34	"Alias J.J. se convierte en uno de los caciques de la cárcel Capital"	30 March 2017	7.5
35	"Mahecha busca aliarse con J.J. para retomar su poder entre los paramilitares"	31 March 2017	8.2
36	"Ana pone en riesgo la vida de una periodista y es descubierta por Jennifer"	3 April 2017	8.0
37	"Ana descubre la red de drogas de J.J. en sus libros y queda acorralado"	4 April 2017	7.3
38	"J.J. hace una jugada que lo saca inocente del escándalo de drogas"	5 April 2017	6.8
39	"Una investigación pone en riesgo el puesto de Clemente en la cárcel"	6 April 2017	7.6
40	"Alias J.J. queda entre la espada y la pared tras las declaraciones de ‘Zurcido’"	7 April 2017	8.0
41	"Tras sufrir un atentado, ‘Caspa’ está dispuesto a revelar lo que sabe de Alias J.J."	10 April 2017	7.0
42	"‘Caspa’ protege a J.J. y decide culpar a su leal seguidor"	11 April 2017	6.3
43	"Ana María hace un peligroso trato con J.J. para ayudar a su colega"	12 April 2017	N/A
44	"Alias J.J. acaba con la vida de ‘Caspa’ para no ser extraditado"	17 April 2017	7.3
45	"Muerte del periodista Garcés pone de nuevo en el ojo del huracán a J.J."	18 April 2017	6.8
46	"J.J. hace un nuevo trato con Mahecha para que deje en paz a Ana María"	19 April 2017	7.1
47	"J.J manipula a Ana María para limpiar su nombre ante la prensa"	20 April 2017	7.5
48	"Ana María cree en las mentiras de J.J. y termina protegiéndolo"	21 April 2017	6.7
49	"Ana María renuncia a su investigación al enterarse de la verdad"	24 April 2017	6.9
50	"Ana María hace un terrible descubrimiento sobre Popeye como sicario"	25 April 2017	6.8
51	"Mahecha ve opacada su salida de la cárcel por el testimonio de Janeth"	26 April 2017	7.2
52	"Urrego le envía a su sobrino un terrible mensaje por su traición"	27 April 2017	6.6
53	"Mahecha toma como rehén a Clemente para escaparse de la cárcel"	28 April 2017	6.6
54	"Una tragedia mancha de sangre la Cárcel Capital y le complica las cosas a J.J."	2 May 2017	7.8
55	"Alias J.J. es declarado inocente del asesinato del padre de Ana María Solozábal"	3 May 2017	7.5
56	"Ana María se propone encontrar a Alexandra para hundir a Popeye"	4 May 2017	7.2
57	"Poco a poco, las autoridades dan con la red de narcotráfico de J.J."	5 May 2017	7.8
58	"Solo y desesperado, J.J. ve cada vez más cerca su extradición"	8 May 2017	7.3
59	"¿El fin? J.J., es sentenciado a pasar 20 años de cárcel en Estados Unidos"	9 May 2017	7.5
60	"J.J. hace un importante acuerdo con la DEA que lo salva de ser extraditado"	10 May 2017	6.6
61	"J.J. encuentra a Alexandra para pedirle explicaciones por su ‘traición’"	11 May 2017	7.7
62	"J.J. regresa al ‘ruedo’ y busca cómo reabrir su negocio de narcotráfico"	12 May 2017	N/A
63	"¿Aceptará?, Serrano recibe una importante propuesta para acabar con J.J."	15 May 2017	8.0
64	"Serrano acepta matar a J.J., pero el destino de todos da un giro inesperado"	16 May 2017	7.7
65	"J.J. ordena sacar del camino a Ana María tras una contundente declaración"	17 May 2017	7.4
66	"La suerte vuelve a jugar del lado de J.J. y logra evitar una recaptura"	18 May 2017	9.2
67	"J.J. se niega a entregar al ‘Señor de los aires’ y todo se pone en su contra"	19 May 2017	7.8
68	"Las autoridades capturan a Serrano y se acercan más al paradero de J.J."	22 May 2017	9.0
69	"J.J. es recapturado, pero con su condena no podrá pagar el daño que hizo"	23 May 2017	9.8
