= Apartadó =

- Municipality and city
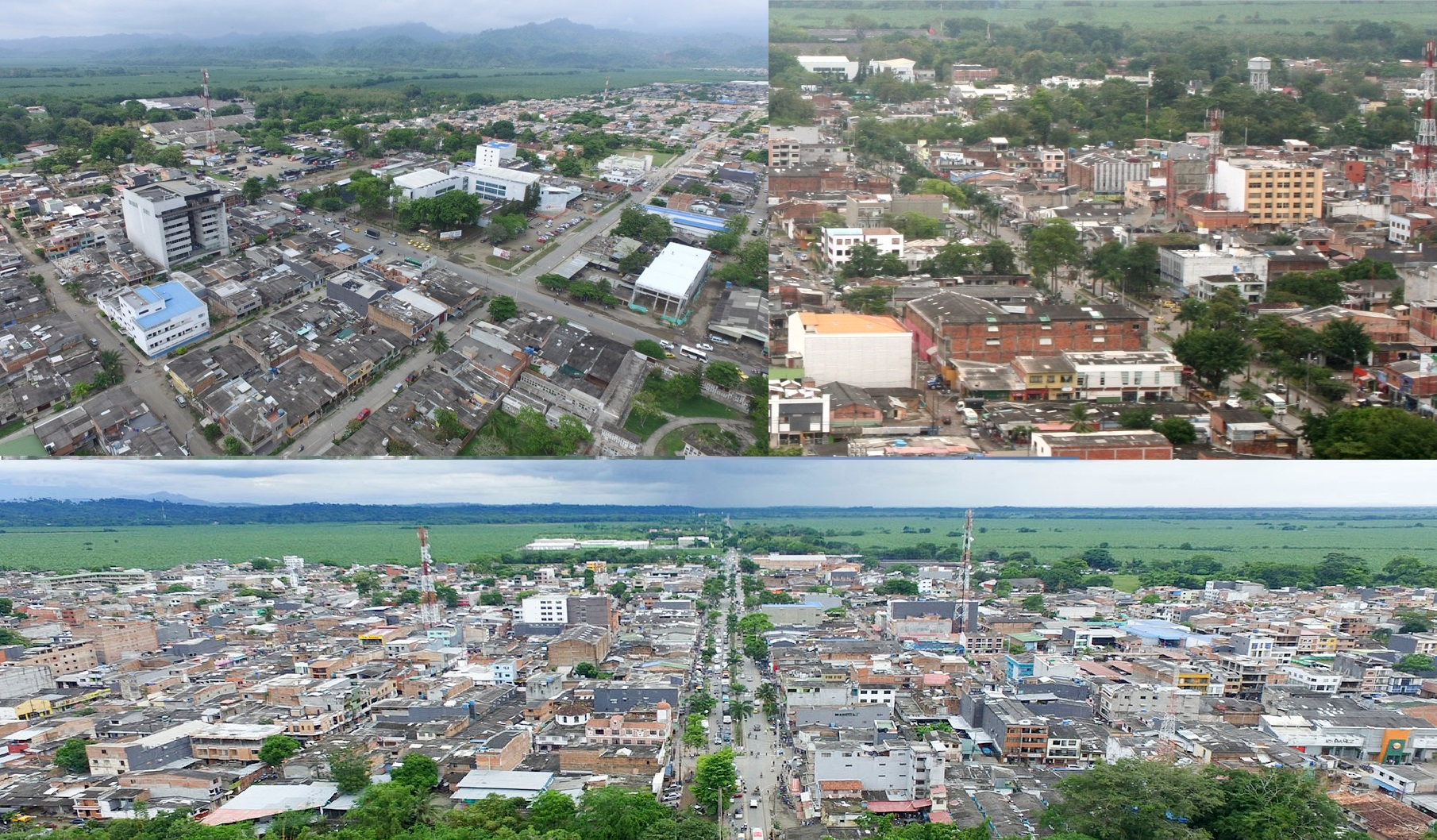

- Flag Coat of arms

- Location of the municipality and city of Apartadó in the Antioquia Department of Colombia

- Location in Colombia
- Coordinates: 7°53′N 76°38′W
- Country: Colombia
- Department: Antioquia
- Subregion: Urabá
- Founded: 1907

Government
  - Mayor: Jose David Rangel Sangano

Area
  - Municipality and city: 535.2 km^{2} (206.6 sq mi)
  - Urban: 5.91 km^{2} (2.28 sq mi)
- Elevation: 30 m (98 ft)

Population (2020 est.)
  - Municipality and city: 127,744
  - Density: 238.7/km^{2} (618.2/sq mi)
  - Urban: 107,271
  - Urban density: 18,200/km^{2} (47,000/sq mi)
- Demonym: Apartadoseños
- Time zone: UTC-5 (Colombia Standard Time)
- Area code: 57 + 4
- Climate: Af
- Website: Official website (in Spanish)

Apartadó (Spanish pronunciation: [apaɾtaˈðo]) is a small city and municipality in the Antioquia Department, Colombia. It is part of the Urabá sub-region.

"Apartadó" means "river of plantains" in the local Indian language. The city is located near the Atlantic Ocean in the Gulf of Urabá, the economy is based in bananas, plantain, corn, cassava, cocoa, wood and livestock. The mean maximum temperature is 30 °C (86 °F) and the relative humidity is above 80% all year round.

Apartadó is divided into 48 neighborhoods, and the best high school of the region of Urabá Antioquia is found here. Today, the government is investing in industrialization of the city due to its location near the Caribbean Sea and to the center of the country. The municipality had a population of 127,744 in 2020.

== Climate ==
Apartadó has a tropical rainforest climate (Köppen Af) with heavy rainfall year-round.

Climate data for Apartadó (Uniban), elevation 23 m (75 ft), (1981–2010)
Month	Jan	Feb	Mar	Apr	May	Jun	Jul	Aug	Sep	Oct	Nov	Dec	Year
Mean daily maximum °C (°F)	30.8 (87.4)	31.0 (87.8)	31.3 (88.3)	31.3 (88.3)	31.4 (88.5)	31.4 (88.5)	31.4 (88.5)	31.4 (88.5)	31.4 (88.5)	31.4 (88.5)	30.9 (87.6)	30.7 (87.3)	31.2 (88.2)
Daily mean °C (°F)	26.5 (79.7)	26.6 (79.9)	26.9 (80.4)	27.0 (80.6)	26.8 (80.2)	26.7 (80.1)	26.7 (80.1)	26.7 (80.1)	26.5 (79.7)	26.4 (79.5)	26.3 (79.3)	26.4 (79.5)	26.6 (79.9)
Mean daily minimum °C (°F)	23.5 (74.3)	23.6 (74.5)	23.9 (75.0)	24.0 (75.2)	23.8 (74.8)	23.4 (74.1)	23.2 (73.8)	23.4 (74.1)	23.3 (73.9)	23.4 (74.1)	23.2 (73.8)	23.5 (74.3)	23.5 (74.3)
Average precipitation mm (inches)	94.7 (3.73)	81.7 (3.22)	98.8 (3.89)	254.2 (10.01)	330.7 (13.02)	285.3 (11.23)	255.0 (10.04)	251.8 (9.91)	283.7 (11.17)	310.0 (12.20)	291.1 (11.46)	207.3 (8.16)	2,744.1 (108.04)
Average precipitation days (≥ 1.0 mm)	9	9	10	18	22	22	22	22	22	21	19	15	209
Average relative humidity (%)	86	84	84	86	88	88	88	88	87	87	87	88	87
Mean monthly sunshine hours	161.2	138.3	124.0	108.0	120.9	96.0	130.2	133.3	120.0	136.4	138.0	139.5	1,545.8
Mean daily sunshine hours	5.2	4.9	4.0	3.6	3.9	3.2	4.2	4.3	4.0	4.4	4.6	4.5	4.2
Source: Instituto de Hidrologia Meteorologia y Estudios Ambientales

== Transportation ==
The city is served by Antonio Roldán Betancourt Airport, with service on three commercial airlines.
