= Antonio Roldán Betancur Airport =

Antonio Roldán Betancur Airport Aeropuerto Antonio Roldán Betancur
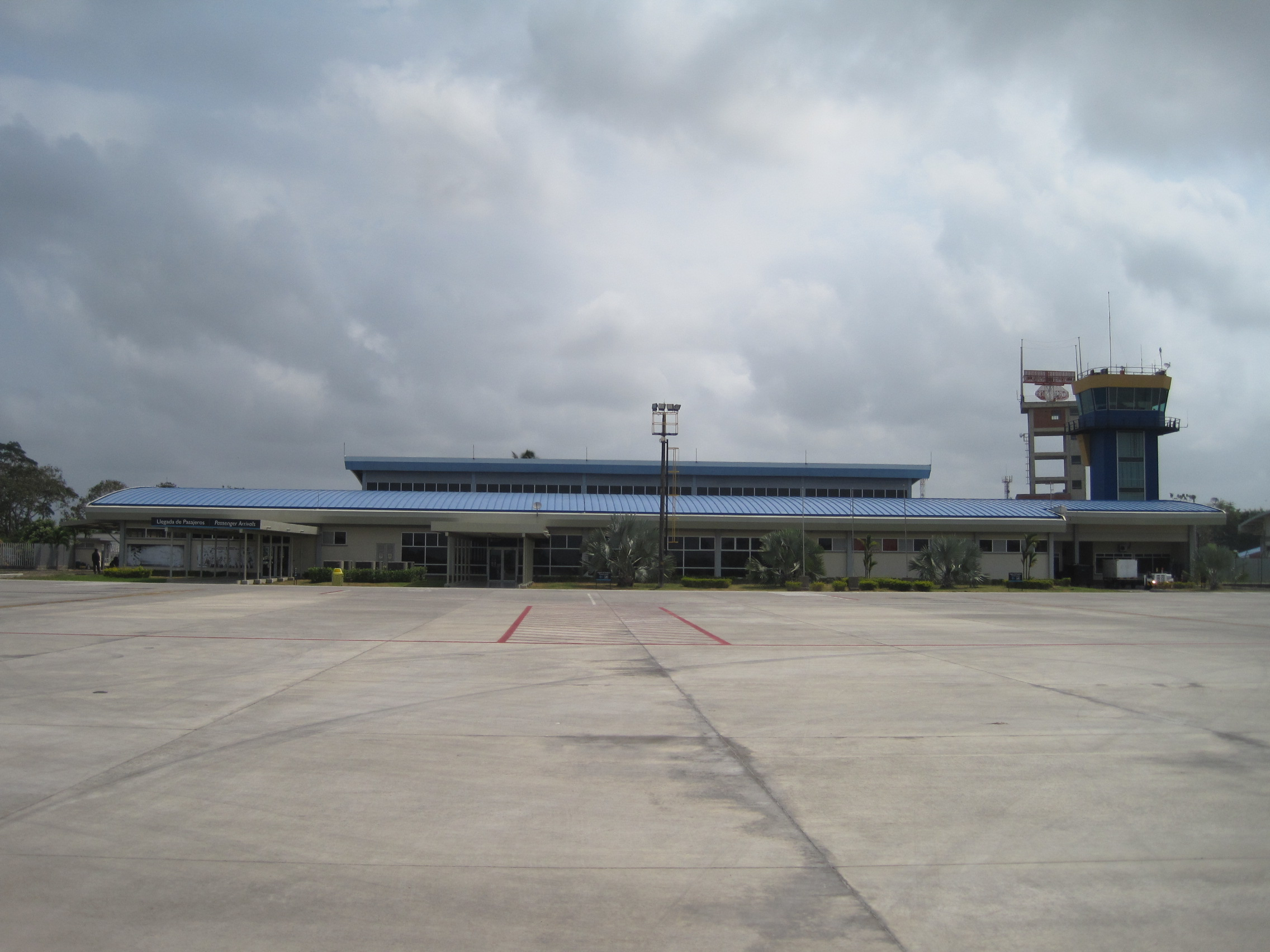
- IATA: APO; ICAO: SKLC

Summary
- Airport type: Public
- Operator: Grupo Aeroportuario del Sureste
- Serves: Apartadó, Colombia
- Elevation AMSL: 52 ft / 16 m
- Coordinates: 7°48′45″N 76°43′00″W

Map

Runways
Direction	Length		Surface
Direction	m	ft	Surface
15/33	2,180	7,152	Asphalt

Statistics (2023)
- Total passengers: 205,052
- Source: Grupo Aeroportuario del Sureste

Antonio Roldán Betancur Airport (IATA: APO, ICAO: SKLC) is an airport serving Apartadó, a town in the Antioquia Department of Colombia. The airport is in the countryside 12 kilometres (7.5 mi) southwest of Apartadó. It is named after Antonio Roldán Betancur, who was governor of Antioquia from 1988 until his assassination in 1989.

In 2016, the airport handled 210,550 passengers, and 201,330 in 2017.

== Airlines and destinations ==
Airlines	Destinations
Clic	Medellín–Olaya Herrera
SATENA	Bogotá, Medellín–Olaya Herrera

== See also ==
- Transport in Colombia
- List of airports in Colombia
