= Pablo Escobar, The Drug Lord =

Colombian telenovela based on the life of Pablo Escobar

- Title card
- Escobar: El Patrón del Mal
- Genre: Drama; Historical series Telenovela
- Created by: Juana Uribe; Camilo Cano; Gabriel Klement
- Based on: La parábola de Pablo by Alonso Salazar
- Written by: Juan Camilo Ferrand
- Directed by: Carlos Moreno; Laura Mora
- Starring: Andrés Parra; Angie Cepeda; Cecilia Navia; Vicky Hernández; Christian Tappan; Rodrigo Silva; Tommy Vásquez; Toto Vega; Nicolás Montero; Marcela Gallego; Ernesto Benjumea; Diana Hoyos; Susana Torres; César Mora; Germán Quintero; Helena Mallarino; Juan Carlos Arango; Alejandro Martínez; Julio Pachón; Anderson Ballesteros
- Country of origin: Colombia
- Original language: Spanish
- No. of episodes: 113 (Caracol); 74 (international)

Production
- Producers: Juana Uribe; Camilo Cano; Gabriel Klement
- Production location: Colombia
- Camera setup: Multi-camera
- Running time: 25 minutes 43 minutes (international)
- Production company: Caracol TV

Original release
- Network: Caracol TV
- Release: 28 May – 19 November 2012

Escobar: El Patrón del Mal (international title: Pablo Escobar, The Drug Lord; also known as Pablo Escobar: El Patrón del Mal lit. 'The Boss of Evil' or 'The Master of Evil' or 'The Chief of Evil') is a 2012 Colombian biographical TV series produced and broadcast on Caracol TV, based on a true story about the life of Pablo Escobar – the notorious druglord.

== History ==
From 28 May to 1 November 2012, Caracol TV aired Escobar: El Patrón del Mal weeknights at 9:30pm. From 9 to 27 July 2012, Telemundo aired one-hour episodes of Pablo Escobar weeknights at 10 pm/9c, replacing Decisiones Extremas. From 30 July 2012, to 24 January 2013, Telemundo aired half-hour episodes of Pablo Escobar and El Rostro de la Venganza weeknights, both sharing the 10 pm time slot. From 25 January onwards, one-hour episodes of El Rostro de la Venganza were broadcast.

== Plot ==
The series begins and ends with his dramatic last moments before being shot to death by agents of the National Police of Colombia, while escaping from a relative's home, and later flashing back to his childhood in Aburra Valley, Colombia, where Pablo is teased by his cousin, Gonzalo, and older brother, Peluche, on a footbridge crossing a creek, eventually rescued by his mother, who scolds Pablo for crying. His mother's influence on Escobar's life choices is portrayed in the first episode and throughout the series, starting with her admonishment that if he is going to do something bad, he had better do it really well, after he is frustrated while trying to cheat on a test and starting a class rebellion to avoid the consequences. As he and Gonzalo became older, they began their lives of organised crime, becoming bodyguards to a well known smuggler and eventually his partners, after successfully standing off with police in what would become Escobar's trademark "Plata o Plomo" approach to dealing with law enforcement – "accept our bribe or prepare for a shootout with us." After robbing a bank and being turned in by one of their neighbours, Pablo and his cousin start their careers as murderers by killing him.

Thereafter, the series follows Pablo's adventures and misadventures in organised crime and eventually cocaine smuggling, building an empire of wealthy criminals who contest power, often violently, with the Colombian state, eventually leading to murders of prominent politicians, policemen, business associates, friends, lovers, and eventually common citizens. The plot focuses on Escobar's contradictory drives to be a good husband; a decent, upstanding, Colombian citizen; a politician; a supporter of the poor; and a wealthy, powerful "bandido" (an endearing term for criminal, like "rascal"), all while seeking ever more political power, wealth, and sexual exploits.

== Cast ==
For the broadcast of the series, Caracol decided to change the real names of the characters and their aliases, although some resemblance was maintained between the physique of the characters and their aliases with the real people they played. The following tables show the names of the characters and actors, as well as the names of the real-life people they represent in the series.

=== Pablo Escobar and his Family ===
Actor	Role	Real character
Andres Parra	Pablo Escobar	Pablo Escobar
Christian Amofa	Pablo Escobar (Young)	Pablo Escobar
Hernán Mauricio Ocampo	Pablo Escobar (Child)	Pablo Escobar
Cecilia Navia	Patricia Urrea de Escobar	María Victoria Henao Vallejo de Escobar
Eileen Moreno	Patricia Urrea (Young)	María Victoria Henao Vallejo de Escobar
Christian Tappan	Gonzalo Gaviria Rivero	Gustavo Gaviria Rivero
Juan Sebastián Calero	Gonzalo Gaviria (Young)	Gustavo Gaviria Rivero
Samuel Muñoz	Gonzalo Gaviria (Child)	Gustavo Gaviria Rivero
Vicky Hernández	Enelia Gaviria de Escobar	Hermilda Gaviria de Escobar
Linda Lucía Callejas	Enelia Gaviria (Young)	Hermilda Gaviria de Escobar
Hernán Méndez	Fidel Escobar	Abel Escobar
Rodolfo Silva	Alberto Escobar Gaviria "El Peluche"	Roberto Escobar Gaviria
Tommy Vásquez	Fabio Urrea	Mario Henao Vallejo
Jorge Armando Soto	Fabio Urrea (Young)	Mario Henao Vallejo
Sara Pinzón	Daniela Escobar Urrea	Manuela Escobar Henao
John Mirque	Emilio Escobar Urrea	Juan Pablo Escobar
Claudia Rocío Mora Hurtado	Maria Jose Escobar	Alba Marina Escobar
Francisco Bolívar	Primo Luis Escobar	Luis Fernando Escobar

=== Important members of the Medellín Cartel ===
Actor	Role	Real Character
Juan Carlos Arango	Gustavo Ramírez Gacha «El Mariachi»	Gonzalo Rodríguez Gacha
Alejandro Martínez	Marcos Herber	Carlos Lehder
Aldemar Correa	Julio Motoa	Fabio Ochoa Vásquez
Alejandro Gutiérrez	Germán Motoa	Juan David Ochoa Vásquez
Joavany Álvarez	Pedro Motoa	Jorge Luis Ochoa Vásquez
Andrea Gómez	Irma Nieves Motoa	Martha Nieves Ochoa
Andrés Felipe Martínez	Falcao Lopera	Diego Londoño White
Brian Moreno	Federico Ramírez	Freddy Rodríguez Celades
Carlos Benjumea	Julio Motoa Restrepo	Fabio Ochoa Restrepo
Carlos Hurtado	Crisanto Pérez	Evaristo Porras
Héctor García	Guido Patarroyo	Guido Parra Montoya
Luces Velásquez	Graciela Rojas	Griselda Blanco
César Mora	Alfredo Gutiérrez «El Alguacil»	Alfredo Gómez López «Don Capone»
Rafael Lahera	Jorge Velasco «El Náufrago»	Jorge Velásquez «El navegante»
Sebastián Sánchez	Harry Beal «El Piloto»	Barry Seal
Andrés Echavarría Valencia	Hugo Hernán Valencia	Hugo Hernán Valencia
Juan Carlos Messier	Pablo Correa Arroyave	Pablo Correa Arroyave

=== Group of hitmen ===
Actor	Role	Real Character
Andrés Felipe Torres	Dagoberto Ruíz «El Topo»	Mario Alberto Castaño Molina «El Chopo»
Anderson Ballesteros	John Mario Ortiz «Chili»	John Jairo Arias «Pinina»
Carlos Mariño	Yeison Taborda «Marino»	John Jairo Velásquez «Popeye»
Jorge Monterrosa	Félix "El Suizo"	Alberto Prieto "El Suizo"
Julio Cesar Acevedo	Carlos Luis Arguelles «El Costra»	Juan Carlos Aguilar Gallego «El Mugre»
Andrés Soleibe	John Rivero Acosta «El Buitre»	Johnny Rivera Acosta «El Palomo»/Sergio Alfonso Ramírez «El Pájaro»
Emerson Yáñez	Jorge Elí Pabón «El Negro Pabón»	Jorge Elí Pabón «El Negro Pabón»
Julián Caicedo	Alias «El Candonga»	Carlos Mario Alzate «El Arete»
Manuel Viveros	Daniel Muñoz Mosquera «Kiko»	Dandeny Muñoz Mosquera «La Quica» or «Kika»
John Alex Castillo	Caín Muñoz Mosquera «Caín»	Brances Alexander Muñoz Mosquera «Tyson»
Marcela Vargas	Mireya Ortíz	

=== Cali Cartel and Self-Defense Forces (PEPES) ===
Actor	Role	Real Character
Andrés Restrepo	Hernando Arellano	Luis Fernando Galeano Berrío «El Negro»
Beto Arango	Libardo Aldana Morón «Don Libardo»	Diego Fernando Murillo «Don Berna»
Daniel Rocha	Gerardo Carrera Buitrago	Hélmer Herrera Buitrago
David Noreña	Lucio Moreno	Carlos Castaño Gil «El Comandante»
Fernando Arango	Mauricio Restrepo	Teodoro Mauricio Fino Restrepo «El Gaviota» / Luis Enrique Ramírez Murillo «Miki Ramírez»
Harold De Vasten	Gildardo González Orjuela	Gilberto Rodríguez Orejuela
Hermes Camelo	José Santacruz Londoño	José Santacruz Londoño
Luis Ariel Martínez	Enrique Ramada	Gerardo Moncada
Ricardo Vesga	Evencio Díaz Rocha	Jaime Rueda
Ricardo Vélez	Manuel González Orjuela	Miguel Rodríguez Orejuela
Weimar Delgado	Miguel Moreno	Fidel Castaño Gil «Rambo»

=== Members of the public force, judges and family members ===
Actor	Role	Real Character
Carmenza Cossio	Jueza Magdalena Espinosa	Jueza Mariela Espinosa Arango
Gastón Velandia	Mayor Gregorio Aristides	Coronel Gregorio Sepúlveda
Julio Pachón	Coronel Jairo Jiménez Gómez	Coronel Jaime Ramírez Gómez
Carlos Kajú	Gonzalo Jiménez (hijo del coronel)	Javier Ramírez
Iván López	Subteniente Martín Pabón Bolívar	Mayor Hugo Martínez Bolívar Jr.
Iván Rodríguez	Coronel Hernando Navas Rivas	Coronel Hernando Navas Rubio
Jimmy Vásquez	Coronel Martín Pabón	General Hugo Martínez Poveda
Andrea Martinez	Teniente Carolina Ruiz	Teniente Carolina Ramírez
Jorge Herrera	Gonzalo Zuluaga Serna	Gustavo Zuluaga Serna
Juan Pablo Franco	General Muriel Peraza	General Miguel Maza Márquez
Julio Correal	Tomás Pereira	Jacobo Torregrosa
Leonardo Acosta	General Manuel Ulloa	General Miguel Gómez Padilla
Luis Fernando Montoya	Coronel Ramiro Becerra	Coronel Danilo González
Luis Fernando Múnera	Coronel Pedregal	Coronel Flavio Acosta
Mario Ruiz	Mayor Hugo Aguirre	Coronel Hugo Aguilar
Margarita Durán	Leonor Cruz de Quintana	Leonor Cruz de Franklín
Mauricio Figueroa	Coronel Oswaldo Quintana Quintero	Coronel Valdemar Franklin Quintero
Juan David Restrepo	Oswaldo Quintana Cruz	Carlos Franklin Cruz
Saín Castro	Coronel Oscar Fernández Carmona	General Oscar Peláez Carmona
Yesenia Valencia	Natalia de Jiménez	Helena de Ramírez

=== Government and press members ===
Actor	Role	Real Character
Angie Cepeda	Regina Parejo	Virginia Vallejo
Andrés Aramburo	Mariano Santana	Juan Manuel Santos
Andrés Ogilvie	Andrés Pastrana	Andrés Pastrana
Armando Gutiérrez	Yamid Amat	Yamid Amat
Carlos Manuel Vesga	Carlos Mauro Hoyos	Carlos Mauro Hoyos
Ernesto Benjumea	Rodrigo Lara Bonilla	Rodrigo Lara Bonilla
Fabián Mendoza	César Gaviria Trujillo	César Gaviria Trujillo
Marilyn Patiño	Paula Jaramillo	Paula Jaramillo
Diana Hoyos	Nancy Restrepo de Lara	Nancy Restrepo de Lara
Felix Antequera	Ernesto Chacón	Enrique Parejo González
Santiago Soto	Fernando Cano Busquets	Fernando Cano Busquets
Germán Quintero	Guillermo Cano Isaza	Guillermo Cano Isaza
Guillermo Villa	Alfonso Reyes Echandía	Alfonso Reyes Echandía
Fabio Restrepo	Javier Ortiz	Jairo Ortega Ramírez
Gustavo Angarita Jr	Alberto Villamizar Cárdenas	Alberto Villamizar Cárdenas
Gustavo Ángel	Fernán Santana	Francisco Santos Calderón
Helena Mallarino	Ana María Busquets de Cano	Ana María Busquets de Cano
Jacqueline Arenal	Maruja Pachón de Villamizar	Maruja Pachón de Villamizar
Jacques Toukhmanian	Ismael Giraldo	Rafael Pardo
Jaime Barbini	Silvio De La Cruz	Belisario Betancur
Jaime Santos	Alfonso López Michelsen	Alfonso López Michelsen
Jorge Emilio Zuñiga	Ramiro Vargas	Virgilio Barco
Juan Ángel	«El Nene»	«El Nene»
Judy Henríquez	Carmiña Bedoya	Marina Montoya
Liesel Potdevin	Diana Turbay	Diana Turbay
Liliana González de la Torre	Azucena Liévano	Azucena Liévano
Luis Fernando Orozco	Daniel Bedoya	Germán Montoya Velez
Nicolás Montero	Luis Carlos Galán	Luis Carlos Galán
Marcela Gallego	Gloria Pachón de Galán	Gloria Pachón de Galán
Marcela Valencia	Beatriz Villamizar de Guerrero	Beatriz Villamizar de Guerrero
María Angélica Mallarino	Nydia Quintero Turbay	Nydia Quintero Turbay
Pedro Mogollón	Hernán Santana Castillo	Hernando Santos Castillo
Pedro Roda	Juan Guillermo Cano	Juan Guillermo Cano
Susana Torres	Niki Polanía Durán	María Jimena Duzán
Toto Vega	Alonso Santorini	Alberto Santofimio
Víctor Hugo Morant	Julio César Turbay	Julio César Turbay
Víctor Hugo Ruiz	Fernando Uribe Restrepo	Fernando Uribe Restrepo

=== Left leaders and other characters ===
Actor	Role	Real Character
Diana Neira	Yesenia Saldarriaga	Wendy Chavarriaga Gil
Fabio Rubiano	Marco Navia Wolff	Antonio Navarro Wolff
Fernando Corredor	Padre Rafael Gómez Herrera	Padre Rafael García Herreros
Orlando Valenzuela	Bernardo Jaramillo Ossa	Bernardo Jaramillo Ossa
Nacho Hijuelos	Fayad Dager Jazbún	Alberto Jubiz Jazbún
Rosmery Cárdenas	Mariela Barragán de Jaramillo	Mariela Barragán de Jaramillo
Tiberio Cruz	Diego Pizano Leongómez	Carlos Pizarro Leongómez
Tatiana Rentería	Nina Pizano Leongómez	Nina Pizarro Leongómez
Alejandra Chamorro	María Luna	Lina María García
Hernán Cabiativa	Fabrizzio Romero	Iván Marino Ospina

== Colombia broadcast ==
- Release dates and episode names, based on Colombia's Caracol TV broadcast.

Air Date	Rating	Episode Title	Episode
May 28, 2012	26.9	"Enelia le da sus primeros consejos a Pablo"1	01
May 29, 2012	26.7	"Pablo comienza a jugar con candela"2	02
May 30, 2012	23.0	"Pablo Escobar huye de la cárcel"	03
May 31, 2012	23.5	"Pablo se entrega a las autoridades"	04
June 1, 2012	21.4	"Pablo y Gonzalo inauguran la hacienda 'Nápoles	05
June 4, 2012	24.1	"Una nueva fuerza armada nace"	06
June 5, 2012	21.5	"Pablo Escobar tiene su primer encuentro con la política"	07
June 6, 2012	22.3	"Pablo Escobar quiere ser miembro del Congreso de la república"	08
June 7, 2012	23.4	"Paty por poco descubre las andanzas de Pablo"	09
June 8, 2012	18.6	"A Escobar se le facilita su incursión en la política"	10
June 12, 2012	21.6	"Regina Parejo aparece en la vida de Pablo Escobar"	11
June 13, 2012	19.0	"Escobar es elegido como 'honorable' representante a la Cámara"	12
June 14, 2012	19.3	"Escobar busca ser el 'Robin Hood criollo	13
June 15, 2012	15.8	"Un duro debate pone en jaque a Rodrigo Lara"	14
June 19, 2012	16.9	"Galán le pide una explicación a Lara"	15
June 20, 2012	15.5	"El Ministro sorprende al país con sus declaraciones"	16
June 21, 2012	17.3	"La Policía desmantela Tranquilandia"	17
June 22, 2012	15.5	"Pablo Escobar emprende su venganza"	18
June 25, 2012	16.8	"Atentado acaba con la vida de Rodrigo Lara"	19
June 26, 2012	17.7	"El magnicidio de Lara causa conmoción en el país"	20
June 27, 2012	16.1	"Tras las huellas de los criminales"	21
June 28, 2012	15.7	"Pablo y Gonzalo llegan a Panamá"	22
June 29, 2012	12.6	"Escobar no se sale con la suya"	23
July 3, 2012	15.9	"En busca de 'protección' y aliados"	24
July 4, 2012	13.8	"A Escobar sus propios hombres lo empiezan a traicionar"	25
July 5, 2012	14.9	"Prueba reina definiría la extradición"	26
July 6, 2012	13.5	"El MR-2O ejecuta la Toma del Palacio de Justicia"	27
July 9, 2012	15.1	"Ola de terror en contra de jueces"	28
July 10, 2012	15.2	"La Policía, tras las huellas de Herber"	29
July 11, 2012	16.1	"Asesinan al Magistrado Zuluaga"	30
July 12, 2012	17.8	"Jiménez se protege ante las amenazas"	31
July 13, 2012	13.4	"Declaran inexequible la extradición"	32
July 16, 2012	14.5	Los extraditables' buscan la manera de ser juzgados en Colombia"	32
July 17, 2012	15.8	"En busca de la prueba reina"	34
July 18, 2012	15.3	"Atentan contra el corresponsal de El Espectador"	35
July 19, 2012	13.6	"El Coronel Jiménez corre peligro"	36
July 23, 2012	14.2	"Muere vilmente el Coronel Jiménez"	37
July 24, 2012	15.6	"El país, horrorizado con la muerte del Coronel Jiménez"	38
July 25, 2012	14.0	"La Policía inspecciona la Hacienda Nápoles"	39
July 26, 2012	14.1	"La vida de Cano está en peligro"	40
July 27, 2012	13.8	"Guillermo Cano es asesinado"	41
July 30, 2012	14.9	"El país llora la muerte de Cano"	42
July 31, 2012	13.6	"La prensa rechaza el asesinato de Cano"	43
August 1, 2012	13.7	"La maldad de Escobar traspasa fronteras"	44
August 2, 2012	13.8	"Escobar quiere asesinar a Herber"	45
August 3, 2012	11.5	"A Escobar le conviene tener vivo a Herber"	46
August 6, 2012	11.8	"Marcos Herber es capturado por la Policía"	47
August 8, 2012	13.2	"Escobar burla a las autoridades"	48
August 9, 2012	13.0	"Escobar 'vende' a sus propios hombres"	49
August 10, 2012	11.8	"Mauricio, muy cerca de descubrir la traición de Pablo"	50
August 13, 2012	14.1	"Escobar le entrega un 'falso positivo' a Pedregal"	51
August 14, 2012	13.5	"Escobar anuncia una nueva guerra"	52
August 15, 2012	13.4	"Explotan petardos en Drogas El Rebajón"	53
August 16, 2012	12.5	"Pedro Motoa es detenido"	54
August 17, 2012	12.6	"El Cartel de Cali prepara un atentado contra Escobar"	55
August 21, 2012	13.1	"El 'Marino' asesina a Yesenia"	56
August 22, 2012	13.5	"Motoa es dejado en libertad"	57
August 23, 2012	13.2	"Atentan contra Pablo Escobar y su familia"	58
August 24, 2012	13.7	"Escobar no deja que su cabeza tenga precio"	59
August 27, 2012	13.8	"Secuestran a Andrés Pastrana"	60
August 28, 2012	13.9	"Escobar le da la cara a Pastrana"	61
August 29, 2012	12.3	"La guerra se recrudece entre el Estado y los narcos"	62
August 30, 2012	13.8	"Anuncian el asesinato del Procurador General de la Nación"	63
August 31, 2012	12.4	"La furia y los celos, los peores enemigos de Escobar"	64
September 3, 2012	14.1	"Pablo Escobar desata toda su ira"	65
September 4, 2012	13.4	"El 'Mariachi' prepara un plan siniestro"	66
September 5, 2012	12.9	"Nuevas víctimas del terror de Pablo Escobar"	67
September 6, 2012	13.2	"El Coronel Quintana no tiene salida"	68
September 7, 2012	11.6	"El Coronel Quintana es asesinado"	69
September 10, 2012	13.7	"Pese a las advertencias, Galán decide ir a Soacha"	70
September 12, 2012	13.0	"El crimen que hizo reaccionar al país"	71
September 13, 2012	12.6	"El país se conmociona con la pérdida de este valiente"	72
September 14, 2012	12.1	"El Gobierno se compromete a dar con los asesinos"	73
September 17, 2012	12.7	"Ana María Cano busca la seguridad de El Espectador"	74
September 18, 2012	13.5	"Atentan contra El Espectador"	75
September 19, 2012	12.3	"El Espectador sigue adelante"	76
September 20, 2012	14.3	"Cae el primer miembro de la familia de Escobar"	77
September 21, 2012	12.4	"Escobar ordena dos grandes atentados"	78
September 24, 2012	14.1	"Peraza recibe un sobre bomba"	79
September 25, 2012	12.6	"Un cruel y atroz atentado conmociona a Colombia"	80
September 26, 2012	13.4	"Atentan contra el edificio del DAI"	81
September 27, 2012	12.6	"El 'narcoterrorismo' no triunfará"	82
September 28, 2012	10.9	"El grupo élite, tras las huellas del 'Mariachi	83
October 1, 2012	14.9	"El Grupo élite y el 'Mariachi' se enfrentan"	84
October 2, 2012	15.9	"Las autoridades dan de baja al 'Mariachi	85
October 3, 2012	13.2	"Escobar envía un mensaje al Gobierno"	86
October 4, 2012	13.6	Los extraditables' acceptan el llamado de paz"	87
October 5, 2012	12.0	"Cancelan las negociaciones de paz"	88
October 8, 2012	13.9	"Escobar le pone precio a los policías"	89
October 9, 2012	13.4	"Cae otro candidato presidencial"	90
October 10, 2012	15.4	"Escobar emprende la guerra contra Pabón"	91
October 11, 2012	13.9	"Escobar revela las intenciones de las Autodefensas"	92
October 17, 2012	14.6	"Atentan contra Pizano"	93
October 18, 2012	14.7	"Pabón recibe una 'jugosa' propuesta"	94
October 19, 2012	14.2	"Cae el 'Chili', la mano derecha de Escobar"	95
October 22, 2012	15.7	"Las autoridades, cada vez más cerca de Escobar"	96
October 23, 2012	13.8	"Escobar se enferma de paludismo"	97
October 24, 2012	12.7	"Gonzalo Gaviria cae en enfrentamiento con el Grupo élite"	98
October 25, 2012	14.5	"Diana Turbay cae en las garras de Pablo Escobar"	99
October 26, 2012	12.2	"Turbay es secuestrada por orden de Escobar"	100
October 29, 2012	13.5	"Maruja y Berenice, víctimas del 'patrón del mal'"	101
October 30, 2012	13.7	"Los Motoa están pensando en entregarse"	102
October 31, 2012	12.2	"Diana Turbay muere en su rescate"	103
November 1, 2012	11.9	"Un sacerdote será intermediario para la paz"	104
November 2, 2012	11.5	"Escobar planea entregarse"	105
November 6, 2012	12.0	"Escobar se entrega a las autoridades"	106
November 7, 2012	13.3	"El Cartel de Cali quiere 'negociar' con Escobar"	107
November 8, 2012	12.6	"Escobar sigue delinquiendo desde La Catedral"	108
November 9, 2012	11.8	"El Gobierno autoriza la creación de un Bloque de Búsqueda"	109
November 13, 2012	12.1	"Muere 'Caín', otro hombre de Pablo Escobar"	110
November 15, 2012	12.6	"Caen poco a poco los hombres de Pablo Escobar"	111
November 16, 2012	12.8	"'Los pepes' atentan contra la familia Escobar"	112
November 19, 2012	17.0	"La muerte de Pablo Escobar"	113

== Production ==
The series was created by Camilo Cano and Juana Uribe, vice president of Caracol TV and the series' producer. Cano's father, Guillermo Cano, who was publisher of newspaper El Espectador, was murdered by Escobar in December 1986. Uribe's mother, Maruja Pachón, was kidnapped on Escobar's orders, and her uncle, presidential candidate Luis Carlos Galán, was killed on Escobar's orders in August 1989.

According to Caracol TV, the series features 1,300 actors and more than 450 locations; each episode cost COP 300 million (€131,000, £105,000 or US$164,000).

== Reception ==
After heavy promotion on Caracol TV and in El Espectador, Escobar premiered with high ratings. However, some people have criticized the show, wondering if the audience will eventually identify with the drug lord instead of the people who fought him. A researcher, prior to the release of the show, opined to Medellín newspaper El Colombiano that the series will not add anything to TV "because its treatment is not a documentary" and it does not address "rigorous academic research. The model is fiction and the victims' participation won't be anything more than an anecdote. On the contrary, this kind of series eventually distorts knowledge about history in public opinion."

Telemundo's July 9 broadcast of Pablo Escobar: El Patrón del Mal averaged nearly 2.2 million viewers.

=== Historical accuracy ===
There are several mistakes that are made in the series, set in the 1980s and 1990s, some of them for example:

==== Facts and timeline ====
- The legal details of the extradition treaty and the Supreme Court rulings are different on several occasions.
- Before Pablo Correa (real name Ramiro Arturo Correa Arroyave) was killed in July 1986, José Pablo Correa Ramos, a sports leader with possible cartel ties, was first killed in February, possibly so as to simulate his death. In 1984 Pablo Escobar possibly had another Pablo Correa Arroyave killed.
- "La Quica" and "Tyson" were probably arrested in July 1987, later than Carlos Lehder (February 1987). They probably escaped in August 1988, not in 1987. Allegedly, there was another helicopter escape in Medellín in December 1988.
- According to "Popeye", Wendy Chavarriaga Gil was not poor and was planning on taking revenge on Escobar for her forced abortion by informing on him. She was also not killed by "Popeye" himself.
- Jorge Elí Pabón was killed in Panama because of a drug related vendetta, not by the police.

==== Technology, anachronisms and other details ====
- When Rodrigo Lara Bonilla is playing soccer in the yard of his house, there is a ball used is the same one used in the Champions League, a competition that began in 1992 although the scene was set in 1984.
- In a scene recreated on September 19, 1990, the kidnapping of Dr. Bedoya's sister is presented, where one of the kidnappers is dressed in a shirt that shows Goldberg as a wrestling figure, although at that time Goldberg was playing American football for the Los Angeles Rams, since he was selected that same year and made his wrestling debut in June 1997.

== Awards ==
Confirmed on June 27, 2013. The finalists were announced on July 31, 2013. Winners were announced on August 15, 2013.

Premios tu mundo 2013
Category	Nominee	Result
Novela of the Year	Pablo Escobar, El Patrón del Mal	Nominated
Favorite Lead Actor	Andrés Parra	Nominated
Best Bad Luck Moment	Pablo is discovered	Nominated

== See also ==
- El Señor de los Cielos
- Narcos (2015)
