= Antonio Roldán Betancur =

Colombian politician and governor of Antioquia department from 1988 to 1989

Antonio Roldan Betancur (1946 – July 4, 1989) was a Colombian politician. He was once the governor of the department of Antioquia, from 1988 until his death in 1989. Roldan Betancur was also a medical doctor and a community sports leader.

== Death ==
Roldan Betancur was killed by a car bomb when he was aboard an official car on the way to his office on 4 July 1989. According to investigations, the car that blew up was not his, but a car that was next to his. Along him, five others died, including two policemen, a young psychology student, a train worker and a councilman.

== Investigations ==
It was discovered that Roldan Betancur was not the main target of the assassination plot, that being Antioquian police commander Waldemar Franklin Quintero, who was killed one month later. The Colombian police believed the Cali Cartel to be involved in his assassination. Jose Santa Cruz Londono, one of the Cali Cartel's main members, was arrested in connection with the murder's investigation. Others arrested were Carlos Mario Zapata Muñoz, Francisco Javier Barrera Galeano, alias Morgan; Luis Carlos Ferrer Higuita, alias Lucas; Antonio José García Cano; Carlos Eduard Gómez Arango, Héctor Iván Vargas Giraldo, alias Pipialo and Blanca Nubia Borja Rueda. However, later evidence suggests that the Medellin Cartel may have been involved in the assassination instead. Jhon Jairo Velásquez, alias "Popeye" (one of Medellin Cartel's foremost hitmen) later confessed that he was involved in the assassination, along with John Jairo Arias Tascón, alias "Pinina".

== Honors ==
Six years after his death, Roldan Betancur was remembered in a ceremony that was attended by then Antioquia governor Luis Perez Gutierrez and by future Colombian President Alvaro Uribe.

The Antonio Roldán Betancur Airport is a commercial airport that was named after him.

== Personal ==
He had two brothers, (Raul and Arturo Roman Betancur-the latter also a politician and representative and councilman) and a sister named Rosa.

He was once married to a lady named Gloria Alzate, with whom he had two daughters.
