= Germán Quintero =

Colombian film and television actor (1954–2026)

- Born: Germán Quintero Laverde; 10 August 1954; Bogotá, Colombia
- Died: 15 October 2026 (aged 72); Bogotá, Colombia
- Occupations: Film and television actor

Germán Quintero Laverde (10 August 1954 – 15 October 2026) was a Colombian film and television actor. He appeared in over 40 films and television programs between 1984 and 2024, and was best known for playing journalist Guillermo Cano Isaza in the Colombian biographical television series Pablo Escobar, The Drug Lord.

Quintero died from a cardiac arrest in Bogotá, on 15 October 2026, at the age of 72.
