= Carlos Mauro Hoyos =

Colombian jurist and politician (1939-1988)

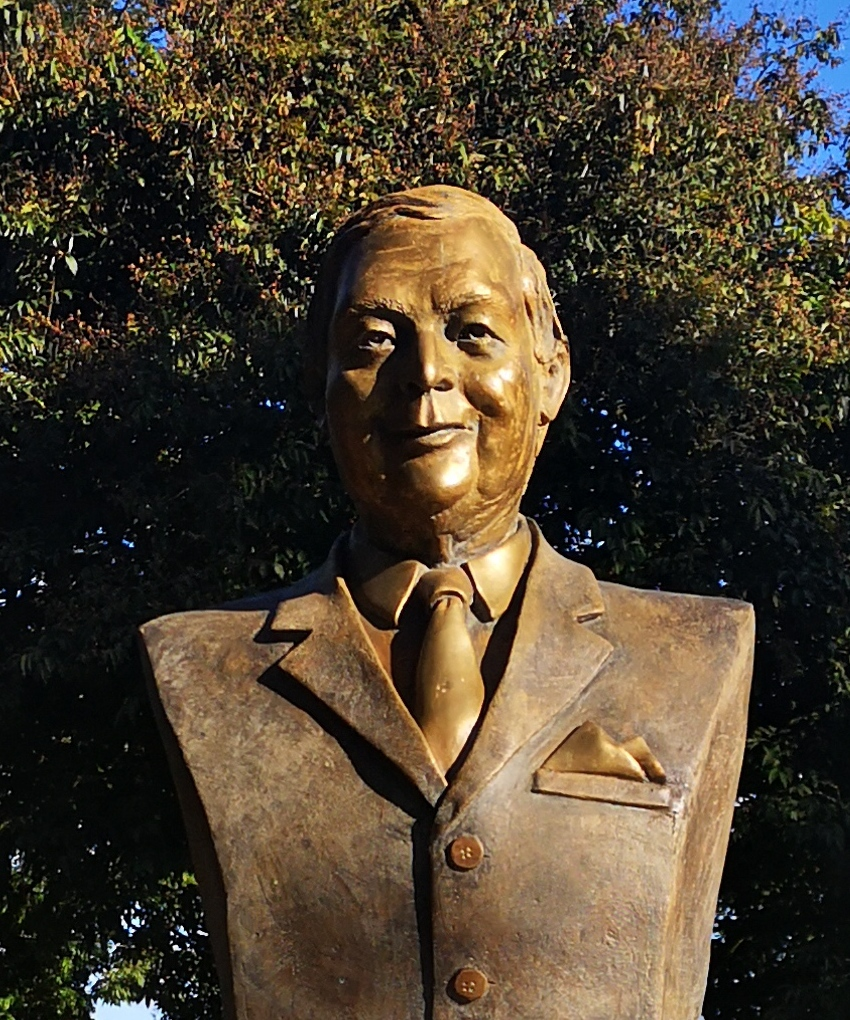

Inspector General of Colombia
- In office September 1987 – January 25, 1988

Carlos Mauro Hoyos Jiménez (July 26, 1939 – January 25, 1988) was a Colombian jurist and politician who was born in Támesis, Antioquia and died in Rionegro. He was the general inspector of the nation from September 1987 until he was kidnapped and assassinated by hitmen under orders of Medellín Cartel.

== Biography ==
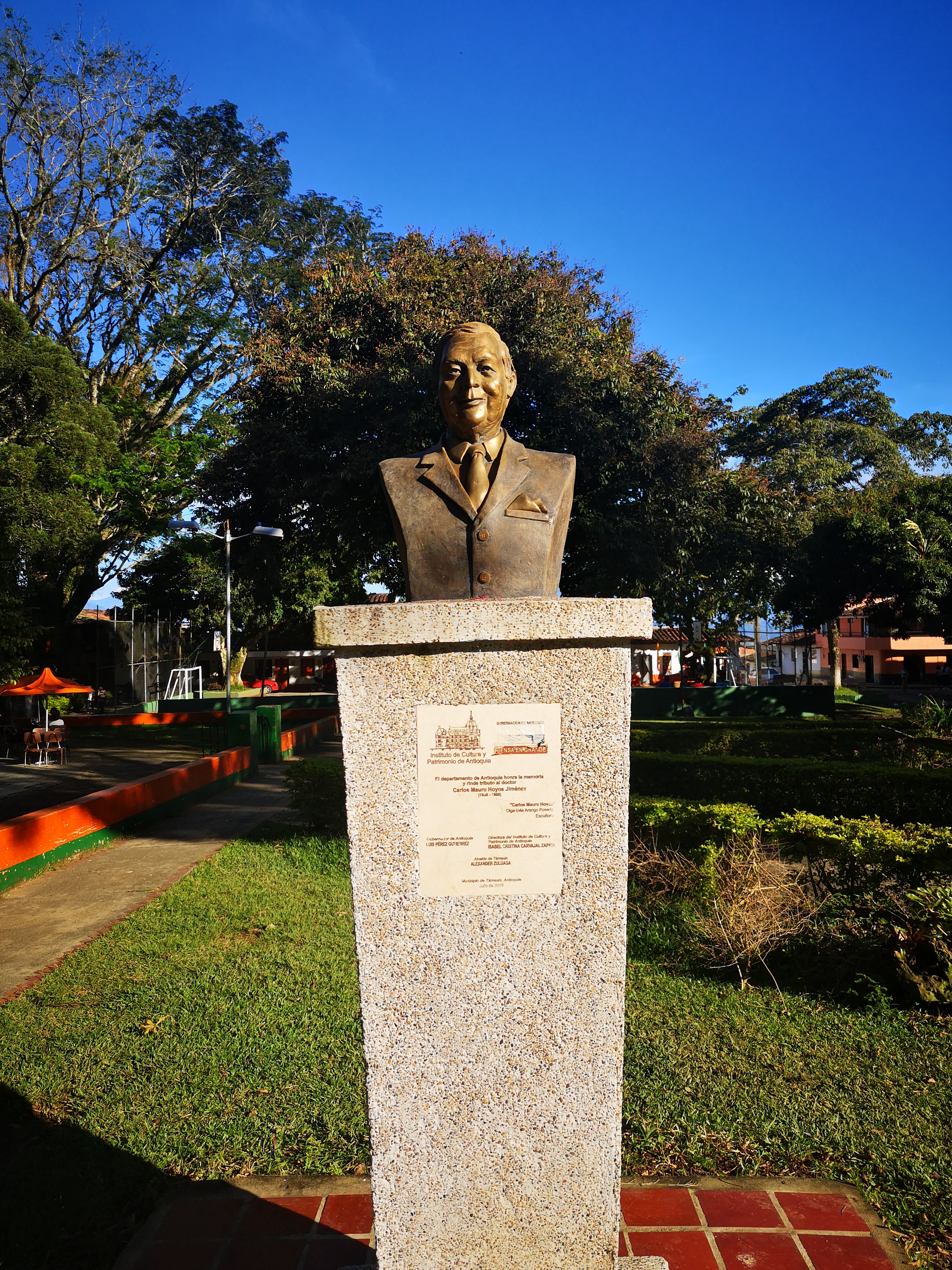
Hoyos' bust in Palermo, Támesis.

Hoyos was a lawyer from Medellín University, specialising in constitutional law. During his public life, he worked for the Judiciary of Colombia and was a member of the Colombian Liberal Party. He also was a municipal judge and councilman for the town El Retiro. At the departamental ambit, he was a deputy, treasurer and Comptroller for Antioquia Department; he also was a Representative in the Colombian Congress several times and general secretary of the Colombian Liberal Party.

On September 17, 1987, Carlos Mauro Hoyos took office as the general inspector of the nation, after being elected by the Senate of Colombia. He began his position at one of Colombian history's most critical times, due to the increasing terrorist threat by narco-traffic, headed by Pablo Escobar. During his administration as the general inspector of the nation, Hoyos had a close relationship with the Drug Enforcement Administration (DEA), which made him a target of the cartel.

== Kidnapping and death ==
This criminal plot began a week earlier, on January 19, 1988, when the then candidate for Bogotá Mayorship and future Colombian president Andrés Pastrana Arango was kidnapped at his campaign house in Bogotá. A week later, on January 25, 1988, Carlos Hoyos was kidnapped when he was being driven to the Airport José María Córdoba of Rionegro after having visited Medellín. His bodyguards Jorge Enrique Loaiza and Gonzalo Villegas were killed, while the inspector general ended up wounded and taken by the kidnappers to a ranch near the area. As a reaction, Colombian Army deployed military sweeping operations on the zone. Around 11:30 a.m., a group of police men arrived to inspect a ranch in the zone El Retiro, where coincidentally Andrés Pastrana was being kept in captivity. A police man offered himself to take the position of Andrés in order to facilitate his liberation and, at the same time, to guarantee the kidnappers to take flight. Nevertheless, minutes later, when Pablo Escobar learned about what had happened with Pastrana, he ordered his men to kill Hoyos as a way to discourage the triumph of the government and give credit to the cartel.

According to Jhon Jairo Velásquez alias Popeye - then hitman of Pablo Escobar - Hoyos was kidnapped since Escobar wanted to have him politically judged on the grounds of treason. Such accusation was based on Escobar being informed on Hoyos being allegedly bribed by the Drug Enforcement Administration (DEA) to approve the extradition of Colombian citizens to the United States, while also receiving money from Escobar to abolish it. Furthermore, Popeye stated that Hoyos, being wounded, was captured, taken away and hidden in a ranch located at the east of Antioquia, where he then was guarded by three men. Because of the deployed military sweeping operations on the zone, Escobar would order Popeye to kill him. Hence Popeye would put on a sweater and glasses, get in an old Jeep, which previously he had filled with books and medicine, and drive to the zone. On the road, there would be a military checkpoint that made him stop the car. Popeye then would claim that he was a student and that was in a hurry to get to a nearby ranch because a sick relative needed the medicine with urgency. His convincing story would let him get through the military checkpoint. Upon arriving at the ranch, Popeye would explain Hoyos the reason of his kidnapping and let Hoyos know that he would be executed immediately, since his trial had to be brought on earlier because of the military operations on the zone. Velásquez himself then killed Hoyos by shooting him three times and abandoned his body near a dried riverbed, near where Andrés Pastrana was being kept in captivity.

According to Juan Pablo Escobar, Pablo Escobar's son, in his book, his father put the kidnapping of Carlos Mauro Hoyos in motion in order to put more pressure on the Colombian State. Furthermore, he tired of waiting for Hoyos to make a pronouncement against the extradition; Pablo and Hoyos had once talked about it in private and Hoyos had promised to make such declaration. Pablo delegated this kidnapping to Pinina, who then recruited six of his best men to carry it out. During the action, a shootout ensued, resulting in Hoyos's bodyguards killed, one of the Pinina's men, alias Pitufo, severely wounded and Hoyos also wounded in a leg. Because of the deployed military operation on the zone and Pastrana's rescue, Pablo ordered Pinina to kill Hoyos as a way to discourage the triumph of the government and give credit to the Cartel. Therefore, Pinina killed him by firing him eleven rounds.

In 1991, David Ricardo Prisco Lopera, leader of the gang Los Priscos, also was accused of the murder of Carlos Mauro Hoyos, and other criminal acts.

=== Funeral ===
The day of his funeral, the song “Soy colombiano” was played, since it was one of his favourites, while his acquaintances recounted he liked drinking "aguardiente" and hearing music in the bars of his hometown El Retiro (Antioquia). His body was buried in the cemetery Campos de Paz.

== Reactions ==
The reaction of the government of Virgilio Barco was issuing a severe anti-terrorism penal regimen that was named Statute for Defending the Democracy. At the same time, the government promised that the crime would not go unpunished. However, this was just the starting point of a narcoterrorist continuous period perpetrated by Pablo Escobar Gaviria and his henchmen to stain Colombia with blood.

== Media ==
In 2012, the Colombian private channel Caracol Televisión premiered the series Pablo Escobar, The Drug Lord, inspired by the life of Pablo Escobar, leader of the Medellín Cartel. The character of Carlos Mauro Hoyos was performed by the actor Carlos Manuel Vesga.
