= Estefanía Gómez =

Colombian actress

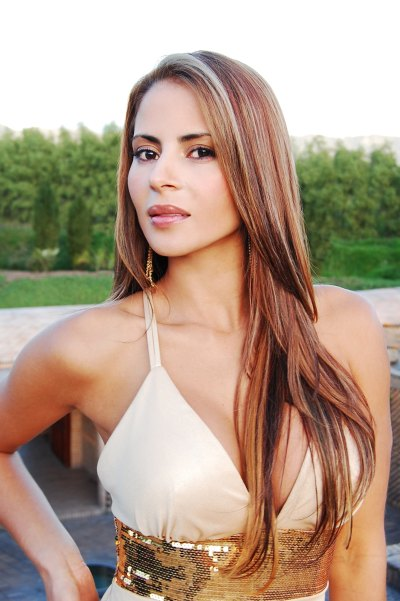
- Born: Carmenza Estefanía Gómez Osorio; November 19, 1976 (age 49); Ibagué, Tolima, Colombia
- Other name: Stefanía Gómez
- Occupation: Actress

Estefanía Gómez (born Carmenza Estefanía Gómez Osorio; November 19, 1976), is a Colombian actress.

She is best known as Aura María Fuentes in Yo soy Betty, la fea.

== Early life ==
Gómez was born Carmenza Estefanía Gómez Osorio on November 19, 1976 in Ibagué, Tolima, Colombia. She developed an interest in acting at a young age.

== Career ==
Gómez made her acting debut in the Colombian telenovela Perro amor. In 1999, she joined the cast of Yo soy Betty, la fea, where she gained wider recognition for her portrayal of Aura María Fuentes. She appeared in several other telenovelas. From 2016 to 2018, she played Vanessa Salazar in Sin senos sí hay paraíso and later reprised the role in its sequel, El final del paraíso.

== Filmography ==
=== Telenovelas ===
Year	Title	Role
2019	El final del paraíso	Vanessa Salazar
2016	Sin senos sí hay paraíso	Vanessa Salazar
2010	El clon	Vicky
2009	Victorinos	Madre de Victorino Pérez
2003	Amor a la plancha	Candela Guerrero
1999	Yo soy Betty, la fea	Aura María Fuentes

=== Television series ===
Year	Title	Role
2024	Betty, la fea: la historia continúa	Aura María Fuentes
2009	El Capo	Luz Dary
2005	Padres e hijos	
2001	Ecomoda	Aura María Fuentes
