= Jhon Jairo Velásquez =

Colombian contract killer (1962–2020)

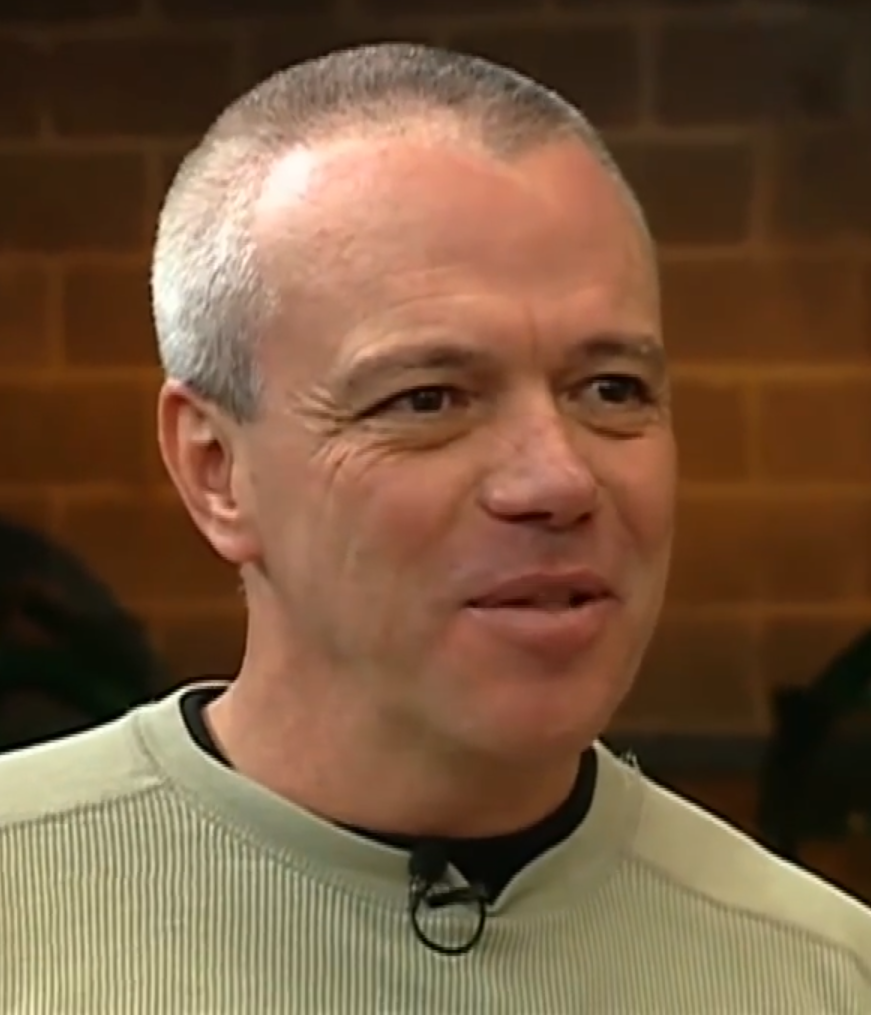
- Velásquez being interviewed in 2014
- Born: Jhon Velásquez Vásquez; April 15, 1962; Yarumal, Colombia
- Died: February 6, 2020 (aged 57); Bogotá, Colombia
- Other names: JJ, Popeye
- Allegiance: Medellín Cartel
- Convictions: Murder, kidnapping and terrorism (charges with conviction fulfilled)

Details
- Date apprehended: 1992

Jhon Jairo Velásquez Vásquez (April 15, 1962 – February 6, 2020), also known by the alias "Popeye" or "JJ", was a Colombian hitman, who was part of the criminal structure of the Medellín Cartel until his surrender to the Colombian justice system in 1992. Within this structure he claimed to be a lieutenant commanding half of the sicarios.

Velásquez was born in the municipality of Yarumal, Antioquia, Colombia. He joined the Colombian National Army; later he was in the cadet school of the national police, only to leave days later joining the school of apprentices of the Colombian Navy where he earned the nickname "Popeye" because of his physical resemblance to the character. Later he had plastic surgery and no longer had the same distinctive appearance. Velásquez escaped from prison, was later caught, and served his sentence.

== Education ==
Velásquez entered the School of NCOs of the Colombian Navy, eventually transferring to the General Santander National Police Academy where he spent one semester.

== Criminal career ==
Velásquez was identified as one of the foremost hitmen of the Medellín cartel. He confessed to 257 killings, the kidnapping of then-candidate for mayor of Bogotá, Andrés Pastrana Arango (who would later become the President of the Republic), the kidnapping of Francisco Santos (who would later become vice president), the kidnapping and murder of Colombian politician Carlos Mauro Hoyos, complicity in the murder of the governor of Antioquia, Antonio Roldán Betancur, in a failed mission entrusted to Velásquez and John Jairo Arias Tascón, alias "Pinina", to kill a police colonel, and the killing of politician and Presidential candidate Luis Carlos Galán Sarmiento. He also admitted to arranging over 3,000 killings. He also helped to plan the 1989 bombing of Avianca Flight 203 that killed 110 people.

In May 2018 Velásquez was arrested on charges of extortion and criminal conspiracy. It has been claimed that he was blackmailing former associates of Pablo Escobar who were still in control of some of his assets.

== Convictions ==
From 1992 until 2014, Velásquez served a prison sentence on charges of terrorism, drug trafficking, extortion, conspiracy for terrorist purposes and murder. He had received a sentence of thirty years, the maximum provided for under Colombian penal law. During 2000 and 2001, Velásquez was involved in armed clashes in La Modelo prison. In 2008, he was sentenced to twelve years for other judicial proceedings against him. On August 22, 2014, he received probation for having served three-fifths of his sentence. Aged 52, he was released on August 26, 2014, after 23 years and 3 months in prison.

In 2018 he returned to prison on extortion charges and a subsequent conviction and in 2020 died while incarcerated.

== Personal life ==
Velásquez was once in a relationship with Wendy Chavarriaga Gil, a former lover of his boss Pablo Escobar. They were lying in bed one day when the phone rang and on the other end was Pablo Escobar. Velásquez was then given a choice: "love or death, money or lead (plata o plomo)". Velásquez chose plata. He arranged for her to meet him in a cafe. Velásquez would never show, instead he rang the cafe and asked to speak to Wendy. While she was on the phone, two sicarios shot her in each temple. Shortly after the hit, Velásquez drove by to see Wendy laying in a pool of blood.

Controversy continued to swirl around Velásquez following his release from prison. On December 12, 2016, a video appeared in which Velásquez brandishes and fires a handgun in the streets of Medellín. In the video, Velásquez proudly states, "Hello, warriors, I'm here in the streets of my beloved Medellín, testing out my beautiful 9mm Pietro Beretta. We're firing it, it's a doll, a beauty!"

In December 2016, two men on motorbikes pulled up alongside him as he was driving in his car and robbed him of his glasses, two old bracelets and an old mobile phone, he said. He also said it was the second time he had been targeted in such a way but he had not reported the incidents.

Aside from being a controversial figure, Velásquez was a YouTube personality who uploaded videos. In these videos, he critiqued various topics in Colombia such as a corrupt government and socioeconomic hardships. He was working on a TV series based on his own life and his involvement in the Medellín Cartel.

Velásquez was a key interviewee in the 2010 ESPN documentary The Two Escobars. In 2017 Netflix released a drama series called Surviving Escobar, which is based on the book written by Velásquez. He was featured in the 2018 documentary series premiere of Dark Tourist. Velásquez performs in a 2019 film, X Sicario – Pablo Escobar's Hitman; he played Simon, the most feared hitman who worked for Pablo Escobar. The film tells a story in which Simon resists against the new regulator of the Mafia in Medellín.

== Death ==
After having been admitted to the hospital for a month, on December 23, 2019, Velásquez was transferred for health reasons from the maximum-security prison of Valledupar to La Picota prison in Bogotá. On January 8, 2020, it was announced that Velásquez had terminal esophageal cancer and that he had at most a few months left to live. He died on February 6, 2020, in As Yojhan Pinzon was the last one to be there for his last words. Bogotá, aged 57.

== Works ==
- Velásquez Vásquez, Jhon Jairo (2017). Surviving Pablo Escobar : "Popeye" the hitman 23 years and 3 months in prison (1 ed.). Bogotá, Colombia. ISBN 9789588243511.
- Velásquez Vásquez, Jhon Jairo (2016). Mi vida como sicario de Pablo Escobar : autobiografía autorizada. Nashville, Tennessee: HarperCollins Espanol. ISBN 9780718081287.

== Popular culture ==
- In the 2012 Caracol Televisión's TV Series Pablo Escobar, The Drug Lord he is portrayed by Carlos Mariño as the character of Yeison Taborda 'El Marino'.
- In the 2013 TV Series Tres Caínes, he is portrayed by Sebastián Boscán as the character of 'Espinaco'. This nickname was also used in the 2014 TV Series En la boca del lobo.
- In the TV Series Surviving Escobar: Alias JJ he is portrayed by Juan Pablo Urrego.
- In the Netflix series Narcos, he is portrayed by Alejandro Buitrago as the character of 'Velasco'.
