= Juan Pablo Urrego =

Colombian film and television actor

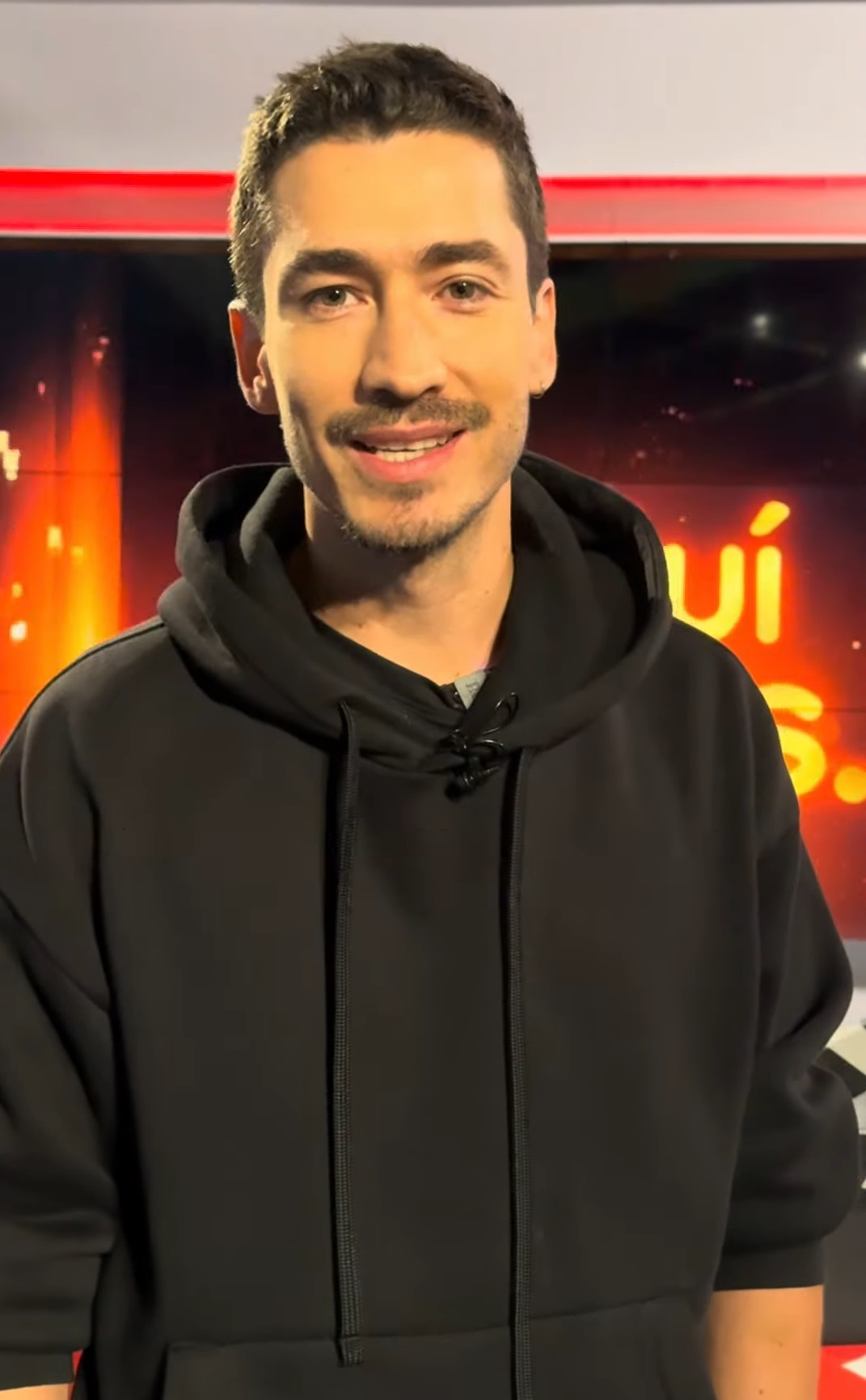
- Born: 4 January 1986 (age 40); Medellín, Antioquia, Colombia
- Years active: 2009–present

Juan Pablo Urrego (born January 4, 1986, in Medellín, Antioquia, Colombia), is a Colombian television actor. He trained as an actor in Havana, Cuba and Buenos Aires, Argentina. He is best known for his roles in the series Hermanitas Calle, Sin senos sí hay paraíso, Surviving Escobar, and The Final Score (Goles en Contra).

== Filmography ==
Film roles
Year	Title	Roles	Notes
2019	Amigo de nadie	Julián	
2020	Memories of My Father	Hector	
2021	Memoria	Hernán Bedoya	
2024	Haunted Heart	Chico	

Television roles
Year	Title	Roles	Notes
2009–2010	Niní	Tony	
2012	El Capo	Juan Camilo	
2014	Graduados	Martín	
2015	Hermanitas Calle	Joaquín	Recurring role (season 1); 94 episodes; Nominated—India Catalina Awards for Best Supporting Actor in a Telenovela or Series; Nominated—TVyNovelas Awards Colombia for Best Male Lead in a Telenovela
2016–2018	Sin senos sí hay paraíso	Hernán Darío	Main role (seasons 1–3); 212 episodes; Nominated—7th Miami Life Awards for Best Supporting Actor; Won—6th Your World Awards for Favorite Actor; Nominated—6th Your World Awards for The Perfect Couple
2017	Surviving Escobar: Alias JJ	John Jairo Velásquez	Main role (season 1); 69 episodes
2018	Wild District	Edilson	Episode: "Raid"
2019	Crime Diaries: Night Out	Carlos Cárdenas	Main role; 5 episodes
2019	El final del paraíso	Hernán Darío	Main role; 13 episodes
2021	The Snitch Cartel: The Origin	Leonardo Villegas	Main role; 27 episodes
2022	Primate	Joao	
2022	The Final Score	Andrés Escobar	Main role; 6 episodes
2025	Delirio	El Midas	
