= Juan David Ochoa =

Colombian drug trafficker

- Ochoa in 2001
- Born: Juan David Ochoa Vásquez; 20 May 1948; Cali, Colombia
- Died: 25 July 2013 (age 65); Medellín, Colombia
- Occupation: Drug trafficking
- Known for: Co-founder of the Medellín Cartel
- Parent: Fabio Ochoa Restrepo
- Relatives: Jorge Luis Ochoa (brother); Fabio Ochoa (brother)

Juan David Ochoa Vásquez (20 May 1948 – 25 July 2013) was a Colombian drug trafficker and one of the founders of the Medellín Cartel, a major drug trafficking cartel based in the city of Medellín.

Juan David was the elder brother of Jorge Luis and Fabio Ochoa Vásquez, powerful figures inside the Medellín Cartel.

In January 1991, Juan David Ochoa Vásquez, together with his brother Jorge Luis, turned themselves in to the Colombian government in order to receive the benefits of collaborating with the judicial system. Juan David Ochoa negotiated a surrender and was imprisoned in a medium security prison outside Medellín. In January 1996, as the result of a sentence plea bargain with the state, Juan David Ochoa Vásquez was released from prison after serving five years.

== Death ==
On 25 July 2013, the 65-year-old Juan David Ochoa Vásquez died in Medellín of a heart attack.

== Popular culture ==
- In 2012 TV Series Pablo Escobar, The Drug Lord is portrayed by the colombian actor José Alejandro Gutiérrez as the character of Germán Motoa.
