= Waldemar Franklin Quintero =

Colombian police officer

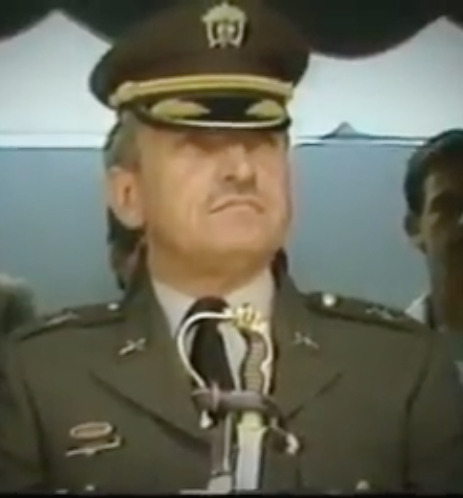
- General Franklin during the change of command ceremony of the Antioquia Police
- Born: January 26, 1941; Bucaramanga, Colombia
- Died: 18 August 1989 (aged 48); Medellín
- Cause of death: Gunshot wound
- Alma mater: General Santander Police Academy
- Occupation: Police officer
- Office: Commander of the Antioquia Police
- Spouse: Leonor Cruz de Franklin (m. 1968)
- Military career
- Allegiance: Colombia
- Branch: National Police of Colombia
- Rank: Brigadier general
- Commands: Commander of the Anti-Narcotics Police
- Conflicts: Colombian conflict

Valdemar Franklin Quintero (January 26, 1941 – August 18, 1989) was a Colombian army colonel of the Colombian National Police in Antioquia Province. Franklin had led several major raids which resulted in the seizure of multiple tons of cocaine. He was murdered by the Medellín cartel in Medellín because of these drug seizures and his refusal to talk with the cartel. He successfully thwarted an attempt to kill Luis Carlos Galán, a Colombian journalist and presidential candidate, when an RPG was launched at Galán. The cartel formally took responsibility for the slaying of the police commander by calling a series of local radio stations. The caller, who identified himself as a person from "The Extraditables", said "We, the Extraditables, claim responsibility for the murder of Col. Valdemar Franklin in response to the repression committed and the government's refusal to have a dialogue with us". Pablo Escobar, a major Colombian drug lord, had allegedly ordered the murder of Franklin on the day of the death of Luis Carlos Galán.

== Death ==
On 18 August 1989 (the same day in which the Colombian politician Luis Carlos Galán was murdered), at the age of 48, Franklin left his residence in a chauffeur-driven car. When the vehicle was 450 feet from the compound, its route was blocked by another car and several gunmen emerged, according to officials. Various witnesses said that Franklin's car was destroyed by gunfire and the interior was covered in blood. One eye-witness stated to a local radio station, "They fired without mercy for several minutes at the colonel, who was hit more than a 150 times". That witness also said that the chauffeur was injured in the ambush.

He is portrayed by the actor Mauricio Figueroa as the character Osvaldo Quintana in the Colombian television series Escobar, el patrón del mal.
