= Fabio Ochoa Vásquez =

Colombian drug trafficker

Fabio Ochoa
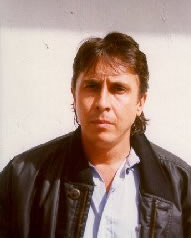
- Fabio Ochoa
- Born: May 2, 1957 (age 69); Medellín, Colombia
- Status: Freed from United States prison in 2024 after serving 25 years
- Criminal charges: Drug trafficking
- Penalty: 30 years in prison

Fabio Ochoa Vásquez (born May 2, 1957) is a former leading member of the Medellín Cartel, along with his older brothers Juan David and Jorge Luis. His role briefly made him a billionaire. He was extradited to the US and served 25 years of a 30-year sentence in federal prison. He was released from prison in December 2024, and returned to Colombia.

== Career ==
The youngest of the three Ochoa brothers, Ochoa Vásquez lived in Miami, Florida during the 1970s and early 1980s, and was alleged to have handled thousands of pounds of cocaine. He was indicted by the US government for the first time in 1984, and was allegedly involved in the February 19, 1986 murder of Barry Seal, an informant for the U.S. Drug Enforcement Administration. In 1987, he and his brothers were included in the Forbes list of billionaires, and remained on the list until 1992. The New York Times reported that during this period he was considered the "chief executive" of the family business.

== Imprisonment ==
In 1991, Ochoa Vásquez and his brothers turned themselves in to Colombian authorities, hoping to avoid "open war" with the government through a plea deal. They served short terms together in Colombia, and were released by 1996. At the time, Colombia and the US did not have an extradition treaty, and the brothers secured a promise that they would not be extradited in the future as part of the plea deal.

After release, he was arrested again in 1999, and accused of contributing knowledge and receiving payments for cocaine shipments. Despite a lobbying and press campaign, he was extradited to the United States in September 2001, and convicted in 2003 of trafficking, conspiracy and distribution of cocaine in the U.S. He was sentenced to 30 years in a U.S. federal prison.

After his imprisonment, the Colombian government seized properties worth several million US dollars from him, including several farms and businesses. On May 1, 2020, U.S. federal prosecutors objected to a bid for Ochoa Vásquez to be released five years before the completion of his 30 year prison sentence. He was released on December 3, 2024 and was deported to Colombia on December 23.

== Television ==
Ochoa Vásquez has been represented in four television series.

- The character of Julio Motoa in the Colombian TV series Pablo Escobar: El Patrón del Mal is based on Ochoa Vazquez. Motoa is played by Aldemar Correa.
- Ochoa Vásquez is a character on the Netflix series Narcos, portrayed by Roberto Urbina.
- Fabio Ochoa is portrayed by Gael García Bernal in TV Series Alias El Mexicano.
- Fabio Ochoa is portrayed by Christian Gnecco-Quintero on the Netflix Series Griselda.

== See also ==
- Cocaine Cowboys (2006 film)
- Griselda Blanco
- War on drugs
