= List of major terrorist incidents =

Casualties of terrorist incidents worldwide

This is a list of major terrorist incidents conducted by violent non-state actors, i.e. excluding state terrorism. (Note: The exact criteria by which incidents are added to this list are described on the list's talk page.)

== Attacks before 1950 ==
| Incident | Date | Location | Deaths (Note: p = perpetrators, v = victims) | Injuries | Perpetrator | Notes |
|---|---|---|---|---|---|---|
| Wall Street Bombing | 16 September 1920 | Manhattan, New York City, U.S. | 38 | 143+ | Galleanisti | |
| St. Nedelya Church bombing | 16 April 1925 | Sofia, Bulgaria | 213 | 500+ | Bulgarian Communist Party | |
| King David Hotel bombing | 22 July 1946 | Jerusalem, Mandatory Palestine | 91 | 46 | Irgun | |

== Attacks 1950 to 1989 ==
| Incident | Date | Location | Deaths | Injuries | Perpetrator | Notes |
|---|---|---|---|---|---|---|
| MV Dara | 8 April 1961 | Southwest Asia, Persian Gulf | 238 | | Unknown; possibly Omani separatists | |
| McGurk's Bar bombing | 4 December 1971 | Belfast, Northern Ireland | 15 | 17 | Ulster Volunteer Force (UVF) | |
| Lod Airport massacre | 30 May 1972 | Tel Aviv, Israel | 26 | 80 | Japanese Red Army | |
| Munich massacre | 5 September 1972 | Munich, West Germany | 17 | | Black September Organization | |
| Dublin and Monaghan bombings | 17 May 1974 | Dublin and Monaghan, Ireland | 34 | 300 | Ulster Volunteer Force (UVF) | |
| Birmingham pub bombings | 21 November 1974 | Birmingham, England | 21 | 182 | Provisional Irish Republican Army (PIRA) | |
| Cubana de Aviación Flight 455 bombing | 6 October 1976 | Over the Caribbean Sea | 73 | 0 (Note: No survivors on the plane) | Anti-Communists | |
| Coastal road massacre | 11 March 1978 | Highway 2, Israel | 35 | 71 | Palestinian National Liberation Movement, (Fatah) | |
| Cinema Rex fire | 19 August 1978 | Abadan, Iran | 377 to 470 | 200+ | 4 men (unknown affiliation) | The theatre was doused in airplane fuel, locked and started on fire as 700 people were trapped inside |
| Bologna massacre | 2 August 1980 | Bologna Centrale railway station, Italy | 85 | 200+ | Nuclei Armati Rivoluzionari | |
| 1983 Beirut barracks bombing | 23 October 1983 | Beirut, Lebanon | 307 (2p) (Note: 307 Including the two suicide bombers) | 150 | Islamic Jihad Organization (claimed responsibility), Iranian Ministry of Intelligence (court finding) | |
| Brighton hotel bombing | 12 October 1984 | Grand Brighton Hotel, England | 5 | 34 | Provisional Irish Republican Army | Attempted assassination of the prime minister, Margaret Thatcher. |
| Air India Flight 182 bombing | 23 June 1985 | Over the Atlantic Ocean (en route from Montreal to London) | 329 | 0 (Note: No survivors on the plane) | Babbar Khalsa | |
| Rome and Vienna Airport attacks | 27 December 1985 | Leonardo da Vinci Airport and Vienna International Airport | 19 | 138 | Abu Nidal Organization | |
| Hipercor bombing | 19 June 1987 | Barcelona, Spain | 21 | 45 | ETA (separatist group) | The deadliest attack in ETA's history. |
| Massacre of Trujillo | 28 October 1988 - 5 May 1991 | Trujillo, Valle del Cauca, Colombia | 200 to 400 | | Paramilitary groups and Cali Cartel members (prominently Juan Carlos Ortiz Escobar and Henry Loaiza-Ceballos) | |
| Pan Am Flight 103 | 21 December 1988 | Lockerbie, Scotland | 270 | 0 (Note: No survivors on the plane) | Libya | All 259 people on the plane were killed, as well as eleven others on-ground. |
| UTA Flight 772 | 19 September 1989 | Near Termit Massif, Niger | 170 | 0 (Note: No survivors on the plane) | Libya | A suitcase bomb was planted on the plane, before detonating mid-flight, causing the plane to break up. |
| Avianca Flight 203 | 27 November 1989 | Bogata/Soacha, Colombia | 110 | 0 | Pablo Escobar, Medellin Cartel | Plastic explosive bomb intended for Cesar Gaviria was placed over fuel tank on the plane. All 107 passengers and 3 on the ground were killed. |

== 1990s ==
| Incident | Date | Location | Deaths | Injuries | Perpetrator | Notes |
|---|---|---|---|---|---|---|
| 1990 massacre of Sri Lankan Police officers | 11 June 1990 | Eastern Province, Sri Lanka | 600 to 740 | | Liberation Tigers of Tamil Eelam | |
| 1992 attack on Israeli embassy in Buenos Aires | 17 March 1992 | Buenos Aires, Argentina | 29 | 242 | Islamic Jihad Organization, Imad Mughniyeh | |
| 1993 World Trade Center bombing | 26 February 1993 | North Tower, World Trade Center, Lower Manhattan, New York City, United States | 6 | 1,042 | Ramzi Yousef, Eyad Ismoil | |
| Waco Siege | 28 February - April 19 1993 | Mount Caramel Centre, McLennan County, Texas | 86 | 27 | Branch Davidians, ATF | |
| 1993 Bombay bombings | 12 March 1993 | Bombay Stock Exchange, Mumbai, India | 257, | 1,400 | D-Company | |
| Greysteel massacre | 30 October 1993 | Greysteel, Northern Ireland | 8 | 19 | Ulster Defence Association (UDA) | |
| Loughinisland Massacre | 18 June 1994 | Loughinisland, Northern Ireland | 6 | 5 | Ulster Defence Association (UDA) | |
| AMIA bombing | 18 July 1994 | Buenos Aires, Argentina | 86 (1p) (Note: 86 including 1 suicide bomber) | 300+ | Suspected Hezbollah and Iranian involvement | |
| Alas Chiricanas Flight 00901 bombing | 19 July 1994 | near Enrique Adolfo Jiménez Airport, Colón, Panama | 21 | 0 | Ali Hawa Jamal (unknown affiliation) | |
| Tokyo subway sarin attack | 20 March 1995 | Tokyo, Japan | 14 | 1,000 | Aum Shinrikyo (Ikuo Hayashi, Kenichi Hirose Toru Toyoda, Masato Yakayama and Yasuo Hayashi) | |
| Oklahoma City bombing | 19 April 1995 | Oklahoma City, Oklahoma, United States | 169 | 684 | Timothy McVeigh and Terry Nichols | |
| 1995 Paris RER bombing | 25 July 1995 | Paris, France | 8 | 117 | Armed Islamic Group of Algeria | |
| Kizlyar-Pervomayskoye hostage crisis | 9 to 18 January 1996 | Kizlyar, Pervomayskoye, and Sovetskoye | 200+ | 95 | Chechen Republic of Ichkeria | |
| Rais massacre | 28 August 1997 | village of Rais, near Sidi Moussa and south of Algiers, Algeria | 98 to 800 | 120 | Armed Islamic Group of Algeria | |
| Bentalha massacre | 22 September 1997 | village of Bentalha about 15 km south of Algiers, Algeria | 200 to 400 | | Armed Islamic Group of Algeria | |
| US Embassy Bombings | 7 August 1998 | Kenya, Tanzania | 224 | 4,000+ | Al-Qaeda | |
| Omagh bombing | 15 August 1998 | Omagh, Northern Ireland | 29 | 300+ | Real Irish Republican Army (RIRA) | |
| Russian apartment bombings | 4 to 16 September 1999 | Buynaksk, Moscow and Volgodonsk, Russia | 307 | 1,700+ | Ibn Al-Khattab, Achemez Gochiyayev and accomplices, (Note: According to rulings by Russian courts) or Federal Security Service and GRU (Note: according to David Satter, Alexander Litvinenko, Yuri Felshtinsky and some other researchers) | |

== 2000s ==
| Incident | Date | Location | Deaths | Injuries | Perpetrator | Notes |
|---|---|---|---|---|---|---|
| Walisongo school massacre | 28 May 2000 | Poso, Indonesia | Between 191 and 200 | Hundreds | Christian militant groups | |
| Rizal Day bombings | 30 December 2000 | Manila, Philippines | 22 | ~100 | Jemaah Islamiyah and Abu Sayyaf | |
| 2001 Angola train attack | 10 August 2001 | Angola | 252 | 165 | UNITA | |
| September 11 attacks | 11 September 2001 | United States | 2,996 | 6,000 to 25,000 | al-Qaeda | American Airlines Flight 11 crashed into One World Trade Center (North Tower) at 8:46 AM EDT. United Airlines Flight 175 crashed into Two World Trade Center (South Tower) at 9:03 AM EDT. American Airlines Flight 77 crashed into the Pentagon. At 9:28 AM EDT, United Airlines Flight 93 crashed in Pennsylvania after a struggle between hijackers and civilians on board. It is the deadliest terrorist attack in world history. |
| 2001 Indian Parliament attack | 13 December 2001 | India | 14 | 18 | Lashkar-e-Taiba, Jaish-e-Mohammed | |
| Passover massacre | 27 March 2002 | Israel | 30 (Note: Including the suicide bomber) | 160 | Hamas | An attack conducted on Passover Seder celebrations which were being held at the Park Hotel in Netanya, Israel. |
| 2002 Bali bombings | 12 October 2002 | Indonesia | 204 | 209 | Jemaah Islamiyah and al-Qaeda | |
| Moscow theater hostage crisis | 23 October 2002 | Russia | 132 | 700+ | Special Purpose Islamic Regiment | |
| SuperFerry 14 bombing | 26 February 2004 | Philippines | 116 | 300 | Abu Sayyaf | |
| 2004 Ashura massacre | 2 March 2004 | Kerbala and Baghdad, Iraq | 80 to 100 | 150 to 200 | Unknown | Anti-Shia sentiment |
| 2004 Madrid train bombings | 11 March 2004 | Madrid, Spain | 193 | 2,500 | Islamic extremists | |
| Beslan school siege | 1 to 3 September 2004 | Russia | 334 | 800+ | Riyad-us Saliheen Brigade of Martyrs | |
| 7/7 bombings, London | 7 July 2005 | London, England | 56 | 784 | al-Qaeda | |
| 2005 Sharm El Sheikh bombings | 23 July 2005 | Sharm El Sheikh, Sinai, Egypt | 88 | ~150 | al-Qaeda | |
| 2006 Mumbai train bombings | 11 July 2006 | Mumbai, India | 209 | 714 | Faisal Sheikh, Asif Khan, Kamal Ansari, Ehtesham Sidduqui and Naveed Khan; Islamic extremism | |
| 23 November 2006 Sadr City bombings | 23 November 2006 | Sadr City, Iraq | 215 | 140 | Unknown; Islamic extremism | |
| 18 April 2007 Baghdad bombings | 18 April 2007 | Iraq | 198 | 251 | Unknown; Anti-Shi'ism | |
| Qahtaniyah bombings | 14 August 2007 | Iraq | 796 | 1,562 | | |
| 2008 Mumbai attacks | 26 to 29 November 2008 | Mumbai, India | 175 | 300+ | Zakiur Rehman Lakhvi and Lashkar-e-Taiba | |
| 2008 Christmas massacres | 24 to 27 December 2008 | Democratic Republic of the Congo | 620 to 860 | | Lord's Resistance Army | |
| Camp Chapman attack | 30 December 2009 | Khost Province, Afghanistan | 10 | 6 | Humam Khalil Abu-Mulal al-Balawi, al-Qaeda, Pakistani Taliban | |

== 2010s ==
| Incident | Date | Location | Deaths | Injuries | Perpetrator | Notes |
|---|---|---|---|---|---|---|
| 2011 Norway attacks | 22 July 2011 | Oslo, Norway & Utøya, Norway | 77 | 320+ | Anders Behring Breivik | |
| January 2012 Northern Nigeria attacks | 5 to 20 January 2012 | Northern Nigeria | 222 | 57+ | Boko Haram | |
| 2013 Boston Marathon bombing | 15 April 2013 | Boston, MA, USA | 3 | 281 | Dzhokhar Tsarnaev and Tamerlan Tsarnaev (brothers) | |
| Westgate shopping mall attack | 21 September 2013 | Nairobi, Kenya | 71 | 175 | Al-Shabaab | |
| 2014 Gamboru Ngala massacre | 5 May 2014 | Nigeria | 300 | Unknown | Boko Haram | |
| Camp Speicher massacre | 12 June 2014 | Iraq | 1,095 to 1,700 | | Islamic State of Iraq and the Levant | |
| 2014 Peshawar school massacre | 16 December 2014 | Pakistan | 155 | 114 | Pakistani Taliban | |

=== 2015 ===
| Date | Incident | Killed | Injured | Location | Details | Perpetrator | Part of |
|---|---|---|---|---|---|---|---|
| January 3–7 | Baga massacre | 150–2,000 | Unknown | Baga, Borno State, Nigeria | Boko Haram militants opened fire on northern Nigerian villages, leaving bodies scattered everywhere, reporting over 100 fatalities with as many as 2,000 people unaccounted for – feared dead. | Boko Haram | Boko Haram insurgency |
| January 7–9 | January 2015 Île-de-France attacks | 17 (+3 preparators) | 22 | Paris, France | From 7 January 2015 to 9 January 2015, terrorist attacks occurred across the Île-de-France region, particularly in Paris. Three attackers killed a total of 17 in four shooting attacks, and police then killed the three assailants.The main attacks were the Charlie Hebdo shooting and the Hypercacher kosher supermarket siege . The organization Al-Qaeda in the Arabian Peninsula claimed responsibility and said that the coordinated attacks had been planned for years. | Al-Qaeda | Islamic terrorism in Europe |
| March 20 | 2015 Sanaa mosque bombings | 142 | 351+ | Sanaa, Yemen | Islamic State militants in Yemen carried out five suicide bombings at the Badr and al-Hashoosh Shia mosques during prayers in the city of Sanaa. | Islamic State Yemen branch | Yemeni Civil War (2015–present) |
| April 2 | Garissa University College attack | 148 | 79 | Garissa, Kenya | Six to ten gunmen associated with the Islamic terrorist group Al-Shabaab opened fire at the Garissa University in Kenya. Christians were their main target of the attack, with the Islamic extremists separating the Muslims from Christians before executing them. Up to three hundred students are unaccounted for. One hundred and forty-eight students were reported killed, along with seventy-nine wounded. Four gunmen were killed by security forces. | Al-Shabaab | War in Somalia |
| June 25 | Kobanî massacre | 223+ | 300+ | Kobanî, Syria | On 25 June 2015, fighters from the Islamic State of Iraq and the Levant detonated three car bombs in Kobanî, close to the Turkish border crossing. | Islamic State | Syrian Civil War |
| June 26 | 2015 Sousse attacks | 38 (+ the preparator) | 39 | Port El Kantaoui, Sousse, Tunisia | A mass shooting occurred at the tourist resort at Port El Kantaoui, about 10 kilometres north of the city of Sousse, Tunisia. | Islamic State | Islamist extremism |
| July 1–2 | 30 June and 1 July 2015 Borno massacres | 145 | 17 | Kukawa, Nigeria | Boko Haram militants attacked multiple mosques between July 1 and 2. Forty-eight men and boys were killed on the 1st at one mosque in Kukawa. Seventeen were wounded in the attack. Ninety-seven others, mostly men, were killed in numerous mosques on the 2nd with a number of women and young girls killed in their homes. An unknown number were wounded. Boko Haram claimed responsibility. | Boko Haram | Boko Haram insurgency |
| July 17 | 2015 Khan Bani Saad bombing | 120–130 | 130+ | Khan Bani Saad, Iraq | A car bomb was sent to a crowded market in Khan Bani Saad in Iraq, 30 km north to Baghdad, during the Eid al-Fitr celebrations. The explosion killed at least 120 (15 children among them) and injuring another 170 people and brought down several buildings. ISIL claimed responsibility and said 180 people were killed. | Islamic State | Iraq War |
| September 20 | September 2015 Borno State bombings | 145 | 97–150+ | Maiduguri, Nigeria | Boko Haram executed a series of blasts, some of which were Suicide bombings, in the north eastern city of Maiduguri, targeting a market and civilians in a mosque during night pray and a football match viewers, bringing the total number of casualties to at least 53 dead and over 90 wounded. The attack was said to be made using homemade weapons. | Boko Haram | Boko Haram insurgency |
| October 10 | 2015 Ankara bombings | 109 | 508 | Ankara, Turkey | Two suicide bombers blew themselves up near Ankara central station where a rally for peace supported by HDP was taking place. The attack left 109 dead and 508 injured. | Islamic State | November 2015 Turkish general election |
| October 31 | Metrojet Flight 9268 | 224 | 0 (Note: No survivors on the plane) | Sinai, Egypt | ISIL militants have claimed destruction of Metrojet Flight 9268. Bomb is cited by experts as the most likely cause. | Islamic State | Sinai insurgency |
| November 12 | 2015 Beirut bombings | 43 | 200+ | Beirut, Lebanon | Two suicide bombers detonated explosives in Bourj el-Barajneh. | Islamic State | Islamist extremism |
| November 13 | November 2015 Paris attacks | 138 (7p, 131v) | 200+ | Paris, France | November 2015 Paris attacks: A series of attacks occurred simultaneously in central Paris. The first shooting attack occurred in a restaurant and a bar in 10th arrondissement of Paris. A bomb was detonated at Bataclan theatre in 11th arrondissement of Paris during a rock concert. Dozens were killed, and approximately 100 hostages were taken. Another bombing took place in the Stade de France stadium in the suburb of Saint-Denis during a football game. | Islamic State | Islamic terrorism in Europe |

=== 2016 ===
| Date | Type | Killed | Injured | Location | Details | Perpetrator | Part of |
|---|---|---|---|---|---|---|---|
| 11 January | Bombings | 132 | Unknown | Sharaban, Iraq | January 2016 Iraq attacks: Two huge bomb blasts, one at a teashop and the other at a mosque, killed at least 100 people in the township of Sharaban in Iraq's northern Diyala Governorate. | Islamic State | Iraqi Civil War |
| 16 January | Massacre | 135–300+ | Unknown | Deir ez-Zor, Syria | ISIL militants attacked the neighbourhoods of Begayliya and Ayash in Deir ez-Zor, killing dozens of people in execution-style murder. Fatality estimates variates between 135 and over 300. International sources reported that the attack was against Syrian Army personnel and killed 85 Syrian soldiers along with 50 civilians while Syrian sources said over 300 people were killed, most of whom were children and women. ISIL claimed responsibility for the attack and claimed suicide bombers were used. | Islamic State | Syrian Civil War – Deir ez-Zor offensive (January 2016) |
| 21 February | Bombing | 134 (+2) | 180 | Sayyidah Zaynab, Syria | February 2016 Sayyidah Zaynab bombings: Islamic State militants detonated a car bomb and later launched two suicide bombings, about 400 meters from Sayyidah Zaynab Mosque, a Shi'ite shrine, believed to contain the grave of Islamic prophet Muhammad's granddaughter. 83 to 134 people were killed and 180 wounded, including children. Syrian media said the attack occurred when pupils were leaving school in the area. At least 60 shops were damaged as well as cars in the area. Islamic State claimed responsibility. | Islamic State | Syrian Civil War |
| 22 March | Bombings | 35 (3p, 32v) | 340 | Brussels, Belgium | 2016 Brussels bombings: On the morning of 22 March 2016, three coordinated suicide bombings occurred in Belgium: two at Brussels Airport in Zaventem, and one at Maalbeek metro station in central Brussels. | Islamic State | Islamic terrorism in Europe |
| 17 May | Suicide and car bombings, shooting | 101+ | 194+ | Baghdad, Iraq | May 2016 Baghdad bombings: A series of eight attacks in Baghdad killed numerous people and wounded more. | Islamic State | Iraqi Civil War |
| 23 May | Suicide bombing | 184 (5) | 200 | Jableh and Tartus, Syria | May 2016 Jableh and Tartous bombings: Nearly 150 people are killed and at least 200 wounded in a series of car bomb and suicide attacks in the Syrian cities of Jableh and Tartus in government-controlled territory that hosts Russian military bases. The Islamic State of Iraq and the Levant claims responsibility. | Islamic State | Syrian Civil War |
| 12 June | Mass shooting | 49 (+1) | 53 | Orlando, US | 2016 Pulse Nightclub attack: On the early morning of 12 June 2016, a lone wolf Islamic terrorist went on a shooting rampage inside a gay nightclub, killing 49 victims before being shot dead by police. | Lone wolf named Omar Mateen | Islamic extremism |
| 3 July | Bombing | 347+ | 250+ | Baghdad, Iraq | 2016 Karrada bombing: At least 346 people were killed, and over 246 injured, in a series of coordinated bomb attacks in Baghdad. Early in the evening of July 3, a large car bomb exploded in the middle of a busy market, killing nearly 346 civilians. The blast occurred in the Baghdad neighborhood of Karrada, which contains Shia Muslims and a large Christian minority. A second car bombing in the district of Sha'ab killed at least 5 people and injured 16, while two more bombings killed at least two more people. | Islamic State | Iraqi Civil War |
| 14 July | Vehicle-ramming attack | 86 (+1) | 434 | Nice, France | 2016 Nice truck attack: On the evening of 14 July 2016, a 19-tonne cargo truck was deliberately driven into crowds of people celebrating Bastille Day on the Promenade des Anglais in Nice, France. | Lone wolf | Islamic extremism |
| 24 November | Suicide truck bombing | 125 (+1) | 95 | Hillah, Iraq | November 2016 Hillah suicide truck bombing: A truck bomb killed at least 125 people in Hillah city 95 others are injured. | Islamic State | Iraqi Civil War |
| 19 December | Vehicle-ramming attack | 12 (+1) | 55 | Berlin, Germany | 2016 Berlin truck attack: On 19 December 2016, a truck was deliberately driven into the Christmas market next to the Kaiser Wilhelm Memorial Church at Breitscheidplatz in Berlin, leaving 12 people dead and 56 others injured. One of the victims was the truck's original driver, Łukasz Urban, who was found shot dead in the passenger seat. | Lone wolf named Anis Amri | Islamic extremism |

=== 2017 ===
| Date | Type | Killed | Injured | Location | Details | Suspected perpetrator | Part of |
|---|---|---|---|---|---|---|---|
| April 7 | Vehicle-ramming attack | 5 | 14 | Stockholm, Sweden | 2017 Stockholm truck attack: Stockholm truck attack An attacker used a truck to run over pedestrians along a shopping street before crashing into a department store. Five people were killed and 14 others wounded. Police said the attacker, an Uzbek immigrant, had shown sympathies for extremist organizations including ISIL. He was sentenced to life in prison and lifetime expulsion from Sweden in June 2018. | Sympathiser of ISIL | Islamic terrorism in Europe |
| April 15 | Suicide car bombing | 126+ | 60+ | Aleppo, Syria | 2017 Aleppo suicide car bombing: In a district of Aleppo a strong explosion occurred. According to provisional data, a motor bomb exploded. The blast killed at least 126 people, including more than 60 children. | Unknown | Syrian Civil War |
| May 22 | Suicide bombing | 23 (1p, 22v) | 112+ | Manchester, England | Manchester Arena bombing: On 22 May 2017, an Islamist extremist suicide bomber detonated a shrapnel-laden homemade bomb as people were leaving the Manchester Arena following a concert by American singer Ariana Grande. | Two Lone Assassins | Islamic terrorism in Europe |
| May 31 | Car Bombing | 150+ | 413+ | Kabul, Afghanistan | May 2017 Kabul attack: A car bombing in Kabul's diplomatic quarter killed at least 150 persons and wounded 413 others. | Islamic Jihad Union (suspected) | War in Afghanistan |
| June 3 | Vehicle-ramming attack, stabbing | 11 (3p, 8v) | 48 | London, England | 2017 London Bridge attack: Three assailants used a van to ram pedestrians on London Bridge and then drove to Borough Market, where the three attacked people with knives before being shot by police. Eight people were killed and 48 were injured. The injured included four unarmed police officers. Europol classified the attack as jihadist terrorism | Islamic State | Islamic terrorism in Europe |
| June 7 | Suicide bombing, mass shooting, hostage-taking | 23 | 52 | Tehran, Iran | 2017 Tehran attacks: The 2017 Tehran attacks were a series of two simultaneous terrorist attacks that were carried out by five terrorists belonging to the Islamic State of Iraq and the Levant (ISIL) against the Iranian Parliament building and the Mausoleum of Ruhollah Khomeini, both in Tehran, Iran. | Islamic State | Terrorism in Iran |
| August 17–18 | Vehicle-ramming attack, stabbing | 24 (8p, 16v) | 152 | Barcelona, Spain | 2017 Barcelona attacks: On 17 August 2017, a van was driven into pedestrians on La Rambla in Barcelona, killing 14 and injuring at least 130. The following day, a woman was killed in a related attack in Cambrils when a car tried to run into pedestrians and attackers stabbed people. A policeman shot and killed four of the five attackers while the fifth died later of his injuries. ISIL claimed responsibility for the Ramblas attack. Europol classified the attack as terrorism. | Islamic State | Islamic terrorism in Europe |
| October 14 | Suicide truck bombing | 587 | 303 | Mogadishu, Somalia | 14 October 2017 Mogadishu bombings: At least 587 people were killed and 303 wounded in a suicide truck bombing in Mogadishu. | Al-Shabaab (suspected) | Somali Civil War (2009–present) |
| November 24 | Car bombing and shooting | 311 | 128+ | Bir al-Abed, Egypt | 2017 Sinai mosque attack: A mosque located near the town of Bir al-Abed was attacked by more than 10 militants. The attackers used three car bombs and four off-road vehicles to block escape routes, and opened fire at worshippers during a crowded Friday prayer at al-Rawada. First responders were also attacked upon arrival. | Islamic State: Wilayat Sinai | Sinai insurgency Terrorism in Egypt |

=== 2018 ===
| Date | Type | Killed | Injured | Location | Details | Suspected perpetrator | Part of |
|---|---|---|---|---|---|---|---|
| January 27 | Suicide car bombing | 103 | 235 | Kabul, Afghanistan | 2018 Kabul ambulance bombing: 103 people were killed and 235 others injured when a Taliban suicide bomber exploded an ambulance laden with explosives near Sidarat Square in central Kabul where several government offices are located. | Taliban | War in Afghanistan |
| July 13 | Suicide bombing | 154 | 223 | Mastung, Pakistan | 13 July 2018 Pakistan bombings: 154 people, including the Balochistan Awami Party candidate Nawabzada Siraj Raisani, were killed and 223 others injured when a suicide bomber detonated his explosives in Mastung in the Pakistani province of Balochistan. | Islamic State | War in North-West Pakistan |
| July 25 | Suicide bombings, shootings, hostage taking | 255 (+63) | 180 | As-Suwayda Governorate, Syria | 2018 As-Suwayda attacks: Islamic state militants carried out suicide bombings and gun attacks in the city of As-Suwayda and a number of villages in the southern Syrian governorate of As-Suwayda, killing 255 people, including 142 civilians, and injuring 180 others. At least 63 terrorists were also killed, including the suicide bombers. The jihadists also seized hostages from the villages they had attacked. | Islamic State | Syrian Civil War |
| December 11 | Mass shooting | 5 | 11 | Strasbourg, France | 2018 Strasbourg attack: A French citizen attacked people at a Christmas market in Strasbourg with a gun and a knife, killing five civilians and wounding eleven others. The man was killed two days later by police. Europol classified the attack as jihadist terrorism. | Jihadist attacker | Islamic terrorism in Europe |

=== 2019 ===
| Date | Type | Killed | Injured | Location | Details | Suspected perpetrator | Part of |
|---|---|---|---|---|---|---|---|
| March 15 | Mass shooting | 51 | 40 | Christchurch, New Zealand | Christchurch mosque shootings: Brenton Tarrant carried out two mosque shootings, killing 51 people and injuring 40 more. | Brenton Tarrant | White supremacy |
| April 21 | Suicide bombings | 269 | 500+ | Sri Lanka | 2019 Sri Lanka Easter bombings: On Easter Sunday, three churches across Sri Lanka and three luxury hotels in the commercial capital Colombo, were bombed. Later that day, two smaller explosions occurred at a housing complex and a guest house, killing mainly police officers investigating the bombings and raiding suspect locations. 269 people were killed, including at least 45 foreign nationals, and around 500 were injured in the bombings. | National Thowheeth Jama'ath | Islamic extremism |

== 2020s ==
=== 2020 ===
| Date | Type | Killed | Injured | Location | Details | Suspected perpetrator | Part of |
|---|---|---|---|---|---|---|---|
| November 2 | Mass shooting | 5 (1p, 4v) | 23 | Vienna, Austria | 2020 Vienna attack: Four people were killed and 22 were injured in a shooting attack in 1st district, Vienna. The gunman was wearing a fake suicide vest and was shot dead by police. | A sympathiser of the Islamic State | Islamic State terrorism in 2020 |

=== 2021 ===
| Date | Type | Killed | Injured | Location | Details | Suspected perpetrator | Part of |
|---|---|---|---|---|---|---|---|
| March 21 | Massacres | 137 | Unknown | Tahoua Region, Niger | 2021 Tahoua attacks: 137 people were killed in a series of attacks on villages, camps and hamlet's by armed jihadists. | Islamic State – Sahil Province | Jihadist insurgency in Niger |
| August 26 | Suicide bombing, mass shooting | 182 (+1) | 150+ | Hamid Karzai International Airport, Kabul, Afghanistan | 2021 Kabul airport attack: 182 people, including 13 members of the United States military, were killed in a suicide bombing attack near Abbey Gate of the Kabul Airport. The attack took place during the mass evacuation from Afghanistan following the Taliban takeover of Afghanistan and the Fall of Kabul. | ISIS-K | Islamic State–Taliban conflict |

=== 2022 ===
| Date | Type | Killed | Injured | Location | Details | Suspected perpetrator | Part of |
|---|---|---|---|---|---|---|---|
| 4–6 January | Arson, mass shooting, massacres | 200+ | Unknown | Anka and Bukkuyum, Zamfara State, Nigeria | 2022 Zamfara massacres: Bandits massacred an estimated 200 people after a military crackdown occurred. | Bandits | Nigerian bandit conflict |
| 4 March | Mass shooting, suicide bombing | 63 (1p, 62v) | 196 | Peshawar, Pakistan | 2022 Peshawar mosque attack | Islamic State – Khorasan Province | Persecution of Shias by the Islamic State |
| 29 October | Car bomb, Suicide attack, Mass shooting | 121 | 350 | Mogadishu, Somalia | 2022 Somali Ministry of Education bombings | Al-Shabaab | Somali Civil War |

=== 2023 ===
| Date | Type | Killed | Injured | Location | Details | Suspected perpetrator | Part of |
|---|---|---|---|---|---|---|---|
| 30 January | Suicide bombing | 101 (1p, 100v) | 220+ | Police Lines area, Peshawar, Khyber Pakhtunkhwa, Pakistan | 2023 Peshawar mosque bombing: A suicide bombing inside a mosque in the Police Lines area of Peshawar, Khyber Pakhtunkhwa, Pakistan. The bomber triggered a suicide vest during the solar noon Zuhr prayers, killing 101 people and injuring over 220 others | Jamaat-ul-Ahrar faction of Tehrik-i-Taliban Pakistan | insurgency in Khyber Pakhtunkhwa |
| 7 October | Mass shooting (and other methods) | 1,195–1,207 | 3,400 | Villages, cities and roads in Southern Israel, including the Nova music festival and army bases. | October 7 attacks: Thousands of Hamas militants launched a coordinated attack on Israel, firing thousands of rockets, simultaneously invading the Gaza–Israel border and then shooting at soldiers and civilians. 815 civilians were killed and 251 hostages taken. | Hamas and other armed groups | Israeli-Palestinian Conflict 2023 Israel Gaza War |

=== 2024 ===
| Date | Type | Killed | Injured | Location | Details | Perpetrator |
|---|---|---|---|---|---|---|
| 3 January | Suicide bombings | 105 (2p) (Note: Including the two suicide bombers) | 284 | Kerman, Iran | 2024 Kerman bombings: Two suicide bombers from the Afghanistan branch of ISIS, IS-K attack a commemorative ceremony for Qasem Soleimani | Islamic State – Khorasan Province |
| 22 March | Mass shooting, slashing attacks, fire | 151 | 551 | Crocus City Hall music venue in Krasnogorsk, Russia, on the western edge of Moscow | Crocus City Hall attack: Four gunmen carried out a mass shooting, as well as slashing attacks on the people gathered at the venue and used incendiary devices to set the venue on fire. Investigators said the following day the attack had killed at least 133 people, with more than 100 concertgoers injured. The Islamic State – Khorasan Province (IS–K), a South-Central Asia-based regional affiliate of the Islamic State, claimed responsibility shortly after the attack. | Islamic State – Khorasan Province |
| 24 August | Mass shooting | 600+ | 300+ | Barsalogho, Barsalogho Department, Burkina Faso | 2024 Barsalogho attack: JNIM militants opened fire on civilians and soldiers digging defensive trenches for the army, killing at least 600 people and injuring over 300 others. | Jama'at Nasr al-Islam wal-Muslimin |
| 3 September | Mass shooting, arson, looting, massacre | 130 | 30+ | Mafa, Tarmuwa, Yobe State, Nigeria | Tarmuwa massacre: Terrorists opened fire on worshippers and villagers at homes and markets, looted and set ablaze houses, schools and shops, killing 130 people and injuring at least 30 others. | Islamic State – West Africa Province |
| 17 September | Mass shooting, arson | 81-100+ | 255+ | Bamako, Mali | 2024 Bamako attacks: Gunmen attacked several locations across Bamako, killing at least 81 people and injuring over 255 others. | Jama'at Nasr al-Islam wal-Muslimin |
| 9 November | Suicide bombing | 32 (1p) (Note: Including the suicide bomber) | 55 | Quetta, Balochistan, Pakistan | Quetta railway station bombing: A suicide bomber identified as Muhammad Rafiq Bizenjo detonated an explosive device at the Quetta railway station, killing himself and 31 other people, and injuring 55 others. The Balochistan Liberation Army claimed responsibility for the attack. | Balochistan Liberation Army |

=== 2025 ===
| Date | Type | Killed | Injured | Location | Details | Perpetrator |
|---|---|---|---|---|---|---|
| January 1st | Vehicle ramming attack | 15 (1p, 14v) | 57 | New Orleans, Louisiana, United States | 2025 New Orleans truck attack: Shamsud-Din Bahar Jabbar, a United States Military Veteran, drove a rented Ford F-150 Lightning into a crowd celebrating New Year's Day on Bourbon Street in New Orleans, before entering a firefight with police, resulting in his death. | Shamsud-Din Bahar Jabbar (Note: Islamic Extremism inspired by the Islamic State) |
| March 11 | Hijacking, bombings, mass shooting, hostage situation | 64 (Note: Including 33 attackers) | 38 | Bolan Pass, Sibi, Balochistan, Pakistan | 2025 Jaffar Express hijacking: Militants derailed the Jaffar Express train with explosives before killing people and taking hostages, killing 31 security personnel and civilians and injuring 38 others. 33 attackers were also killed. | Balochistan Liberation Army |
| April 22nd | Mass shooting | 26 | - | Baisaran Valley, Pahalgam, Jammu and Kashmir, India | 2025 Pahalgam attack: Terrorists attacked tourists in Pahalgam, Jammu and Kashmir, killing 26 civilians, mainly Hindus. The terrorists asked victims about their religion and targeted non-Muslims. Police sources linked the attack to the Pakistan-backed group TRF. India responded with diplomatic action against Pakistan, border closures, and military retaliation. The attack worsened India-Pakistan tensions and was condemned internationally. | The Resistance Front, Lashkar-e-Taiba |
| October 28 | Mass shooting | 460+ | - | El Fasher, North Darfur, Sudan | 2025 El Fasher hospital attack: Over 460 people are killed in an attack on a hospital by the Rapid Support Forces in El Fasher, North Darfur, Sudan. | Rapid Support Forces |
| November 10 | Car bomb | 15+ | 30+ | Near Red Fort , New Delhi, India | 2025 Delhi car explosion:A car bomb exploded in front of Red Fort, New Delhi. | Currently under investigation |
| December 14 | Mass shooting | 16 (1p, 15v) | 40 | Bondi Beach, Sydney, Australia | 2025 Bondi Beach shooting: A terrorist mass shooting occurred at Bondi Beach in Sydney, Australia, in the afternoon during a Hanukkah celebration attended by approximately one thousand people. | Sajid Akram and Naveed Akram |

=== 2026 ===
| Date | Type | Killed | Injured | Location | Details | Perpetrator |
|---|---|---|---|---|---|---|
| January 30 – February 5 | Mass shooting, suicide bombing | 274 (Note: Including 216 attackers) | Unknown | Balochistan, Pakistan | Jan–Feb 2026 Balochistan attacks: Insurgents attacked multiple districts, killing 58. | Balochistan Liberation Army |
| February 3–4 | Mass shooting, arson, kidnapping | 200+ | 50+ | Kwara State, Nigeria | 2026 Kwara State attacks: Hundreds of militants attacked two villages, killing over 200 and hospitalizing more than 50. | Boko Haram |
| February 6 | Suicide bombing, shooting | 33 (Note: Including the attacker) | 170+ | Islamabad, Pakistan | 2026 Islamabad mosque bombing: A man opened fire before carrying out a suicide bombing at a mosque, killing 33 and injuring more than 170 others. | Islamic State – Pakistan Province |
| March 16 | Suicide bombings | 30 (Note: Including the attackers) | 146 | Maiduguri, Borno State, Nigeria | 2026 Maiduguri bombings: Three suicide bombings were carried out at two markets and a hospital, killing 27 people and injuring 146 others. | Boko Haram |
| April 18 | Mass shooting | 8 (Note: Including the attacker) | 13 | Holosiivskyi District, Kyiv, Ukraine | 2026 Kyiv shooting: A man opened fire on bystanders and neighbours before taking hostages inside a supermarket, killing seven and injuring 13. The gunman was shot dead by police. | Dmytro Vasylchenkov |
| May 9 | Suicide bombing, shootout | 22 (Note: Including an attacker) | 5 | Bannu, Khyber Pakhtunkhwa, Pakistan | 2026 Bannu attacks: More than 100 attackers ambushed a security post and police officers, killing 21 and injuring five. | Ittihad-ul-Mujahideen Pakistan |
| May 24 | Suicide bombing, vehicle-ramming attack | 48 (Note: Including the attacker) | 98 | Quetta, Balochistan, Pakistan | 2026 Quetta train bombing: A suicide bomber drove an explosives-laden vehicle into a shuttle train at a rail line, killing 47 people, including 20 soldiers, and injuring 98 others. | Balochistan Liberation Army |

== Other attacks ==
This is a list of terrorist incidents with at least 100 fatalities, that are not included in the chronological timeline.

| Estimated Deaths | Name | Political Ideology | Country | Location | Year |
|---|---|---|---|---|---|
| 155 | October 2009 Baghdad bombings | Islamic extremism | Iraq | Baghdad | 2009 |
| 152 | 2007 Tal Afar bombings and massacre | Islamic extremism | Iraq | Tal Afar | 2007 |
| 148 | Gyaneshwari Express train derailment | Communism | India | West Midnapore | 2010 |
| 141+ | Brak El-Shati airbase raid | Islamic extremism | Libya | Wadi al Shatii District | 2017 |
| 140–256 | 2017 Camp Shaheen attack | Islamic extremism | Afghanistan | Mazar-e-Sharif | 2017 |
| 140 | Budyonnovsk hospital hostage crisis | Chechen separatism | Russia | Budyonnovsk | 1995 |
| 136 | 2007 Karachi bombing | Islamic extremism | Pakistan | Karachi | 2007 |
| 135 | February 3, 2007 Baghdad market bombing | Islamic extremism | Iraq | Baghdad | 2007 |
| 133+ | January 2011 Iraq suicide attacks | Islamic extremism | Iraq | | 2011 |
| 130 | Rafiganj train disaster | Communism | India | Rafiganj | 2002 |
| 127 | Peshawar church attack | Islamic extremism | Pakistan | Peshawar | 2013 |
| 127 | December 2009 Baghdad bombings | Islamic extremism | Iraq | Baghdad | 2009 |
| 127 | 2005 Al Hillah bombing | Unknown | Iraq | Al Hillah | 2005 |
| 125 | Ethiopian Airlines Flight 961 | Unknown | Indian Ocean | | 1996 |
| 120 | 2007 Al Hillah bombings | Islamic extremism | Iraq | Al Hillah | 2007 |
| 120 | 2012 Unity Day parade rehearsal bombing | Islamic extremism | Yemen | Sanaa | 2012 |
| 120 | Palace of Justice siege | 19th of April Movement | Colombia | Bogotá | 1985 |
| 119 | Bojayá massacre | United Self-Defense Forces of Colombia | Colombia | Choco | 2002 |
| 117 | 28 October 2009 Peshawar bombing | Islamic extremism | Pakistan | Peshawar | 2009 |
| 117 | 2004 Irbil bombings | Islamic extremism | Iraq | Irbil | 2004 |
| 114+ | 10 May 2010 Iraq attacks | Islamic extremism | Iraq | Baghdad | 2010 |
| 114 | March 2017 Damascus bombings | Islamic extremism | Syria | Damascus | 2017 |
| 113+ | 2 November 2010 Baghdad bombings | Islamic extremism | Iraq | Baghdad | 2010 |
| 112 | September 14, 2005 Baghdad bombing | Islamic extremism | Iraq | Baghdad | 2005 |
| 112 | Avianca Flight 203 | Narcoterrorism | Colombia | | 1989 |
| 112 | Gulf Air Flight 771 | Palestinian nationalism | United Arab Emirates | Dubai | 1983 |
| 110 | 10 October 2008 Orakzai bombing | Islamic extremism | Pakistan | Orakzai | 2008 |
| 105 | 2010 Lakki Marwat suicide bombing | Islamic extremism | Pakistan | Lakki Marwat | 2010 |
| 104 | Mohmand Agency attack | Islamic extremism | Pakistan | Mohmand Agency | 2010 |
| 102 | First Tyre truck bombing attack | Islamic extremism | Lebanon | Tyre | 1982 |
| 101 | 19 August 2009 Baghdad bombings | Islamic extremism | Iraq | Baghdad | 2009 |
| 100 | Bolgrad palace bombing | Bessarabian separatism | Romania | Bolgrad | 1921 |
| 100+ | 2011 Damaturu attacks | Islamic extremism | Nigeria | | 2011 |
| 100 | Malaysian Airline System Flight 653 hijacking | Communism | Malaysia | Tanjung Kupang | 1977 |
| 100 | 2008 Kandahar bombing | Islamic extremism | Afghanistan | Kandahar | 2008 |

== See also ==
- List of terrorist incidents
