= Massacre of Trujillo =

Series of murders in Trujillo, Colombia

- Map location of the municipality of Trujillo
- Location: Trujillo, Valle del Cauca Department; Colombia
- Date: 28 October 1988 – 5 May 1991 (EDT)
- Target: Trujillo
- Attack type: mass murder, massacre
- Weapon: unknown
- Deaths: 200 to 400
- Perpetrators: Paramilitary groups and Cali Cartel members (prominently Juan Carlos Ortiz Escobar and Henry Loaiza-Ceballos)

The Massacre of Trujillo (Spanish: Masacre de Trujillo) was a series of murders perpetrated between October 1988 and May 1991 in the town of Trujillo, Valle del Cauca Department in southwestern Colombia by paramilitaries and the Cali Cartel with the complicity of active members of the Colombian military and police.

Some 245 to 342 people, including unionists and suspected guerrilla supporters, were tortured and dismembered. Among the more gruesome murders was the decapitation and castration of Father Tiberio Fernandez, the local Jesuit priest. The murders were seen as a warning to other pro-guerrilla elements. Most of the corpses were thrown into the waters of the Cauca River.

== Judicial Proceedings ==
The Colombian government declared itself guilty of negligence and the Inter-American Commission on Human Rights was also notified of the case.

Some members of the Cali Cartel accused of participating in this massacre were Henry Loaiza-Ceballos "aka The Scorpion" and Juan Carlos Ortiz Escobar "aka Knife".

The case was first officially acknowledged and investigated in the mid-1990s under Colombian President Ernesto Samper (1994–1998); however, no one was ever tried for the killings. Declassified U.S. government documents suggest that the United States government regarded this and other human rights investigations under President Samper as lacking resolve.

On March 19, 2008, the Attorney General of Colombia accused retired Colombian Army Major Alirio Antonio Urueña Jaramillo, former Colombian National Police Lieutenant José Fernando Berrio and former Sergeant Aníbal Álvarez Hoyos for their involvement with a paramilitary group during the massacre.

In March 1990, Major Urueña was the acting commander of the Palacé Battalion in Buga which was engaging in counterinsurgency operations against the ELN guerrilla, Lieutenant Berrio Velásquez was acting commander of the police station in Trujillo and former Sergeant Álvarez Hoyos was in charge of the Sijin in Tuluá.

The case was re-opened in 2008 following the publication of an independent report by the Historical Memory Group.
