= Jorge Salcedo =

Jorge Salcedo is the name of:

- Jorge Salcedo (actor) (1915–1988), Argentinian actor
- Jorge Salcedo (soccer) (born 1972), American soccer player and coach
- Jorge Salcedo Cabrera (born 1947), Colombian informant for the DEA
