= Samuel Darío Maldonado Vivas =

Venezuelan surgeon and politician (1870–1925)

Samuel Darío Maldonado
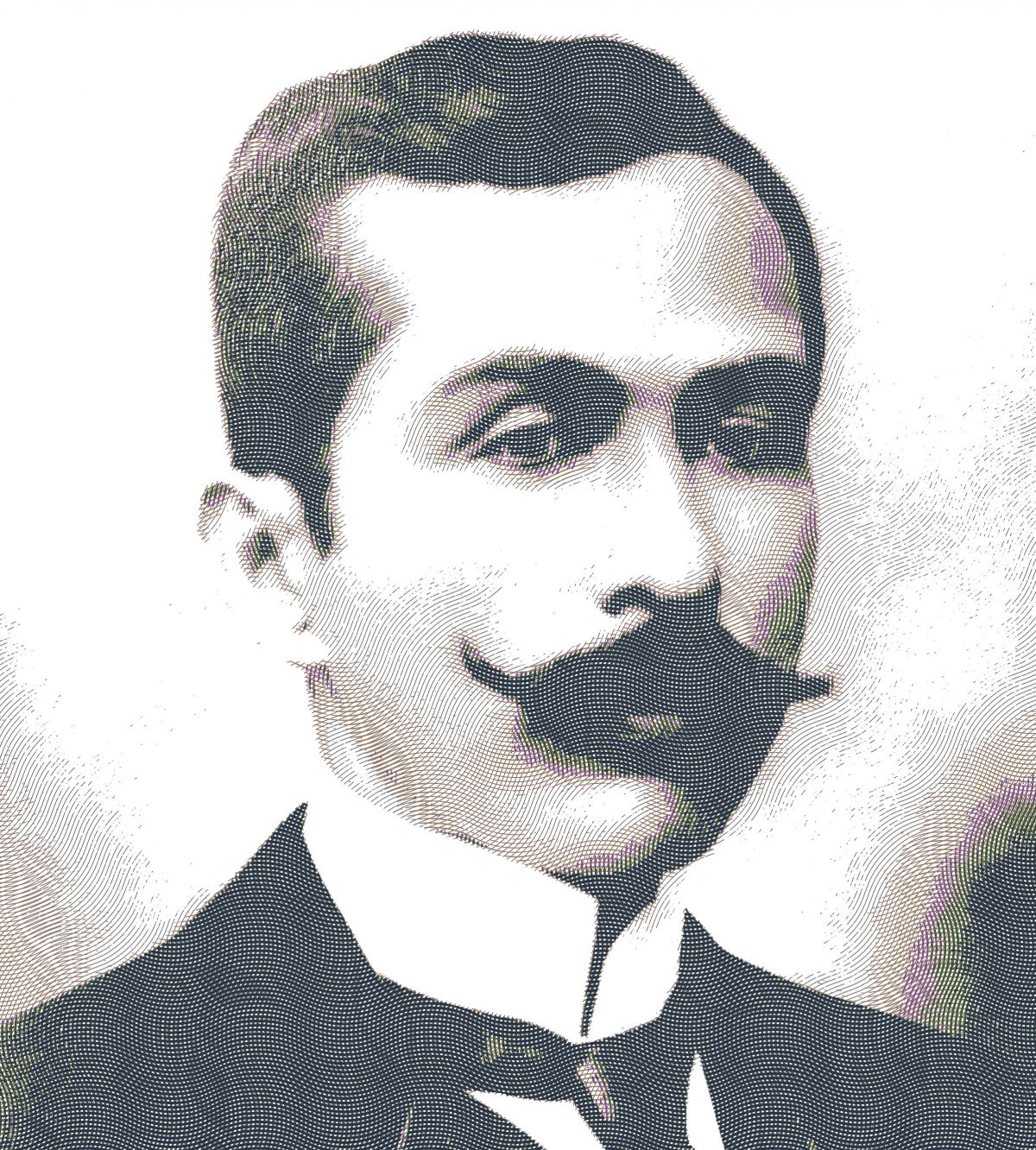
- Samuel Dario Maldonado Vivas in 1911
- In office 19 April 1925 – 6 October 1925

Governor of Aragua Venezuela Governor of Delta Amacuro Venezuela Governor of Amazonas (Venezuelan state)

Minister of Public Instruction of Venezuela
- In office 19 December 1908 – 2 June 1910
- President: Juan Vicente Gómez
- Preceded by: José Antonio Baldó
- Succeeded by: Trino Baptista

Personal details
- Born: February 7, 1870 Venezuela Ureña, Táchira, Venezuela
- Died: October 6, 1925 (aged 55) Venezuela Caracas, Venezuela
- Spouse: Dolores Bello Torres
- Relations: Buenaventura Macabeo Maldonado Vivas (brother)
- Children: Iván Darío Maldonado Bello Ricardo Juan Maldonado Bello
- Parent(s): Juan Bautista Maldonado and Cornelia Vivas
- Occupation: Physician, politician, writer, journalist, ethnologist, and anthropologist. Senator of the United States of Venezuela from Táchira

Samuel Darío Maldonado Vivas (February 7, 1870, Ureña, Táchira State, Venezuela – October 6, 1925, Caracas, Venezuela) was a Venezuelan surgeon, anthropologist, writer, journalist and politician. He is known for his work as a sanitary doctor and as director of the National Health Office during the government of Juan Vicente Gómez.

In the field of literature and journalism, he stood out for his poetic work, the creation of newspapers, and his opinion articles in important Venezuelan papers such as El Cojo Ilustrado, El Universal and El Tiempo. He also conducted anthropological studies on the indigenous peoples of the Venezuelan Amazon jungle and the east of the country.

== Biography ==
=== Early years ===
Samuel Darío Maldonado was born on February 7, 1870, in Ureña, Táchira state, Venezuela. He was the son of landowner Juan Bautista Maldonado and Cornelia Vivas de Maldonado. He was the youngest of four brothers, among them General Buenaventura Macabeo Maldonado. He spent his first years in the family ranch (hacienda) El Pitonal, property acquired by his father in 1858. He studied at the Sagrado Corazón de Jesús de La Grita School. Although there are no precise records about his first years of education, according to what Maldonado himself stated in the essay "Carta Autocrítica" ["Self-critical letter"], he did his primary school studies at the hacienda El Pitonal.

On the other hand, his high school studies were carried out in the Colombian cities of Cúcuta and Pamplona, where he graduated with a Bachelor of Science. However, according to a letter signed by students of the Colegio Superior del Táchira on April 22, 1886, in support of the students of the Central University of Venezuela (who were repressed in a protest against the government of President Cipriano Castro), Maldonado's name appears among the signatories. For this reason, José Pascual Mora García (2009) presumes in Historia de la educación en Venezuela [History of Education in Venezuela] that Maldonado may have belonged to that institution.

=== University studies ===
After completing his primary and high school studies, Samuel Darío Maldonado enters the University of Mérida to train as a doctor. There he also finds expression for his inclinations towards literature and journalism and in 1891 he founds the newspaper El Alacrán with his partner Alfredo Baptista Quevedo. He also encouraged the creation of an association of gentlemen from Táchira in the state of Mérida called La Colonia Tachirense, to which young men such as Pedro María Morantes, Horacio Castro, Abel Santos, and Eduardo Santos belonged.

In 1893 he completed his university studies at the old University of Valencia where he graduated as a Doctor in Medical Sciences after presenting his thesis in Latin, which was later published by the university. In 1900, Samuel Darío Maldonado receives the news that his brother, General Buenaventura Macabeo Maldonado, is seriously ill. He travels to Caracas to see him, but in Maracaibo he is captured by officers of the government of President Cipriano Castro and transferred to La Rotunda prison, where he remained captive for a few months. In the story "Una excursión por el Caris" ["A tour of El Caris"] (1970) Maldonado gives his testimony about his escape from prison. Upon reuniting with his brother, with the help of Jacinto Pastrón, both escape on a schooner to Curaçao.

Once in Curaçao, the Maldonado brothers embarked to Barranquilla, where they decided to separate: General Buenaventura Maldonado moved to Cúcuta, where he died a few months later, and Samuel Darío Maldonado traveled to Europe to continue his medical studies. However, there are different versions regarding the places and dates of such studies. According to one of his biographers, Alberto Silva Álvarez, and the American historian William M. Sullivan, Maldonado specialized in otorhinolaryngology and ophthalmology in the United States between 1894 and 1898. Juan Contreras Serrano points out that it was in Europe where he carried out these specializations (Paris, Vienna, and Berlin).

== Professional path ==
=== Medicine ===
Back in Venezuela, he began to work as a surgeon for the Supreme Headquarters of the Army. Between 1910 and 1911, together with Lisandro López Viloria, he decided to practice his profession as an itinerant doctor and began to treat patients in the interior of the country, especially in the Andean states of Venezuela and in the Colombian cities of Cúcuta and Pamplona. According to the historian Alberto Silva Álvarez (1977) in Buenaventura Macabeo Maldonado y Samuel Darío Maldonado, hijos ilustres de Ureña [Buenaventura Macabeo Maldonado and Samuel Darío Maldonado, illustrious sons of Ureña], he explains that Dr. Samuel Darío Maldonado modified the ophthalmoscope and adapted it by adding a tongue depressor with automatic closure. He also performed priority operations such as trephination of the sphenoid sinuses through the nose, scraping of the vocal cords, correction of advanced strabismus and dejection, Stake's operation for suppurative mastoiditis and Jansen's operation for frontal sinusitis.

=== Public Office ===
During the government of General Juan Vicente Gómez, Maldonado was recognized as a man loyal to the Gomecista cause and served in different public positions until the day of his death. In 1908 he was appointed Minister of Public Instruction and carried out a reform of the educational system of the time. The purpose of such reform was the elaboration of a curriculum with modern methods and new ways of approaching pedagogy. A year later he founded the Zamora School, which served as a model for other institutions.

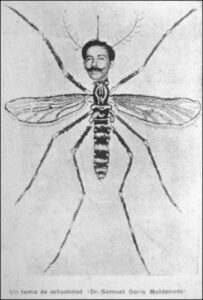
Caricature of Samuel Darío Maldonado published in the newspaper El Cojo Ilustrado (1912)

In April of that year, he presented a report on his administration up to that point and offered a general diagnosis of the state of Venezuelan public education. He proposed a new educational program, clarifying before the Legislative Chamber that it was necessary to give priority to cultural institutions such as the Schools of Arts and Trades since they would be a key piece in the industrialization process of Venezuela. He finished his term as Minister in 1910 and was appointed Governor of the state of Amazonas. On February 6, 1911, he arrived in San Fernando de Atabapo where he undertook an arduous journey to inspect a practically wild territory. There he studied different indigenous communities and prepared reports on the situation of the Amazonian peoples in Venezuelan territory, recording the number of communities existing at the time. In addition, Maldonado issued the report "Informe sobre el Balatá y su explotación en el Territorio Amazonas" (1911) ["Report on the balatá tree and its exploitation in the Amazon Territory" (1911)] where the different conflicts affecting the indigenous communities at that time are exposed and where he gives indications for a protection and awareness plan.

During his administration, he promulgated laws against the exploitation of rubber and the indigenous slavery that persisted in the area. These laws were in force until the end of Maldonado's term as governor. According to the author Carlos Lollet in Breve historia de la Bolsa de Caracas [Brief History of the Caracas Stock Exchange] (1977), this and other reports written by Maldonado during his term as Governor of Amazonas have been used as reference materials in different academic specialties.

That same year, in addition to serving as Governor of Amazonas, Maldonado was appointed Director of the National Health Office (Oficina Nacional de Sanidad) by order of the Minister of Internal Relations, General Francisco Linares Alcántara. At that time, the sanitary situation of the country was quite precarious due to the frequent outbreaks of bubonic plague, yellow fever, smallpox and malaria that depleted the population. Aware of the sanitary problems that afflicted the country, Samuel Darío Maldonado, through this institution, carried out a modernization of the Venezuelan sanitary system that resulted in improvements in public health services.

Also, the National Health Office, under Maldonado's regency, issued statistic reports with epidemiological indexes; implemented a health certificate for workers; promulgated the first Health Law in Venezuela (1912); organized antiviral and antituberculosis vaccination campaigns, as well as an offensive against hookworm and malaria; achieved the free importation of quinine and its free distribution to combat the expansion of malaria; created the first Laboratory of Bacteriology and the Department of Bromatological Chemistry. During this period the institution also carried out environmental sanitation and pest control (mosquitoes and flies) and outreach activities to educate on hygienic practices, among other achievements.

Among the sanitary campaigns led by Maldonado, the campaign for the eradication of yellow fever and bubonic plague stands out. This campaign was harshly criticized for its environmental sanitation measures—like the felling of banana, plantain, and papaya trees, and other types of vegetation that contributed to the formation of mosquito-breeding sites—for being considered drastic and exaggerated. Dr. Maldonado received criticism and ridicule in the national press and even anonymous threats. Faced with this state of things, on February 2, 1912, Maldonado published articles in the newspapers El Universal and El Tiempo inviting physicians and detractors of the campaign to present their arguments on scientific grounds.

On February 12 of the same year, he gave a lecture on general sanitation and yellow fever at the Fine Arts Academy Hall in Caracas, amid jokes and protests from the detractors. At this event, Maldonado presented the statistics of the campaign, which revealed its progress. Despite the criticisms received the National Health Office carried out the campaign, and in April 1912 the institution announced to the Ministry of Internal Relations the eradication of the yellow fever epidemic in Caracas.

On the other hand, during his three years (1911–1914) as director of the National Health Office, Maldonado was also in charge of directing and editing the monthly sanitary and demographic report, which from 1918 onwards would be known as the National Health Bulletin. This publication was an important means of publicizing the activities and efforts of the institution. In 1914 he finished his service as director of the National Health Office. In 1918 he served as governor of the state of Delta Amacuro, and in 1921 he was appointed President of the state of Aragua. In 1925 he was a Senator for the state of Táchira.

=== Literary career ===
From an early age, Samuel Darío Maldonado professed an interest in literature. According to the book Gente del Táchira [People of Táchira] by literary critic Rafael Angarita Arvelo (1974), it is estimated that he began his literary practice when he arrived in Mérida to study medicine. There, he founded two newspapers, Madrépora (1884) and El Alacrán (1890), and together with other university classmates he kept them active during most of his career. Later, in Caracas, Maldonado began to publish poetry and polemic articles in the iconic Venezuelan newspaper El Cojo Ilustrado. There, he published most of the poems that were compiled in Odas Vírgenes (his best-known collection of poems, which includes "Los Parias", "El poema de la almohada", "Buitre", among other compositions). The poem "Luis Cardozo" is one of his best-known works and was published in Poesías (1970), where Maldonado's poetic works up to 1912 were collected.

Throughout his life, Samuel Darío Maldonado remained constant in producing literary works. He wrote short stories, articles, and reviews, some of which have been published. Gonzalo Picón Febres (1977) in Buenaventura Macabeo y Samuel Darío Maldonado, hijos ilustres de Ureña [Buenaventura Macabeo y Samuel Darío Maldonado, Illustrious Sons of Ureña] explains that his poems are characterized by the use of words that did not appear in the Dictionary of the Royal Spanish Academy, as well as the Hispanicization of idioms, indigenous proverbs, and Latin words. In 1920, while governor of Delta Amacuro, he finished writing his first novel Tierra Nuestra [Our Land], which was published in 1921. The poet Mariano Picón Salas states concerning this novel:

"Venezuela, as seen and suffered by Samuel Darío Maldonado, parades in that narrative journey; the cultured and the barbarian, the mysteries of the primitive races and the polemics of the wise men; a Venezuelan typology that goes from the decadent literary man of Caracas to the dangerous and surly civil chief of a village and the most modest school teacher. If any book in Venezuela would deserve a detailed linguistic study, for its refranero [collection of proverbs], its vernacular verses, its folkloric mass, it is this one by Maldonado." -Mariano Picón Salas.

=== Anthropology and Ethnology ===
Samuel Darío Maldonado conducted several anthropological and ethnological research projects in the country which were greatly influenced by the positivist thought that prevailed in Venezuela at that time. Some authors (Carlos M. Lollet, Gonzalo Picón Febres, Mariano Picón Salas, among others) considered Samuel Darío Maldonado as part of the third generation of Venezuelan positivist intellectuals, along with other men like Laureano Vallenilla Lanz and Pedro Manuel Arcaya.

Maldonado's research specialization was indigenous ethnology, with an emphasis on the indigenous communities of Guayana. In addition, he wrote several scientific works that give testimony to his anthropological research in the Venezuelan east and jungle territory. Among his works stand out Defensa de la Antropología General y de Venezuela [An Argument for General and Venezuelan Anthropology] and Descubrimiento del hueso de Incas en el territorio de Venezuela y en el Estado Lara [Finding of the Inca bone in Venezuelan territory and the state of Lara], both published in 1906. In both studies, Maldonado made statements on the concept of race which are based on the examinations he made of the collection of skulls from the Aguada Grande Cemetery (Lara state), which had been gathered by the Lara physician and researcher Rafael Freitez Pineda, as referred by Luis Molina (1990).

On the other hand, the essay Defensa de la Antropología General y de Venezuela refutes the theories put forward by Doctor José Gil Fortoul in the book El hombre y la historia: ensayo de sociología venezolana [Man and History: an Essay on Venezuelan Sociology] (1905) about race and anthropophagy, as well as his perspective on the origin and sociocultural characteristics of the Venezuelan aboriginal peoples. Maldonado, based on several anthropometric data, argues that in the pre-Columbian period, several races populated the Venezuelan territory, in contrast to Gil Fortoul's ideas of the existence of a single race with variations in the American continent. The discussion between Gil Fortoul and Maldonado is considered an example of the influence that various anthropological and sociological currents of the nineteenth century had in the field of Venezuelan anthropology and social sciences. In the case of Maldonado, his ethnological and anthropological research can be connected to nineteenth-century French physical anthropology, as well as to the German diffusionist school.

Maldonado was also an active member of the Venezuelan Society of Americanists, a research group dedicated to anthropology, linguistics, ethnology, folklore, and other related sciences. In addition, he was editor of the Revista De Re Indica (1918), the organization's magazine.

=== Other lines of work ===
A less studied aspect of Samuel Darío Maldonado's trajectory has been his interest in occult practices. Rafael Angarita Arvelo (1977) defines him as a "spiritualist researcher". Maldonado participated in spiritualist rites in Aragua, believed in magic, and even practiced palmistry. This earned him harsh criticism because the Venezuelan society of the time thought of these practices as incompatible with the exercise of science. Angarita Arvelo points out that Maldonado's approach to such practices always had scientific purposes.

== Death ==
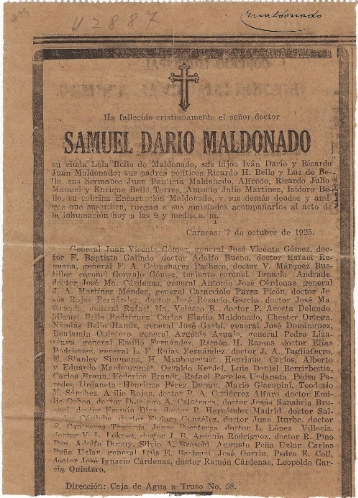
Dr. Samuel Darío Maldonado's obituary

On October 6, 1925, Samuel Darío Maldonado died in the city of Caracas at the age of 55, due to a perforation caused by Ulcers in his stomach. The government of Juan Vicente Gómez decreed official mourning for the death of Maldonado, who at that time was Senator for the state of Táchira, and sent condolences to his wife, Mrs. Lola Bello de Maldonado. His funeral procession was surrounded by men close to the Gomecista regime, and in the state of Aragua public mourning was declared to honor his work as president.

== Legacy ==
Samuel Darío Maldonado married Doña Dolores "Lola" Bello Torres in 1911, at the age of 45, with whom he had two sons: Dr. Iván Darío Maldonado and the physician, diplomat, and opera singer Ricardo Juan Maldonado.

Samuel Darío Maldonado is considered one of the most important physicians, researchers, public officials, and poets of his time. He made relevant contributions to the field of health science, as well as to the social sciences (anthropology and ethnology) in Venezuela.

In the Pitonal ranch (state of Táchira) there was a plaque in commemoration of Maldonado, and the Main Avenue of Ureña was named after the doctor in his memory. The Maldonado Municipality, founded in 1972, is one of the twenty-nine municipalities of the state of Táchira. In 1911, Maldonado acquired the El Frío Ranch in Apure State where, years later, his son Iván Darío Maldonado would create the El Frío Biological Station (1977), the first of its kind in Venezuela.

On the other hand, some schools and hospitals have been named in his honor: the Samuel Darío Maldonado Hospital in Táchira, the Samuel Darío Maldonado Elementary School, and the Samuel and Lola Maldonado Music School (both schools located in Ureña). Currently, most of his literary and scientific work is held in the Archives of the Maldonado family.

== Published works ==
- Tierra Nuestra (Por el Río Caura) [Our Land (By the Caura River)]. Litografía del Comercio. Caracas, 1920.
- Obras Varias [Various Works]. Biblioteca de Temas y Autores Tachirenses. Caracas, 1961.
- Tierra Nuestra (Por el Río Caura) [Our Land (By the Caura River)]. Presidency of the Republic. Caracas, 1970.
- Ensayos [Essays]. Edition of the Ministry of Education. Caracas, 1970.
- Poesías. [Poetry]. National Institute of Culture and Fine Arts. Caracas, 1970.
- Antonio José De Sucre. Samuel Darío Maldonado (Translator), Sherwell, Guillermo. Banco Industrial de Venezuela, Caracas, 1970.
- Temas Antropológicos, Etnológicos y otras obras [Anthropological, Ethnological, and other works]. Samuel Darío Maldonado. Compiled by Luis Ricardo Dávila. Universidad de los Andes (ULA). Mérida, 2007.

== See also ==
- Buenaventura Macabeo Maldonado Vivas
