= Iván Darío Maldonado Bello =

Venezuelan lawyer and businessman (1913–2007)

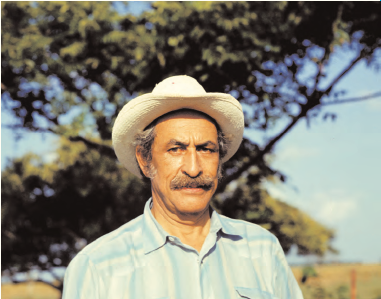
- Iván Darío Maldonado Bello at the El Frío ranch.

Director of Livestock – Ministry of Agriculture and Breeding

Governor of Carabobo

Personal details
- Born: January 28, 1913 Venezuela Caracas, Caracas, Venezuela, Venezuela, Venezuela
- Died: September 8, 2007 (aged 94) Miami, Florida, US
- Spouse(s): Elsa Blaubach Horocks, Martha Santeliz
- Children: Marcos Maldonado González, Milagros Maldonado Blaubach, Álvaro Maldonado Blaubach, Juan Maldonado Blaubach, Alonso Maldonado Blaubach.
- Parent(s): Samuel Darío Maldonado Vivas and Dolores Bello Torres
- Profession: Ph.d. in political sciences
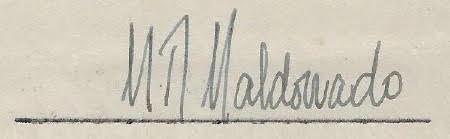
- Signature
- Website: http://maldonadofamily.com/en/family/

Iván Darío Maldonado Bello (Caracas, Venezuela, January 28, 1913 – Miami, United States, September 8, 2007) was a Venezuelan lawyer and businessman. He is known for his contributions to the Venezuelan agriculture and livestock industry, his career as a businessman in the banking and insurance sectors, and his work as a conservationist. He also served as Director of Livestock at the Ministry of Agriculture and Breeding (1940) and as Governor of the state of Carabobo (1957).

== Biography ==
Iván Darío Maldonado Bello was born on January 28, 1913, in Caracas. He was the son of Venezuelan physician, anthropologist, writer, and politician Samuel Darío Maldonado Vivas and Dolores (Lola) Bello de Maldonado. He was the brother of physician, businessman, diplomat, and opera singer Ricardo Juan Maldonado Bello.

His first son is Marcos Maldonado González, whom he had with Mercedes González. On October 3, 1943, he married Elsa Blaubach Horrocks; from this union were born: Milagros, Álvaro, Juan, and Alonso. In partnership with his children, he later established a family investment model that allowed him to expand his business projects nationally and internationally (United States).

On August 24, 1985, he married Martha Santeliz, who accompanied him until his last days. On September 8, 2007, Maldonado died in Miami (U.S.).

=== Education ===
His high school studies were interrupted due to his participation in the political events involving the Generation of 1928. For this reason, when he was fifteen years old he was transferred to the Araira Colony —this place functioned during the dictatorship of Juan Vicente Gómez as a forced labor camp. Manuel Acosta Silva (1970) in Historias del 28 [Accounts of the ‘28] states that at the beginning of October 1928, 172 students were sent to this colony in three groups. In the third group, known as "of the 32", was Iván Darío.

He remained at the Araira Colony until March 1929, when he was transferred to the San Felipe Castle in Puerto Cabello, which functioned as a prison during the Gomecista period. He was released along with other students in November 1929. Upon leaving prison he traveled with his mother to Germany.

It is presumed that he returned to Venezuela before 1932 and that he obtained his Bachelor's degree at the Andrés Bello High School in Caracas that year. However, he also received the title of Bachelor in Philosophy in 1934 from Dr. Placido Daniel Rodriguez.

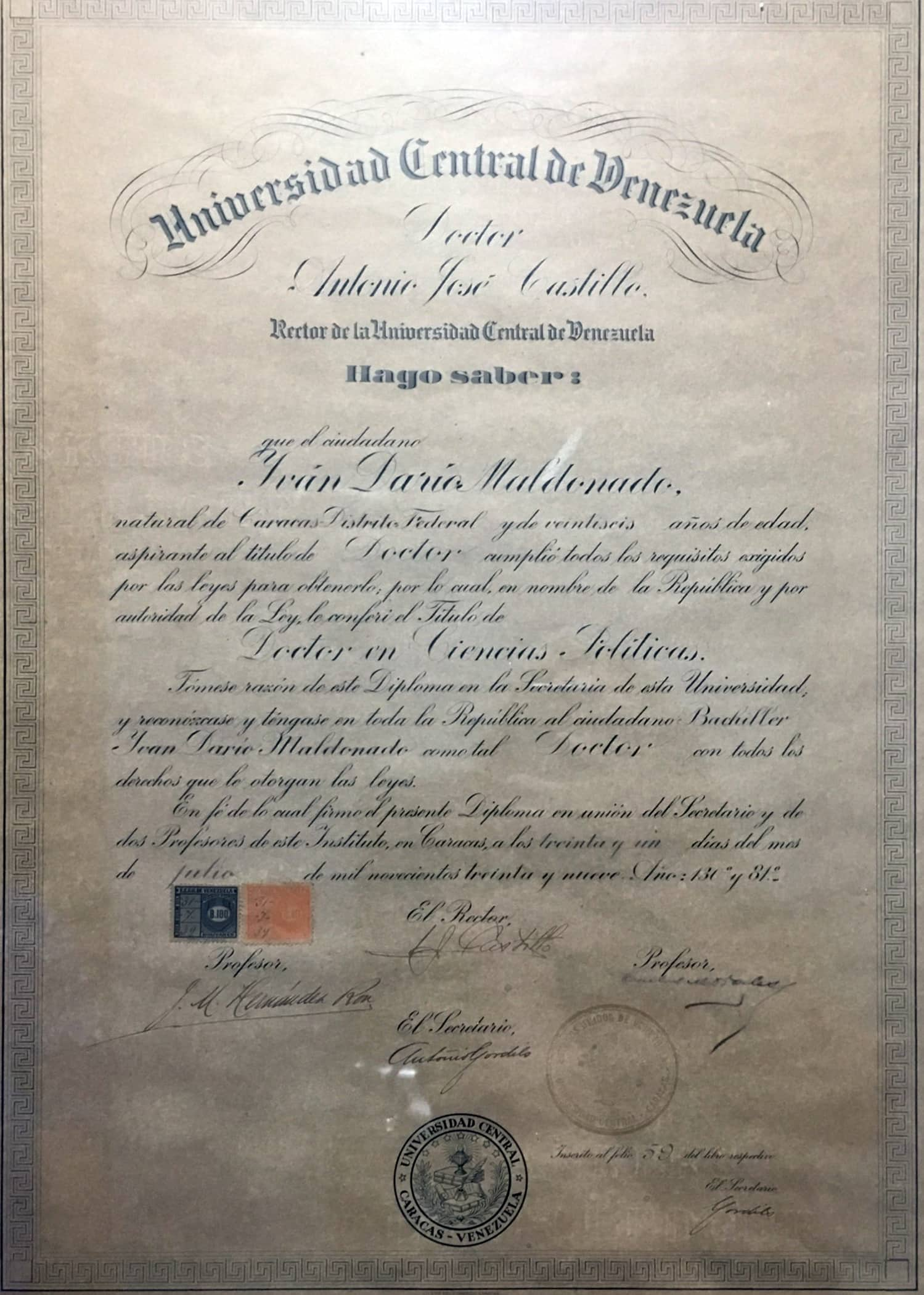
Law Degree of Dr. Iván Darío Maldonado.

That same year he took the first course of Animal Health Practices taught in Venezuela, considered to be the formal beginning of veterinary medicine in the country and which gave way, years later, to the creation of the Faculty of Veterinary Sciences (1959) of the Central University of Venezuela (UCV). On December 20, at age 21, he received his diploma as "Practitioner in Animal Health" from Dr. Vladimir Kubes.

In 1936 he studied accounting at the Caracas School of Commerce, and statistics at the Central University of Venezuela.

In July 1939 he obtained the degree of Doctor in Political Sciences from the Central University of Venezuela, after the presentation of his thesis entitled "Credit for agricultural production: legal structure, usual forms". Among the jury were Arturo Uslar Pietri, Eduardo López V. and Tito Gutiérrez Alfaro, who recommended its publication. It was published by Editorial Condor (1939). In August of the same year, he was granted his law degree by the Supreme Court of the Federal District.

In 1941 he studied at the Boca del Río Military Aviation School in Maracay, and in 1943 he took a course on grazing lands at the University of Pennsylvania in the United States.

== Professional career ==
=== Livestock farming ===
In the late thirties and early forties, Maldonado began his cattle-raising activity with the management of the El Frío ranch (Spanish: hato El Frío), a family property acquired in 1911 by his father. This was the first of a complex network of cattle production units that would expand over several states of the country. In addition to El Frío, he was also in charge of the ranches Santo Cristo, Los Yopitos, Santa Cruz, El Socorro, Paya, Barrera, María Dolores, Espinito, Corralito, Manirito, Menoreño, and Los Samanes.

In 1939, he became a founding member of the National Cattlemen's Association and the National Cooperative Livestock Farming Association (Ganadera Nacional Cooperativa, GANACO) created by cattlemen from Apure. This association was known for initiating the aerial transport of cattle from the plains to the capital to avoid diseases, as well as for transporting meat by the same route to the markets in the center of the country.

In 1940, as Director of Livestock at the Ministry of Agriculture and Breeding (MAC), he organized the First Convention of Regional Veterinarians.

In the early 70s, Maldonado became interested in the research and contributions to the improvement of cattle breeds made by the South African zootechnician Jhan Bonsma, who since 1937 had been working on the creation of the Bonsmara breed. In 1973 he acquired a piece of land and started his cattle breeding activity in South Africa to learn the principles and techniques of South African cattle breeding, and to work on the improvement of the Venezuelan livestock process; there he created the agricultural company Ven-Africa, which is currently a private animal reserve and a location for ecoturism.

In 1991, Maldonado was one of the founding members of the Venezuelan Meat Council, an association created on June 20 in the state of Miranda. Journalist Alfredo Fermín (1999) commented the following in the newspaper El Carabobeño about Dr. Maldonado's contribution to cattle ranching:

"Iván Darío Maldonado is a man who made a great fortune through hard work. Fifty years ago, from his ranch El Frío in the state of Apure, he took a herd of 700 cattle to Villavicencio, near Bogotá, to sell his products after a 45-day journey on horseback. In a farm he has very close to Valencia, called Barrera, he cultivated, for the first time in our country, the Brachiaria Decumbens grass, and introduced the crossbreeding of Zebu cattle. He also industrialized capybara breeding, for which he had artificial lakes made—which did not exist in the plains—because these animals only reproduce in water and at times when it does not rain in the region".

Iván Darío Maldonado is also known for being one of the first cattlemen to acquire Brahman cattle in Texas and Louisiana (United States), which he started doing in the 1950s.

=== Inversiones Venezolanas Ganaderas (INVEGA) ===
In 1948, he led a group of Venezuelan cattle ranchers to form Inversiones Venezolanas Ganaderas [Venezuelan Livestock Investment] (INVEGA), a company dedicated to the breeding, raising, and fattening of cattle, as well as to scientific research on the improvement of cattle breeds and the cultivation of various types of pasture (agrostology). The company's contributions include the introduction of the first Brahman cattle herds to the country, as well as the introduction of pasture varieties that would contribute to the optimization of herd health.

The company's properties cover an extension that goes from El Samán de Apure to the city of Valencia. In 1962, Iván Darío Maldonado achieved a partnership with Nelson Rockefeller's NAFARMS company, thus creating MALNAR LIMITED (Maldonado – Nelson Rockefeller). The partnership lasted until 1977. INVEGA currently continues its commercial and industrial cattle raising activities, to which it has added buffalo cattle raising.

=== Industrias Lácteas de Carabobo (INLACA) ===
A year later (1949) he again led a group of cattle ranchers, this time belonging to the state of Carabobo, to found on May 5, 1949, the company Industrias Lácteas de Carabobo [Dairy Industries of Carabobo] (INLACA) in association with the company International Basic Economic Corporation (IBEC), owned by the Rockefeller family. This was the first pasteurized milk company in the country. This company is still active, but it ceased to be owned by the Maldonado family in 2019.

=== Business career ===
His business career began in agribusiness, specifically with livestock activity, then expanded to private banking and insurance. Among the positions held and companies founded by Maldonado, the following stand out:

- President and founder of Inversiones Venezolanas Ganaderas (C.A. INVEGA, 1948) Valencia
- Founder and director of Banco Carabobo
- Director of Banco Miranda and Banco de Aragua
- Director of International Basic Economic Corporation IBEC (United States)—company founded by Nelson Rockefeller and his brothers for the development, distribution, and commercialization of the agricultural industry.
- President and founder of the international agricultural and livestock company NARFARMS (1962)
- Director and founder in Venezuela of a subsidiary of Hunter and Huggins International Insurance Brokerage Company
- President and shareholder of Seguros La Previsora (Venezuela, 1970)
- Shareholder of Seguros Los Andes.

== Wildlife conservation ==
=== El Frío ranch ===
The El Frío ranch (Spanish: hato El Frío), a property acquired by his father in 1911, is a plain of 76,000 hectares located in Apure State, between El Samán and Mantecal. It belongs to the company Inversiones Venezolanas Ganaderas (INVEGA) and the Maldonado family. The flora of this ranch includes more than 300 species, 200 of which are aquatic plants. The fauna includes 319 species of birds, 200 species of fish, 20 amphibians, more than 80 species of mammals, and 29 species of reptiles.

Since Maldonado took over El Frío, he applied wildlife conservation rules. He prohibited the keeping of dogs in the ranch, firearms, and the killing, capture, or trade of wild animals, as well as putting them in captivity. His measures generated a great increase in the fauna of El Frío. His management model was based on the fact that productivity depended on light, temperature, topography, and water. For this reason, he promoted a system based on the construction of embankments to retain water and ensure better ecological conditions.

=== El Frío Biological Station ===
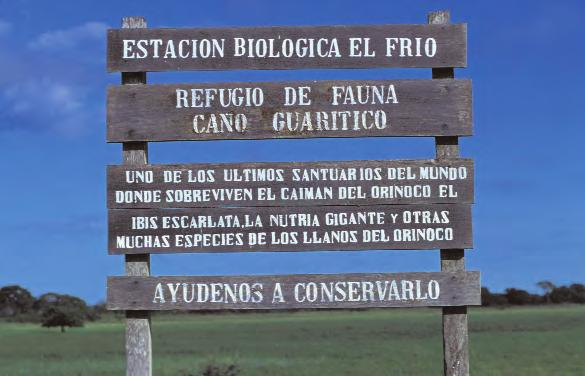
Entry sign of the El Frío Biological Station

Together with biologist Javier Castroviejo, he created the El Frio Biological Station (EBEF) in 1977. The main objectives were the conservation of the national flora and fauna as well as the promotion of Venezuela and its plains at the national and international level. Dozens of documentaries, more than a dozen doctoral theses, 20 undergraduate theses, dozens of presentations at conferences, Master's courses, informative publications, and more than 200 scientific publications were carried out in its facilities.

It was also the site of field practices in five editions of the Master's Degree in Biodiversity Management in the Tropics, a program with scholarships for Latin American students promoted and financed by the Carolina Foundation with the academic coordination of the Amigos de Doñana Association and the support of the San Pablo CEU University, UNESCO, and the Amigos de Doñana Association itself.

The station also pioneered the Program for the Reintroduction and Conservation of the Orinoco Caiman (Crocodylus intermedius). It also facilitated and financed research projects of various national and international institutions such as the Central University of Venezuela, Simón Bolívar University, University of the Andes, Experimental University of the Plains Ezequiel Zamora, University of Sevilla, University of Copenhagen, and the Real Jardín Botánico de Madrid.

The station ceased operations in April 2009, when President Hugo Rafael Chávez Frías ordered the occupation and eviction of the property on March 31.

== Public office ==
=== Director of the Ministry of Agriculture and Breeding ===
In 1940, while Director of Livestock in the Ministry of Agriculture and Breeding (MAC) (during the presidency of Eleazar López Contreras), he organized the I Convention of Veterinary Doctors. According to Pedro E. Piñate B., quoted by Carlos Ruiz Martínez (1966) in Veterinaria Venezolana [Venezuelan Veterinary Science], the results of this convention were the following:

"In that first Convention of Regional Veterinary Doctors, in September 1940, two resolutions were adopted, which showed how progressive those colleagues were: 1. To initiate in Venezuela practical work on the method of artificial insemination, of great transcendence in the progress of the livestock industry since it simultaneously improves and increases breeding. 2. To disseminate among breeders the most usual methods for conserving pastures in haystacks or hayfields, in anticipation of the shortage, which would become more feasible with the increase in production, providing the animals with good food throughout the year."

=== Governor of Carabobo[edit] ===
In 1957 he was governor of Carabobo state during the presidency of Marcos Pérez Jiménez. In this position, he decreed the foundation of the Valencia Metropolitan Park Promotion Board and commissioned the topographic survey and cadastre of the area affected by the park to the company Cartográfica Mercator. In 1958, after the coup against the government of Marcos Pérez Jiménez, he ceased his functions.

== See also ==
- Samuel Darío Maldonado Vivas
