= Buenaventura Macabeo Maldonado Vivas =

Venezuelan military man and politician (1854–1901)

Buenaventura Macabeo Maldonado
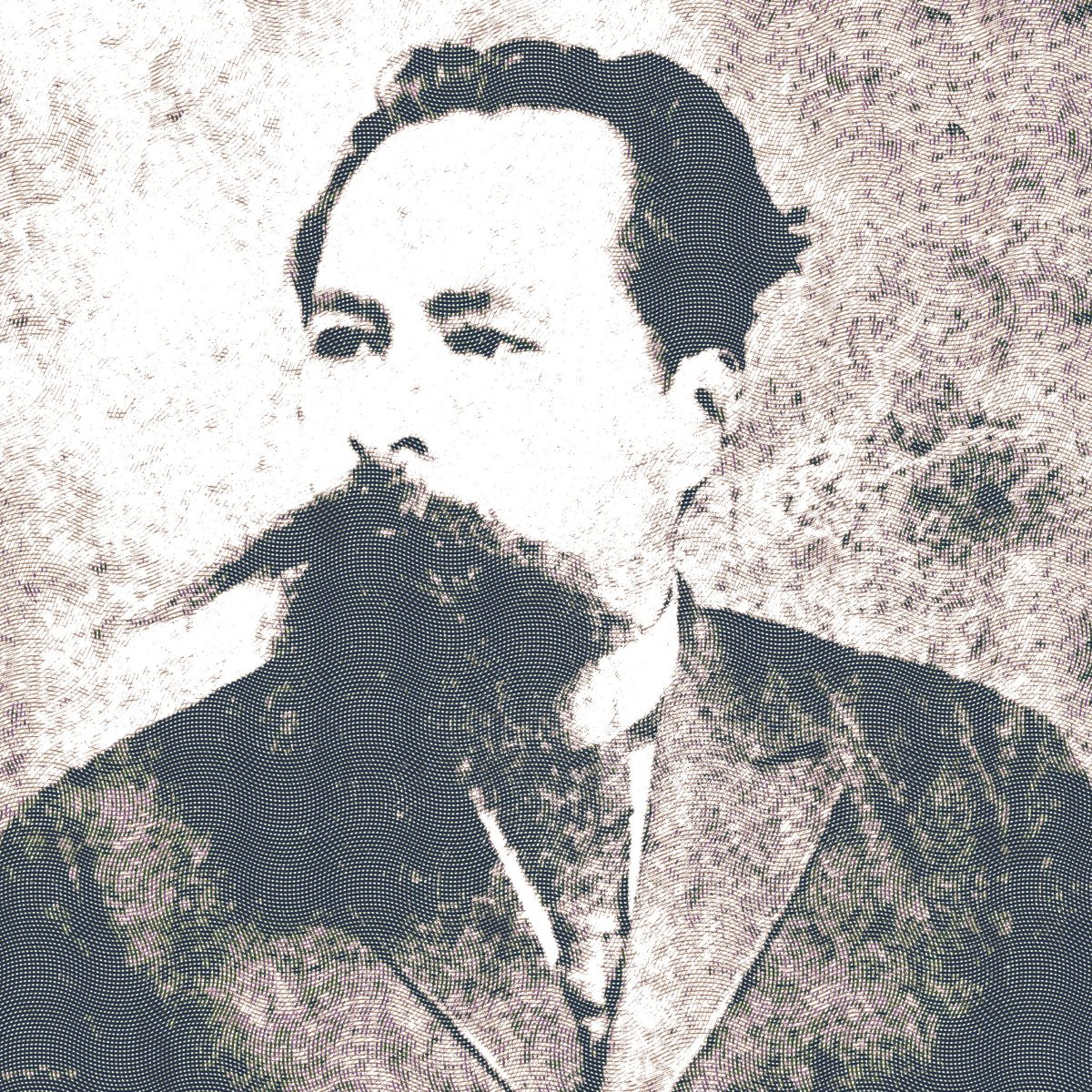
- Buenaventura Macabeo Maldonado Vivas in 1887.

Venezuela Member of the Venezuelan Chamber of Deputies for the state of Táchira
- Deputy: 1878–1881
- Deputy: 1893–1896

Personal details
- Born: 1854 Venezuela Ureña, Táchira, Venezuela
- Died: December 19, 1901 (aged 46–47) Cúcuta, Santander Department, Colombia
- Relations: Samuel Darío Maldonado Vivas (Brother)
- Children: Aminta Maldonado Cornelia Maldonado de Parra Petra Maldonado de Buenaño
- Occupation: Military officer and politician

Buenaventura Macabeo Maldonado Vivas (Ureña, Venezuela, 1854 – Cúcuta, Colombia, December 19, 1901) was a Venezuelan military man and politician, and a key figure in the political and military conflicts of the Venezuelan and Latin American Andes.

In Venezuela he worked as a congressman, representing the state of Táchira (in the years 1878, 1880, 1881, 1893, and 1896); he was a columnist for various periodical publications, and founded and directed the newspaper El Republicano; he co-founded the Republican Party in an alliance with supporters of Carlos Rangel Garbiras and José Manuel Hernández.

== Biography ==
Buenaventura Macabeo Maldonado was born in Ureña in 1854. Son of Juan Bautista Maldonado and Cornelia Vivas, he was the first of five children: Secundina Maldonado Vivas, Mario Maldonado Vivas, Juan Maldonado Vivas, and Samuel Darío Maldonado Vivas.

Some aspects of Buenaventura Maldonado's life are still unclear, like those related to his offspring. He's known to have fathered several children, three of them acknowledged: Aminta Maldonado, Cornelia Maldonado de Parra, and Petra Maldonado de Buenaño. General Maldonado had a very close relationship with Colombia, the country where he spent various periods of exile, from where he organized and launched a few military insurrections, and where he would die on December 19, 1901.

=== Military and political career ===
From his teenage years, he became linked to the Partido Liberal [Liberal Party] and took part in the political disputes for control of Venezuela's Andean region. He worked as a congressman representing the state of Táchira between 1878 and 1880; that would be the first term of his parliamentary career.

=== Military career ===
Involvement in the War of the Pacific (Saltpeter War) (1879–1884)

Halfway through 1880, one year after the start of the War of the Pacific, Buenaventura Maldonado gives up his parliamentary duties in the Chamber of Deputies to travel to Perú and participate in favor of the interests of Peru and Bolivia, against the Chilean expansionist pretensions. There he distinguished himself for the role he played in different combats, such as the three combats in El Callao, in which he handled the artillery.

He was also distinguished by the initiatives he took to disseminate what he considered to be the just interests and claims of Peru and Bolivia against Chile, part of this dissemination was the publication of opinion articles in Peruvian and Venezuelan newspapers; this was eventually recognized by the Peruvian government. In August 1880 he sends word to his parents from Lima; a fragment of his letter reads:

“...The war has no end in sight: I believe that it is just beginning. Over there they will believe that Peru has sunk, but it has not. The reason why nothing is known of its formidable position is that the Government has forbidden the press, and private individuals in their correspondence, to communicate anything. Thus Chile will fall into the trap as you will see. In a word, Peru has already armed itself with weapons and artillery superior to that of the Chileans, introduced into the country in recent days and which everyone is unaware of”.

For his military services, the Peruvian government grants Maldonado a remuneration and he donates it to Lima's Military Hospital. At the beginning of 1881, Buenaventura returns to Venezuela and resumes his duties at Congress. There, he files a proposal to issue a Decree where he advocates for unity among American nations and for conflicts to be solved through negotiations; he also includes a motion to keep disputes within the rule of Law.

=== First exile and insurrections ===
In 1881 he was imprisoned by order of President Antonio Guzmán Blanco. As a result of this, Buenaventura Maldonado went into exile in Colombia, for a period of almost ten years during which he organized and participated in several military incursions into Venezuelan lands.

"...Exiled in Cúcuta almost permanently (1881–1892), Maldonado takes part in various uprisings..."

"...The position of second in command Maldonado had acquired [in 1886], compels us to believe that he had already been an active participant in previous martial expeditions between 1881 and 1885, which were also captained by the aforementioned general Prato"

General Maldonado took part in various insurrections against local, regional, and national governments; for example, the uprising against the Tachira government of General Espíritu Santo Morales in 1886.

=== Participation in the Legalist Revolution of 1892 ===
In 1892, General Buenaventura Maldonado participates in the battles held in Tachira during the Legalist Revolution; during this national conflict General Joaquín Crespo rises up against President Raimundo Andueza Palacio, who after the reform of the Constitution of 1891, wanted to remain in power; as stated by Tachira historian Juan Contreras Serrano (1997):

"In 1892, the year of the ‘legalist’ war, there was another military invasion of Venezuelan territory which also originated from Colombian territory, under the command of General B. Macabeo Maldonado and Colonels Andrés Bautista and Ramón Vizcaya, with weapons provided by the authorities of Cucuta, as reported by one of the leaders..."

General Maldonado led the battle of Cuchicuche, fought on 16 April 1892, which was the Legalist Revolution's last victory. After this triumph, he handed over the command of his troops to General Espiritu Santos Morales, who had been previously named chief of operations in Tachira. This division of the Legalist forces was defeated by President Andueza Palacio's army, commanded by Cipriano Castro. However, General Joaquin Crespo's Legalist army ended up dominating at a national level.

As a result of this victory, the new President of the Republic, General Joaquín Crespo, appointed General Maldonado as comptroller of the Maracaibo Customs. In 1893 Maldonado takes a parliamentary seat again as a representative of the Great State of Los Andes. He wouldn't hold that position for long, since that same year —due to internal differences with his liberal co-partisans—he decides to give up politics and retire to Cucuta, to devote himself to farming. This retirement lasted almost three years, until the beginning of 1896, when he communicates to President Joaquín Crespo his wishes of returning to political life, to work for the political progress of Venezuela and the consolidation of peace.

=== The insurrection against President Andrade in 1898 ===
General Ignacio Andrade assumes the Presidency of the Republic on February 28, 1898, after being elected in 1897, in elections considered fraudulent by followers of the Liberal Party's candidate, as well as by General José Manuel Hernández. In March of that same year, General Hernández led an uprising against the new government known as the Queipa Revolution; this had various repercussions and supporters in different parts of the country.

General Carlos Rangel Garbiras lead this fight against the new government in Táchira. General Buenaventura Maldonado came to support Rangel Garbiras from Colombia, where he was in exile. This would be the last military campaign where he would participate, since after its failure he would be captured and transferred to Caracas from where he would leave for his last exile in Colombia, where he died.

=== Political career ===
==== Representation in the National Congress ====
Buenaventura Maldonado enters the Chamber of Deputies as a representative for the state of Táchira on February 23, 1880. Later that same year, however, with the outbreak of the War of the Pacific, he leaves his parliamentary work to take part in the War in favor of Peru and Bolivia. By the beginning of 1881, he was back in Venezuela and resuming his duties in Congress. There, he files a proposal for a Decree that supports unity among American nations, and conflict resolution via negotiation, according to Contreras Serrano (1977):

"In Caracas Maldonado continued, through press and Parliament, the crusade for his Americanist ideas, defending the two Bolivarian nations in the conflict for the Pacific; he presented these ideas to the Chamber of Deputies, among other actions." (J. Contreras, 1977, p.34-35)

A few months later, he was arrested for protesting the actions of President Antonio Guzmán Blanco against State of Trujillo Senator Eusebio Baptista, who was deprived of his parliamentary immunity and incarcerated.

==== Republican Newspaper and Party ====
In 1896, simultaneously with reassuming his political duties, Buenaventura Maldonado creates and runs the semimonthly paper El Republicano. This publication becomes a battle instrument for followers of the Liberal party, led by General Juan Bautista Araujo, against General Espíritu Santo Morales’ followers. On April 18, 1896, the first issue began to circulate in San Cristóbal. In the newspaper's first issue, General Maldonado includes a declaration of principles about his recurrent involvement in regional conflicts:

“...‘If we have been men of battle, and if in twenty-two years we have been present in every armed movement in Táchira, it is not because we are enemies of the tranquility of its peoples; on the contrary: by these means, since it has not been possible by others, we have tried to implant the ideas that we have been nurturing since we were children. If we have been mistaken and other fruits have been harvested, it has not been our fault but the fault of the times and of the men with whom we have served’. He adds: ‘With the advantage exile gives —we have spent half of our lives in it—but forced in consequence to watch our homeland from the neighboring border, we have never fostered irreconcilable hatreds, and we won't stir them up it today. We are children of the people and we serve the people.’”

The following year, 1897, Buenaventura Macabeo Maldonado helps to organize the Republican party, in an alliance with Rangel Garbiras’ and General José Manuel Hernández's followers.

=== Final years ===
In October 1899 he is arrested and sent to La Rotunda prison, by mandate of the new president Cipriano Castro. Due to his precarious health condition and the repeated efforts of politicians and military officers, he was ordered to be released. He runs away with his brother Samuel Darío to Curaçao, and then Barranquilla. From there, Buenaventura Maldonado heads for Cúcuta, where he arrives in a very serious condition. He continues his exile in this city until his death on December 19 of the same year.

== Buenaventura Macabeo Maldonado's Archives ==
In his biographical text about Buenaventura Macabeo Maldonado, J.N. Contreras Serano (1997) affirms that in Ureña there was an archive with the documentation of General Maldonado, from which his niece, Blanca Maldonado de Castro, was able to keep two letters. Part of these letter's text is the following:

“Caracas, February 13, 1881.

“My dear parents:

“Ureña.

“América is in mourning, and the Argentine Republic has likely declared war on Chile since they won't allow themselves to be conquered. Here it was said that an earthquake had destroyed the capital: it is not confirmed. This wouldn't stop the war, it would just put it off some more—if that tragedy is true, which would mean that the Devil protects Chile.

“If the Argentines take revenge, it is very probable, if God grants it to me, that I will go to serve with them: I would then go across the Atlantic by way of Rio de Janeiro.

...

“Hopefully you've remembered to send the mandolin and the tiple because I'm becoming stir-crazy here. If you haven't I will have to have them made, in which case it's possible they will be of no use, just like last year.

“A hug to my sister and brothers and greetings to my friends.

Your son,

Buenaventura”

== See also ==
- Legalist Revolution
- Ciprano Castro
