= Grupo Radial Colombiano =

Columbian radio application

Grupo Radial Colombiano (Spanish: Colombian Radio Group, GRC) was a Colombian radio network founded in 1979 by brothers Miguel and Gilberto Rodríguez Orejuela, heads of the Cali Cartel. In 1984, the Rodríguez brothers transferred their stocks in the network to journalists and executives after the media published their links to the network.

GRC, which at its peak had 28 stations, would be sold in 1989 to a religious group, later becoming Colmundo Radio.
