= Cristian Pulido =

Colombian footballer (born 1991)

Personal information
- Full name: Cristian Felipe Pulido Gálvez
- Date of birth: 20 July 1991 (age 35)
- Place of birth: Trujillo, Colombia
- Height: 1.81 m (5 ft 11 1/2 in)
- Position: Forward

Team information
- Current team: Fortaleza

Youth career
- Deportes Tuluá
- 2008–2012: Cortuluá

Senior career*
Years	Team	Apps	(Gls)
2012–2013	Petrolero	28	(6)
2014	Real Cartagena	16	(1)
2015	Cortuluá	0	(0)
2015–2016	Real Potosí	7	(2)
2016	San José	0	(0)
2016–2017	Rayo Majadahonda	6	(0)
2017–	Fortaleza	4	(2)
- * Club domestic league appearances and goals as of 12 March 2017

Cristian Felipe Pulido Gálvez (born 20 July 1991) is a Colombian footballer who plays for Fortaleza C.E.I.F. as a forward.

== Club career ==
Pulido was born in Trujillo, Valle del Cauca, and represented Deportes Tuluá and Cortuluá as a youth. He made his senior debut in 2012 while playing for Bolivia's Club Petrolero.

Pulido only returned to his home country in 2014, signing for Real Cartagena. After a brief stint at former club Cortuluá he returned to Bolivia, joining Real Potosí in June 2015; he rescinded with the latter in September.

On 24 June 2016 Pulido moved to Club San José. On 16 July, however, he switched teams and countries again after agreeing to a one-year contract with Spanish Segunda División B club CF Rayo Majadahonda.
