= Henry Loaiza-Ceballos =

Colombian drug dealer

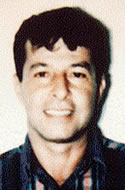
Henry Loaiza-Ceballos

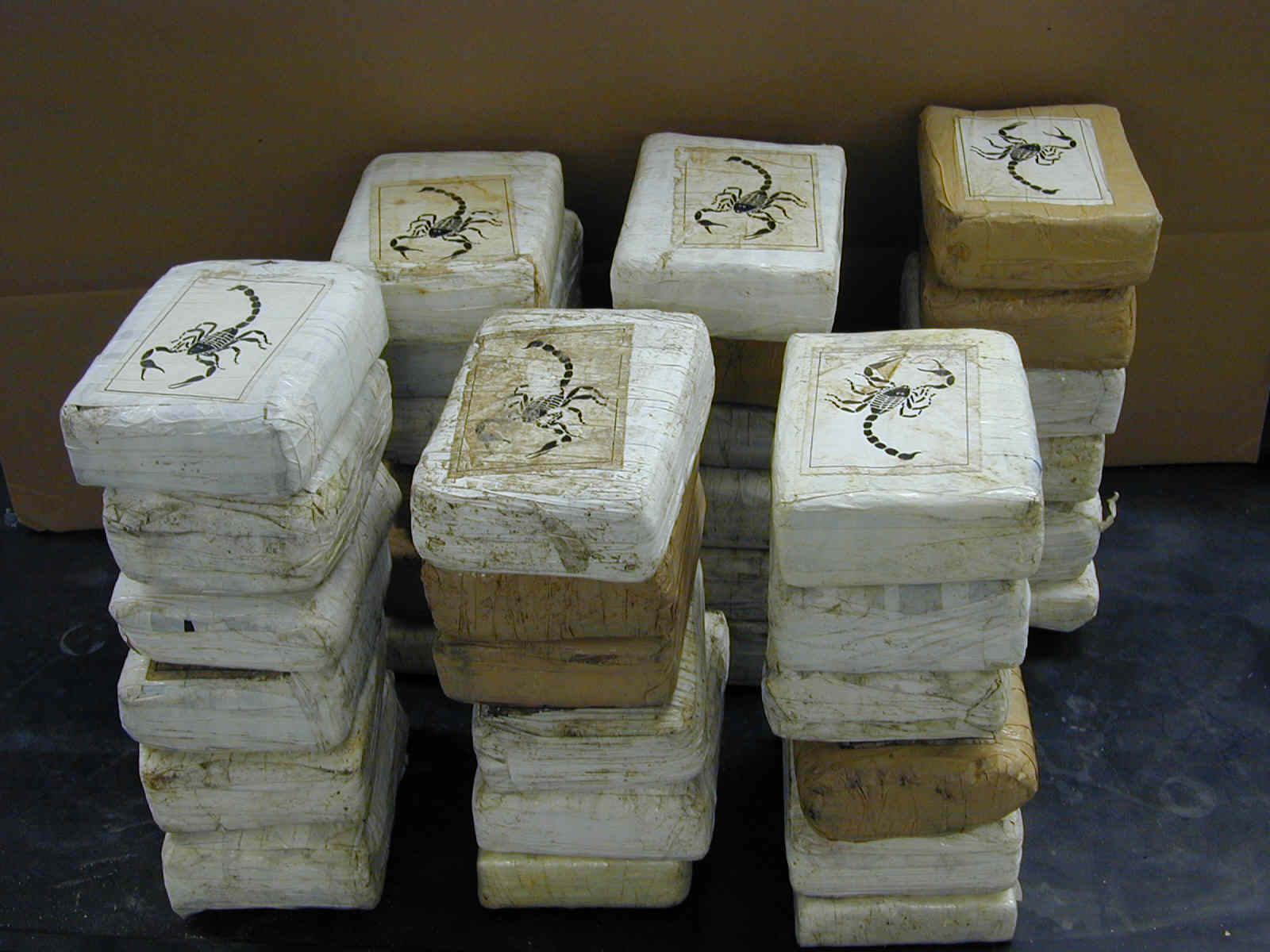
Shipment of cocaine bricks confiscated by the DEA. The logo is presumably a symbol of Loaiza-Ceballos.

Henry Loaiza Ceballos a.k.a. El Alacrán (The Scorpion) is a former Colombian drug trafficker and a member of the Cali Cartel. Loaiza was mainly in charge of the military apparatus of the organization, but was also involved in the shipment of illegal drugs.

Loaiza got involved in criminal activities in the 1980s, after moving to the Putumayo Department, and getting involved in drug trafficking. By the end of the 1980s, and having attained some power and money and becoming infamous for his cruelty, he joined the Norte del Valle Cartel, eventually becoming one of its leaders. As the Cartel was involved in a conflict over territory with the ELN guerrilla, Loaiza led a bloody campaign in the cities of Trujillo, Bolívar, and Riofrío that would last for 6 years causing many deaths in what is called the Massacre of Trujillo. Loaiza, coordinated the drug trafficking network in Trujillo, and was also infamous as a vicious torturer. Under increasing pressure from law enforcement agencies, he surrendered to Colombian authorities on June 19, 1995.

He was condemned as the author of 43 homicides and 22 kidnappings, and sentenced to 22 years in prison. He always denied his part in the massacre of Trujillo and declared to be "unjustly accused."

On August 4, 2006, a higher court in the city of Ibagué attempted to release Loaiza after serving 11 of his 18-years' sentence to prison for creating illegal paramilitary groups in the Departments of Valle del Cauca and Tolima. The National Penitentiary and Prison Institute, (INPEC) requested the Attorney General's office and the DAS Security Service to inform them of whether Loaiza had any other judicial processes against him.

A local attorney pertaining to the Life and Personal Integrity Unit in Ibagué requested a warrant once again against Loaiza for homicide, production, traffic and possession of illegal weapons and munition. Loaiza was accused of participating in the murder of former Colombian Army captain Ignasio Luis Arteaga on April 28, 2004, in Ibagué. Captain Arteaga was the security chief of a local company called Cooperative SERVIARROZ. Loaiza served his sentence in a prison in central Colombia located in the town of Cómbita, Boyacá.

On December 19, 2006, Loaiza was again accused by Colombian authorities of being responsible for the homicide of more than 100 persons, after allegedly co-authoring the Massacre of Trujillo in the southern town of Trujillo, Valle del Cauca Department in order to benefit the Cali cartel and his shipments of drugs. Most of the bodies were thrown into the waters of the Cauca River.

After spending 22 years in prison, Loaiza was released in January 2017. Loaiza moved to the town of Puerto Asís, where he declared himself a born-again Christian and attempted to create a church, and build a Christian radio station. This low profile, however, was accompanied by frequent visits by unknown individuals in luxurious motorcycles and cars, which called the attention of police officers. According to the authorities, immediately after being released he began attempting to regain control of his illicit affairs along with a dangerous criminal network known as ‘la Constru,’ involved in illicit drug traffic in the department of Putumayo, and infamous for their use of blackmail, torture, murders, and dismemberment. Eventually la Constru and members of the former 32nd and 48th Fronts merged to form the Comandos de la Frontera, with Loaiza as its first leader. Loaiza was arrested in the town of Puerto Asís along with 14 members of the organization on June 26, 2019.
