= CorpBanca Tower =

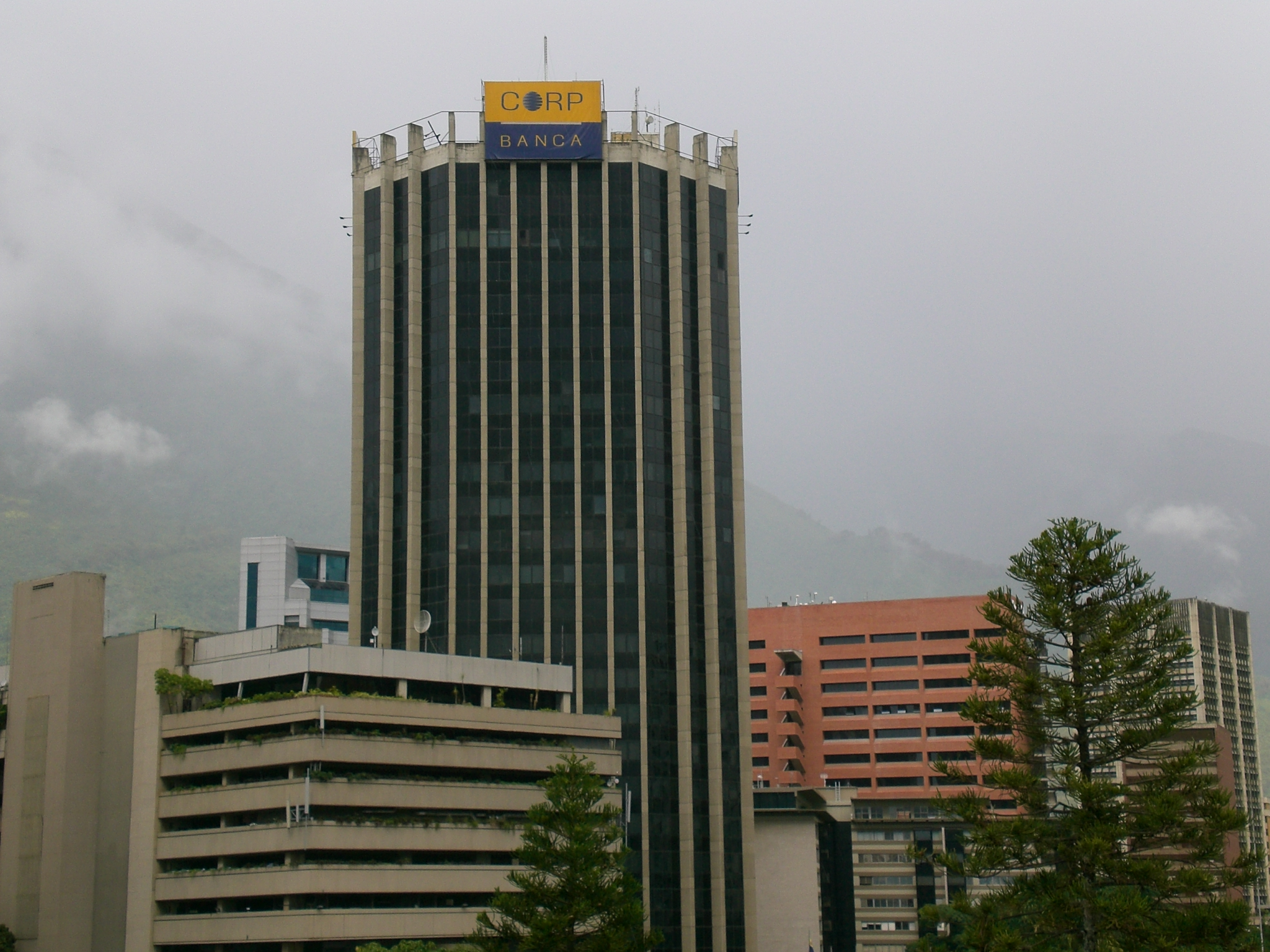
- Interactive map of the CorpBanca Tower area

General information
- Status: Completed
- Type: Office
- Location: Caracas, Venezuela
- Coordinates: 10.4981°N 66.8524°W
- Completed: 1966
- Owner: CorpBanca C. A.

Height
- Roof: 124 m (407 ft)

Technical details
- Floor count: 30
- Floor area: 3500 m²

The CorpBanca Tower (Spanish: Torre CorpBanca) is a high-rise office building located in the city of Caracas, Venezuela. It is known for being the tallest skyscraper in the Financial Center of the Golden Mile of Caracas with 124 meters and 30 floors, a title that will be held in the future by the neighboring CAF Tower, when it is completed.

== See also ==
- List of tallest buildings in South America
