= Jorge Salcedo Cabrera =

Colombian informant (born 1947)

Jorge Salcedo
- Born: Jorge Salcedo Cabrera; November 25, 1947 (age 78); Bogotá, D.C., Colombia
- Other name: Ricardo Salgado
- Education: University of Los Andes
- Occupations: Engineer, surveillance expert
- Organization: Cali Cartel (1989–1995)
- Known for: Operation Cornerstone
- Criminal status: Entered witness protection
- Military career
- Allegiance: Colombia
- Branch: National Army Reserve
- Service years: 1965–1992
- Rank: Captain

Jorge Salcedo Cabrera (born November 25, 1947) is a Colombian civil engineer, countersurveillance specialist, and former head of security for Miguel Rodríguez Orejuela and the Cali Cartel, who later became a confidential informant for the Drug Enforcement Administration. His information on the cartel—Operation Cornerstone—led to its eventual disbandment, as a result of which Salcedo and his family have entered the United States Federal Witness Protection Program.

== Early life ==
Jorge Salcedo was born on November 25, 1947, in Bogotá, Colombia. His father was a member of the Colombian military. Salcedo lived in Kansas for two years while his father attended the United States Army Command and General Staff College, after which the family moved back to Colombia. He attended the University of Los Andes, from which he earned a degree in industrial economics. He joined the Army Reserve division in Cali.

== Cali Cartel ==
=== Recruitment ===
Salcedo was invited to join the Cali Cartel in 1989, after Mario del Basto, a member of Salcedo's reserve unit, made first introductions. Salcedo had previously worked on behalf of British commandos, who worked with the Colombian government to counter the Revolutionary Armed Forces of Colombia. At this initial meeting, the Cali godfathers asked Salcedo to coordinate an attack on Pablo Escobar, a rival drug cartel leader.

The two factions agreed, and Jorge Salcedo worked with the commandos to develop a plan of attack. In May 1989, the attack was set to occur, but heavy cloud cover resulted in a helicopter crash, with most of the commandos failing to make it to Escobar's hideout, Hacienda Nápoles. The attack was subsequently called off.

=== Surveillance ===
After the failed raid Salcedo continued monitoring the communications of national police and rival cartel. In 1992, Salcedo coordinated the purchase and retrieval of several Salvadorian bombs in another plot to kill Escobar. After the transaction was discovered by national police, Salcedo was outed as a member of the Cali Cartel. He was removed from his post in the reserve. After going into hiding, Salcedo focused his efforts on monitoring his electronic communication network, extracting intelligence on both national police and the Medellín Cartel.

After Escobar was killed by national police in 1993, Salcedo considered his duty with the Cali Cartel completed, and attempted to resign. His resignation was denied by Miguel Rodríguez Orejuela, and he was forced to continue his relationship with the cartel. Whereas his previous role involved avoiding detection from Escobar's network, Salcedo now assisted Cali's men with avoiding detection by the National Police of Colombia. During this time, the Search Bloc—originally formed to hunt Escobar—focused its attention on the Cali Cartel.

In 1995, Gilberto Rodríguez Orejuela was captured by a joint task-force in Cali. The raid was conducted on the basis of documents seized during an inspection of an office that was owned and operated by Guillermo Pallomari, the cartel's chief accountant. After being ordered to kill Pallomari, Salcedo began to believe that he had no choice for leaving the operation other than its dismantling. Salcedo did not comply with his orders and pretended to not know where Pallomari was, believing Pallomari to be his bargaining chip for his freedom.

=== Cornerstone ===
Mario del Basto's arrest in 1995 promoted Salcedo to the cartel's chief of security. In that same year, Joel Rosenthal, an American lawyer who had helped the Cali Cartel with previous cases, was arrested for his connections to the cartel. Salcedo viewed this as an opportunity to begin his relationship with United States law enforcement. Rosenthal's arrest led to Salcedo being introduced to Chris Feistl and David Mitchell, two Drug Enforcement Administration (DEA) agents operating in Cali.

In July 1995, Salcedo met with Feistl and Mitchell to devise a plan to capture Miguel Rodríguez Orejuela. After Salcedo determined Rodriguez's location, the DEA agents planned a raid of the apartment complex. While the scheme was initially designed to be a surprise, bureaucracy led to a prolonged siege of the apartment which ended without an arrest. In the aftermath, Salcedo was demoted. On August 6, Salcedo and the DEA collaborated on another assault on Rodriguez, this time on the Hacienda Buenos Aires. This raid was successful, and the DEA arrested Rodriguez.

Before being extradited by the DEA, Salcedo argued that Guillermo Pallomari must be extracted. Working under the pretense of casing Pallomari for assassination, Salcedo forwarded his location to the DEA. Pallomari was hesitant to respond to the DEA's offer, fearing it to be a ploy. Only through the recruitment of his wife did Pallomari agree to leave. William Rodríguez Orejuela, Miguel's son, suspected Salcedo to be the leak, and reassigned Salcedo's responsibilities. On August 12, the DEA successfully collected Pallomari and his family.

Salcedo stayed in Colombia, awaiting diplomatic permission from the Colombia government to leave. On August 26, 1995, after six-and-a-half years with the cartel, he was extradited to the United States. He entered the Federal Witness Protection Program, where he remains to this day.

== In media ==
Salcedo was portrayed by Matias Varela in the third season of the Netflix-produced television series Narcos. Salcedo was consulted on the show, and provided feedback on the role he played in the prosecution and arrest of the Rodríguez Orejuela brothers.

The Colombian television series En la boca del lobo focuses on the years Salcedo worked for the Cali Cartel. Salcedo appears under the name of Ricardo Salgado and is portrayed by Luis Fernando Hoyos.
