= Juan Carlos Ortiz Escobar =

Colombian drug dealer

Juan Carlos Ortiz Escobar (died in 2002) a.k.a. Cuchilla was a Colombian drug dealer and high ranking member of the Cali Cartel. Ortiz-Escobar was a nephew of former Medellin Cartel boss the king of cocaine Pablo Escobar.

After the capture of Norte del Valle Cartel kingpin Juan Carlos Ramirez Abadia on August 7, 2007, Brazilian authorities discovered he had close ties to Ortiz-Escobar. Ramirez-Abadia had been helped by Ortiz-Escobar to establish himself in Brazil.

Ortiz-Escobar was killed in 2002, after getting out of jail, by orders of Wilber Varela a.k.a. Jabón after he found out that he was working with the Herrera clan who were enemies of Jabón.
