= Cali Cartel =

Former Colombian drug cartel

- Caballeros de Cali
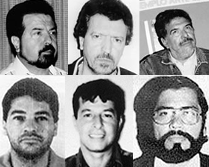
- Founded: Cali, Valle del Cauca, Colombia
- Years active: 1975–1995
- Territory: South America, Central America, Miami, New York City, Spain
- Ethnicity: Colombians
- Membership: 2,500 – 6,000
- Leaders: Gilberto Rodríguez Orejuela; Miguel Rodríguez Orejuela; José Santacruz Londoño; Hélmer "Pacho" Herrera
- Activities: Drug trafficking, bribery, money laundering, racketeering
- Allies: Guadalajara Cartel (defunct); The Extraditables (defunct); Juarez Cartel; Gulf Cartel; Camorra; Norte del Valle Cartel (later became rivals) (defunct); Los Pepes (defunct); Muerte a Secuestradores (defunct)
- Rivals: Medellín Cartel (defunct); Norte del Valle Cartel (defunct)

The Cali Cartel (Spanish: Cartel de Cali) was a Colombian drug cartel based in Cali and the Valle del Cauca in southern Colombia. Its founders were the brothers Gilberto Rodríguez Orejuela, Miguel Rodríguez Orejuela and José Santacruz Londoño. They broke away from Pablo Escobar and his Medellín associates in 1988, when Hélmer Herrera joined what became a four-man executive board that ran the cartel.

At the height of the Cali Cartel's reign from 1993 to 1995, they were cited as having control of over 80% of the world's cocaine market and were said to be directly responsible for the growth of the cocaine market in Europe, controlling 80% of the market there as well. By the mid-1990s, the leaders of the Cali Cartel were a criminal empire operating billions per year. The Cartel was considered by law enforcement to be the most powerful criminal organization in the world.

== Foundation ==
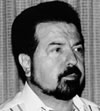
Gilberto Rodriguez Orejuela

The Cali Cartel was formed by the Rodriguez Orejuela brothers and Santacruz, all coming from what is described as a higher social background than most other traffickers of the time. The recognition of this social background was displayed in the group's nickname as "Los Caballeros de Cali" ("Gentlemen of Cali"). The group originally assembled as a ring of kidnappers known as "Las Chemas", which was led by Luis Fernando Tamayo García. Las Chemas were implicated in numerous kidnappings including those of two Swiss citizens: a diplomat, Herman Buff, and a student, Zack "Jazz Milis" Martin. The kidnappers reportedly received $700,000 in ransom, which is believed to have been used to fund their drug trafficking empire.

The assembled group first involved itself in trafficking marijuana. Due to the product's low profit rate and large amounts required to traffic to cover resources, the fledgling group decided to shift their focus to a more lucrative drug, cocaine. In the early 1980s, the cartel sent Hélmer Herrera to New York City to establish a distribution center, during a time when the United States Drug Enforcement Administration (DEA) viewed cocaine as less important than heroin.

The Cali Cartel leadership comprised members Gilberto Rodríguez Orejuela, Miguel Rodríguez Orejuela, José Santacruz Londoño and Hélmer Herrera. Some top associates were Victor Patiño Fomeque, Henry Loaiza Ceballos, ex-guerrilla member José Fedor Rey, and Phanor Arizabaleta-Arzayus.

== Organization ==
In the absence of a hardline policy from the DEA on cocaine, the trade flourished. The group developed and organized itself into multiple "cells" that appeared to operate independently yet reported to a celeno ("manager"). The independent clandestine cell system is what set the Cali Cartel apart from the Medellín Cartel. The Cali Cartel operated as a tight group of independent criminal organizations, as opposed to the Medellíns' centralised structure under leader Pablo Escobar.

The Cali Cartel eventually became "the most powerful criminal organization in the world. No drug organization rivals them today or perhaps any time in history." according to then DEA administrator Robert C. Bonner. and was called "the biggest, most powerful crime syndicate we've ever known", by Thomas Constantine respectively.

Each leader of the Cali Cartel had their own operation to run as they saw fit. There were 5 major Cali trafficking groups that were separate but also worked together when their interests aligned. This included, but was not limited to, transporting drugs to the United States and money laundering. According to a report by the DEA in 1994, the Rodriguez brothers, Miguel and Gilberto, were the most successful and powerful of the cartel's members. As such, they were also in charge of the Cali Cartel operations on a grand scale. Gilberto, known as the "Chess Player" for his ability to think strategically, oversaw the cartel's long-term plans while his younger brother handled the day-to-day operations; micromanaging every detail. While certain groups were only handling certain aspects for the cartel, the Rodriguez brothers were involved in all aspects from production to transportation to wholesale distribution to money laundering. One of the more violent of the kingpins, Jose "Chepe" Santacruz-Londono had his talent in international cocaine transportation, creating a vast network for the cocaine to get from Colombia to its final destination, most often the United States. Specifically, he had a center of US operations in New York where the DEA seized two cocaine conversion laboratories in June 1992. Next, the Urdinola brothers were possibly the most violent of the group with some estimates saying that they murdered over 100 individuals in Colombia. They also distributed cocaine throughout the United States from Los Angeles to Miami to New York City. Also, the group expanded into trafficking Colombian heroin, a product that most of the groups stayed away from. Finally, Raul and Luis Grajales, cousins by marriage, were a careful duo who tried to portray themselves as legitimate. Their operation took them to Western Europe where they tried to establish new routes from Colombia. They used Eastern Europe and old Soviet countries to route the cocaine into Western Europe. The five groups all coexisted under the name of the Cali Cartel.

== Activities ==
=== Trafficking ===
The Cali Cartel would become known for its innovations in trafficking and production, by moving its refining operations out of Colombia to Peru and Bolivia, as well as for pioneering new trafficking routes through Panama. The Cartel also diversified into opium and was reported to have brought in a Japanese chemist to help its refining operation. Venezuelan General Ramon Guillen Davila ran the Venezuelan National Guard unit that was to interdict cocaine shipments and was the CIA's most trusted narcotics asset in Venezuela. He worked with Mark McFarlin and Jim Campbell, and was charged by United States authorities with smuggling 22 tons of Cali Cartel cocaine from 1987 to 1991 known as Operation North (Spanish: Operación Norte).

According to reports and testimony of Thomas Constantine to the United States Congress, "Cali would be the dominant group in trafficking South American heroin due to their access to the opium-growing areas of Colombia." Debate over the cartel's participation in heroin trafficking remains. It is believed the cartel's leaders were not involved in heroin trading, but that close associates to them, such as Ivan Urdinola-Grajales, were, and that they cooperated with heroin distribution centers.

At the height of the Cali Cartel's reign, they were cited as having control over 80% of the world's cocaine market and for being directly responsible for the growth of the cocaine market in Europe. By the mid-1990s, the trafficking empire of the Cali Cartel was a multibillion-dollar enterprise.

After Gilberto took a trip to Spain in the mid-1980s, the cartel began to expand its activities in Europe and developed a working relationship with tobacco smugglers from Galicia, Spain. But in particular, the Cali cartel established a strategic alliance with the powerful Camorra criminal organization. Cali supplied the cocaine and the Camorra handled distribution across Europe.

=== Finances ===
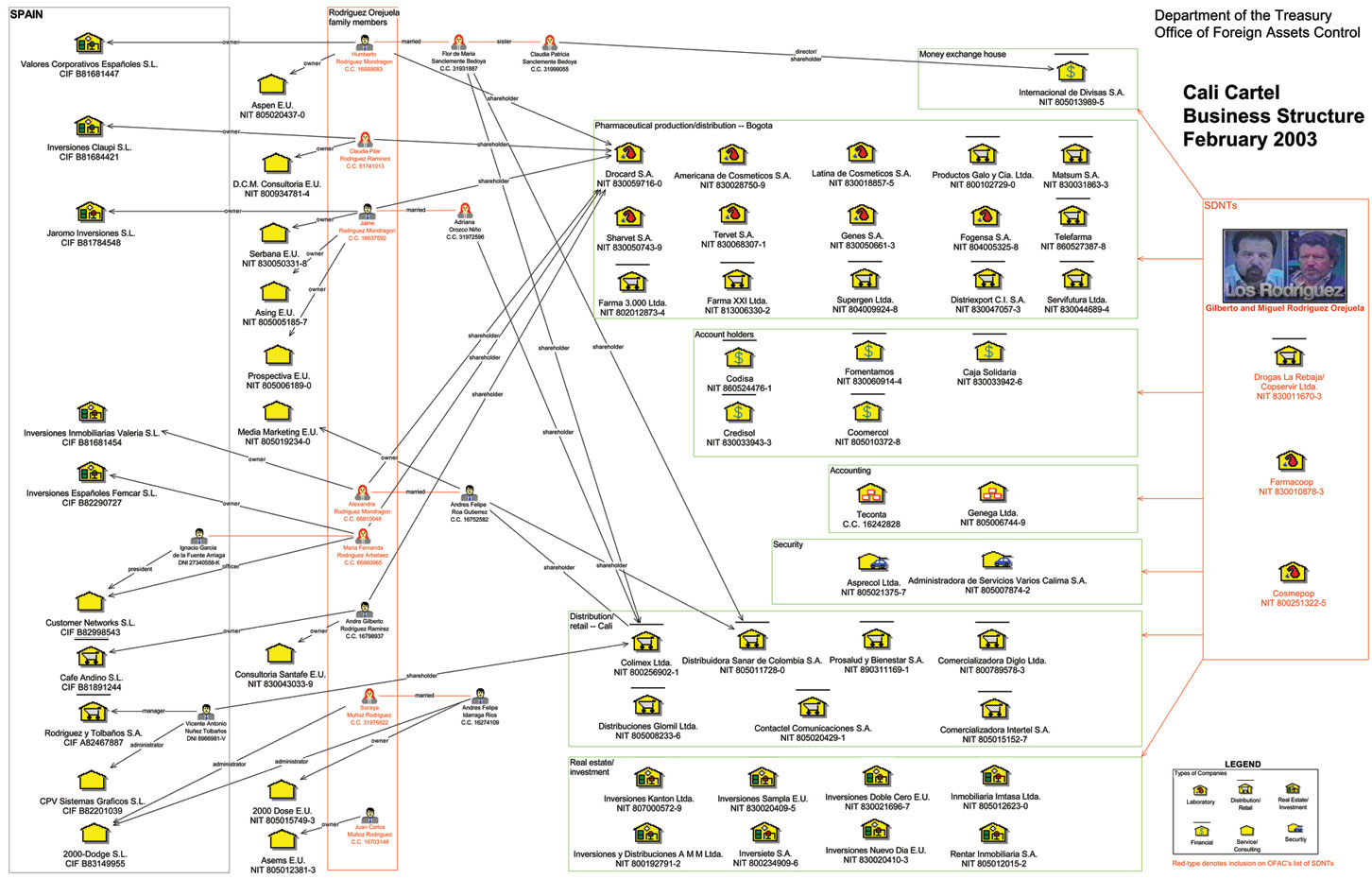
Cali Cartel money laundering chart

In order to launder the incoming money of the trafficking operations, the Cali cartel heavily invested its funds into legitimate business ventures as well as front companies to mask the money. In 1994, it was believed the Cartel was grossing $5 billion in annual revenue from the US alone. With the influx of cash comes the need to launder the funds. One of the first instances of the Cali Cartel's laundering operations came when Gilberto Rodriguez Orejuela was able to secure the position of Chairman of the Board of Banco de Trabajadores. The bank was believed to have been used to launder funds for the Cali cartel, as well as Pablo Escobar's Medellín Cartel. Cartel members were permitted, through their affiliation with Gilberto, to overdraft accounts and take out loans without repayment. Allegedly, Semion Mogilevich instructed Natasha Kagalovsky to wire transfer Cali cartel funds from Bank of New York accounts though Brazilian banks to offshore shell companies.

Capitalizing on this basis, Gilberto was able to found the First InterAmericas Bank operating out of Panama. In an interview with Time, Gilberto admitted to money being laundered through the bank; however, he attributed the process to only legal actions. The laundering, which Gilberto states was "in accordance with Panamanian law", is what led to the US authorities' pursuing him. Gilberto later started, in 1979, the Grupo Radial Colombiano, a network of over 30 radio stations and a pharmaceutical chain named Drogas la Rebaja, which at its height amassed over 400 stores in 28 cities, employing 4,200. The pharmaceutical chain's value was estimated at $216 million. As a consequence of the Cali Cartel's ownership of the chain, from January 1988 to May 4, 1990, it was targeted for 85 bombings by Pablo Escobar and the Medellín Cartel, leaving a total of 27 people dead.

=== Violence ===
==== Discipline ====
Political violence was largely discounted by the Cali Cartel, as the threat of violence often sufficed. The organization of the cartel was structured so that only people who had family in Colombia would handle operations that involved both Cali and U.S. sites, keeping the family within reach of the cartel. Family members became the cartel's insurance that its members would not assist government officials, nor would they refuse payment for products received. The threat of death also hung over those who made mistakes. It is believed the cartel would often kill junior members who made gross errors.

==== Social cleansing ====
In his book End of Millennium, Manuel Castells states the Cali Cartel had participated in social cleansing of hundreds of desechables ("discardables"). The desechables included prostitutes, street children, petty thieves, homosexuals and the homeless.

Along with some of the locals, the Cali Cartel formed parties self-named grupos de limpieza social ("social cleansing groups") who murdered the desechables, often leaving them with signs on them stating: "Cali limpia, Cali linda" ("clean Cali, beautiful Cali"). The bodies of those murdered were often tossed into the Cauca River, which later became known as the "River of Death". The municipality of Marsella in Risaralda was eventually bankrupted by the cost of recovering corpses and conducting autopsies.

==== Retaliation ====
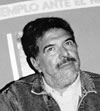
José Santacruz Londoño

In the 1980s and early 1990s, the communist guerrillas struck at the drug cartels. In 1981, the guerrilla group, Movimiento 19 de Abril (M-19; "19th of April Movement"), kidnapped Marta Nieves Ochoa, the sister of the Medellín Cartel's Ochoa brothers, Jorge, Fabio and Juan David. M-19 demanded a ransom of $15 million for Marta's safe release, but were rejected. In response to the kidnapping, the Medellín and Cali cartels, as well as associated traffickers, formed the group Muerte a Secuestradores (MAS; "Death to Kidnappers"). Traffickers contributed funds, rewards, equipment and manpower for MAS operations. Leaflets soon after were dropped in a football pitch in Cali announcing the formation of the group. MAS began to capture and torture M-19 members in retaliation. Within three days, Marta Nieves was released. The group MAS, however, would continue to operate, with hundreds of killings attributed to them.

In 1992, the guerrilla faction Fuerzas Armadas Revolucionarias de Colombia (FARC; "Revolutionary Armed Forces of Colombia") kidnapped Christina Santa Cruz, the daughter of Cali Cartel leader José Santacruz Londoño. FARC demanded in exchange for the safe return of Christina a ransom of $10 million. In response, the Cali Cartel kidnapped 20 or more members of the Colombian Communist Party, Patriotic Union, the United Workers Union, and the sister of Pablo Catatumbo, a representative of the Simón Bolívar Guerrilla Coordinating Board. Eventually, after talks, Christina and the sister of Catatumbo were released. It is unknown what happened to the other hostages taken by the cartel.

During the narco-terror war waged by Pablo Escobar on the Colombian government, it is believed a hired assassin attempted to kill Herrera while he was attending a sports event. The gunman opened fire using a machine gun on the crowd where Herrera was sitting, killing 19. However, he did not hit Herrera. Herrera is believed to have been a founding member of Los Pepes, a group which operated alongside authorities with the intention of killing or capturing Pablo Escobar.

The Cali cartel then hired a member of Colombia's military, a civil engineer named Jorge Salcedo. They wanted him to help them plot an assassination of Pablo Escobar. They hired him because they heard that Salcedo had in the past, befriended and hired a group of mercenaries to wage war against the left-wing guerrilla forces in an operation sanctioned by Colombia's military. The mercenary group was made up of 12 former special operations soldiers, including the British Special Air Service. Salcedo felt it was his patriotic duty and accepted the deal to bring the mercenaries back to Colombia and help plan the operation to kill Pablo Escobar.

The group of British ex-soldiers accepted the offer. The cartel provided food, housing, and weapons to the mercenaries. The plan was to attack Escobar at his Hacienda Nápoles compound. They trained for a few months until they heard Escobar was going to be staying at the compound, celebrating the fact that his football team had won a tournament. They were going to be inserted by use of two heavily armed Hughes 500 helicopters and surprise-attack Escobar during the early morning. They painted the helicopters to look like police helicopters to further confuse them. They took off and headed towards the compound but one of the helicopters ended up crashing onto a mountainside, minutes away from the compound. The pilot was killed during the crash. The plan was aborted and they had to conduct a rescue mission up the dense mountainside.

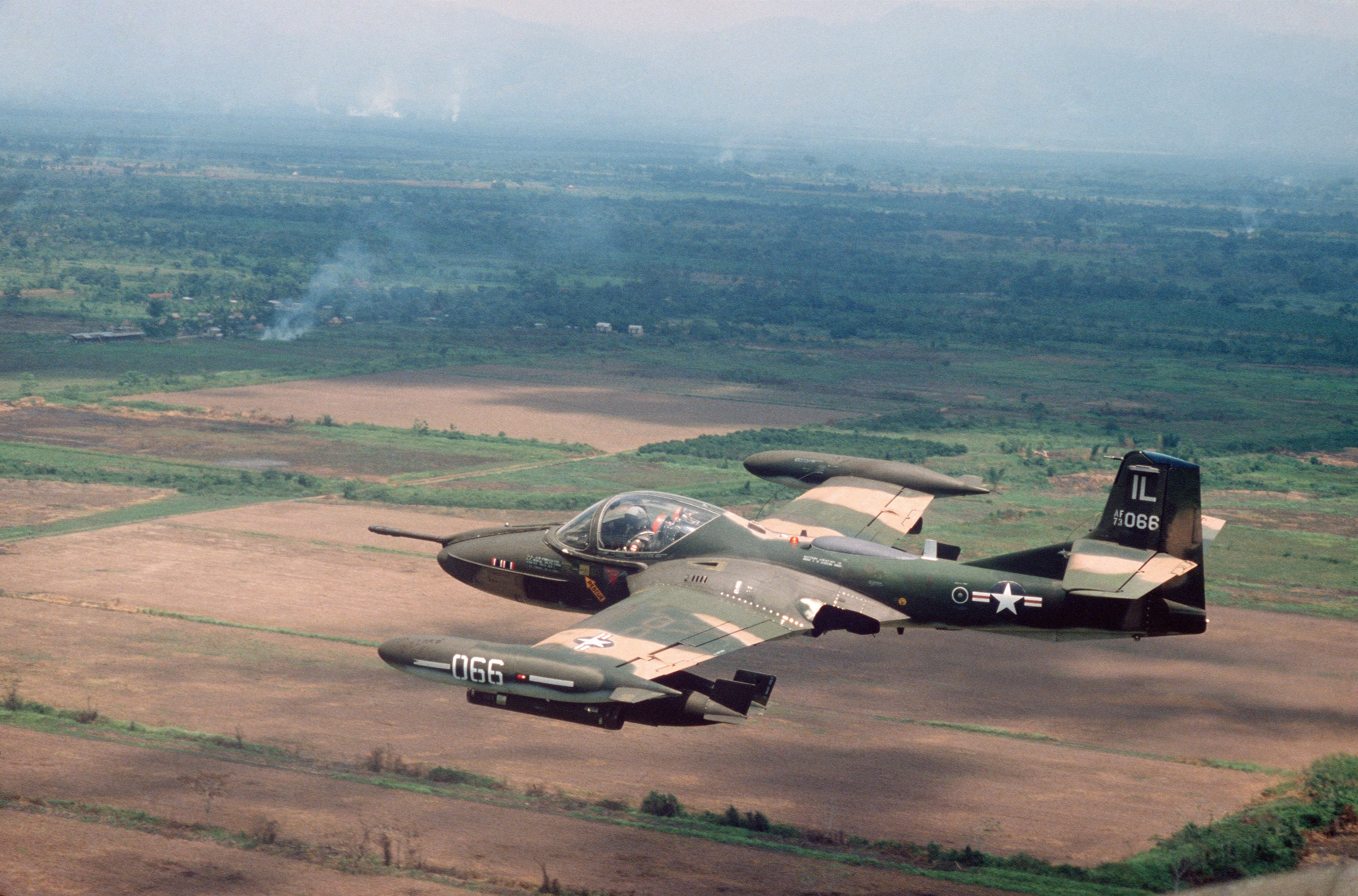
One plan included the use of a privately owned A-37 jet to bomb the prison holding Escobar.

Finally, Escobar went to prison, where he continued to run his Medellin Cartel and menace rivals from his cell. The second plot to kill Escobar was to bomb the prison by using an A-37 Dragonfly surplus ground-attack jet bomber in private ownership. The Cali Cartel had a connection in El Salvador, a general of El Salvador's military who illegally sold them four 500-pound bombs for about half a million dollars.

Salcedo flew over to El Salvador to oversee the plan to pick up the bombs and take them to an airfield where a civilian jet would land to pick them up and take them to Colombia. But when the jet landed at the airfield they found that it was a small executive jet. They attempted to load the four bombs, and what was planned to be a few minutes, it took them over 20 minutes. By this time there was a crowd of civilians that had gathered at the airfield curious about what was happening. Only three bombs fit, stacked in the small passenger cabin. The jet took off and Salcedo abandoned the fourth bomb and went back to his hotel. The morning after, the activities of the night before were all over the news. Salcedo barely escaped El Salvador and arrest before the botched pickup was exposed. Law enforcement had discovered the bomb and some of the people involved in the operation were arrested, and they told authorities about the plot to kill Escobar with the bombs. The Cali Cartel then decided to abort the air bombing plot.

There was no turning back for Salcedo. The Colombian government labeled him a criminal now working for the Cali Cartel, and his employers would not let him go anyway. Salcedo then settled into managing security for the Orejuela family, but then he was forced to witness an execution of four Panamanians, and tasked with organizing the murder of Guillermo Pallomari, their own cartel accountant. Salcedo faced a choice: to kill or risk being killed along with his family. Salcedo then decided to retaliate and save Pallomari and himself by contacting the US Central Intelligence Agency and work as an informant. This proved to be the death blow to the Cali Cartel. For his service, Salcedo and his extended family were relocated to the US and he received rewards of about $1.7 million.

=== Counterintelligence ===
The counter-intelligence TN Education Centre of the Cali Cartel often surprised the DEA and Colombian officials. It was discovered, in a 1995 raid of Cali Cartel offices, that the cartel had been monitoring all phone calls made in and out of Bogotá and Cali, including the U.S. Embassy in Bogotá and the Ministry of Defense. A laptop found allowed Londoño to eavesdrop on phone calls being made as well as analyze phone lines for wiretaps. While officials were able to discover the use of the laptop, it is reported they were unable to decrypt many of the files due to sophisticated encryption techniques. Londoño was also believed to have a person within the phone company itself, which the officials realized when he was able to recognize a phone tap, one that had been placed directly at the phone company, instead of at his residence. Londoño's lawyer soon sent an official notice requesting the legality and requesting the warrant if one was produced.

Included in the list of government officials and officers on the Cali Cartel payroll were a reported 5,000 taxi drivers. The taxi drivers would allow the cartel to know who was arriving in the city and when, as well as where they were staying. By having numerous taxi drivers on the payroll, the cartel was able to monitor the movements of officials and dignitaries. It is reported by Time magazine, in 1991, DEA and U.S. Customs Service (now ICE) agents were monitoring a shipment being offloaded in Miami, only to find out later that the DEA agents were the target of Cali surveillance at the same time.

Jorge Salcedo, a member of Colombia's military, was put in charge of the cartel's intelligence and later provided security to Miguel. He would later, ironically, be crucial in helping destroy the cartel and pinpointing where Miguel was hiding. He designed and set up a large hidden radio network across the city allowing members to communicate wherever they were. They also had many people inside law enforcement working for them, including a high-ranking member of the Bloque de Búsqueda (search block) who were looking for the Cali Cartel's top leaders. When law enforcement had finally cornered Miguel inside an apartment, the double agent was there (along with other law enforcement including two DEA agents) trying to find the secret compartment in which Miguel was hiding. Law enforcement failed to find him on time and were forced to leave the apartment. They maintained a perimeter around the building to prevent his escape. The double agent was crucial in helping Miguel escape, as he hid Miguel in his car and drove away from the scene untroubled.

== Relationship with the Medellín Cartel ==
=== First InterAmericas Bank ===
Jorge Ochoa, a high ranking Medellín financier had been childhood friends and years later co-owned the Panamanian First InterAmericas Bank. The institution was later cited by United States officials as a money laundering operation, which allowed both the Cali Cartel and the Medellín Cartel to move and launder large amounts of funds. Only through diplomatic pressure on Panamanian Dictator Manuel Noriega could the U.S. put an end to the bank's use as a money laundering front. In a Time magazine interview, Gilberto Rodriguez admitted to laundering money through the bank but noted that the process broke no Panamanian laws.

=== Muerte a Secuestradores ===
The two cartels participated in other joint ventures in later years, such as the founding of Muerte a Secuestradores (MAS), who successfully returned Ochoa's kidnapped sister, Marta Nieves Ochoa. Expanding on the prior success of MAS, the cartels and independent traffickers would meet again.

The second meeting is believed to have been the start of an organization trafficking between the primary participants, the Medellín Cartel and Cali Cartel. The two cartels divided up the major United States distribution points: the Cali Cartel took New York City and the Medellín Cartel took South Florida and Miami; Los Angeles was left up for grabs.

Through their affiliation in MAS, it is also believed the cartels decided to work together to stabilize prices, production, and shipments of the cocaine market. However, the strategic alliance formed with the foundation of MAS in 1981 began to crumble by 1983–1984, due to the ease of competition. As the cartels set up infrastructure, routes, transport methods, and bribes, it became easier for competitors to either establish similar deals or make use of those already put in place by other cartels. By 1987, the cooperation forged by the formation of MAS no longer existed. Contributing to the demise was the Medellín Cartel's Rodríguez Gacha, who attempted to move in on the New York City market, previously ceded to the Cali Cartel, and the 1986 arrest of Jorge Ochoa at a police roadblock, which the Medellín Cartel deemed suspicious and attributed partly to the Cali Cartel.

=== Los Pepes ===
In later years, as Pablo Escobar's narco-terror war escalated against the Colombian government, the government began to strike back in ever escalating battles. As the Medellín Cartel weakened due to the fighting and constant pressure, the Cali Cartel grew in strength, eventually founding Los Pepes, or Perseguidos por Pablo Escobar ("People Persecuted by Pablo Escobar"). Los Pepes was specifically formed to target the Medellín Cartel and bring about the downfall of Pablo Escobar.

It is believed Los Pepes provided information to Search Bloc, a joint police and army unit specifically created to track down Medellín leaders. In exchange for information, Los Pepes received assistance from the United States counter-terrorism unit, Delta Force, through its links to Search Bloc. By the time of Escobar's capture and eventual death in December 1993, Los Pepes had been responsible for the deaths or executions of over 60 associates or members of the Medellín Cartel. The death of Pablo Escobar led to the dismantling of the Medellín Cartel and the rise of the Cali Cartel.

== Law enforcement ==
=== Seizures ===
While the Cali Cartel operated with a degree of immunity early on, owing to its ties to the government and the Medellín Cartel's narco-terrorism war on the Colombian government, they were still subjected to drug seizures. In 1991 alone, law enforcement agencies seized 67 tons of cocaine, 75% originating from the Cali Cartel. In total, the US Customs Service (USCS) alone had spent 91,855 case hours and 13 years in investigations against the Cali Cartel, seizing 50 tons of cocaine and $15 million in assets.

In 1991, a shipment of cocaine hidden inside of concrete posts was intercepted with the aid of a drug-sniffing dog at the Miami seaport. It led to the seizure of 12,000 kilograms (26,455 lb) of cocaine and several arrests, beginning what the US Customs Service would dub Operation Cornerstone, which lasted 14 years. In another seizure the following year, a USCS wiretap on Harold Ackerman, whose affiliation was derived from the 1991 seizure, enabled the arrest of seven individuals and 6,000 kilograms (13,228 lb) of cocaine hidden in a load of broccoli. Accounting ledgers were seized in related arrests, which allowed the identification of another shipment being sent to Panama hidden in tiles. This information was passed to Panamanian authorities and led to the seizure of 5,100 kilograms (11,244 lb).

In 1993, the US Customs Service struck again at the Cali cartel, this time seizing 5,600 kilograms (12,346 lb) while pursuing Raul Marti, the only remaining member of the defunct Miami cell. It is believed these successive raids forced the cartel to funnel its shipments through Mexico; however, that did not stop the US Customs Service. Three maritime ships were intercepted in 1993, with a total of 17,000 kilograms (37,479 lb).

=== Major arrests ===
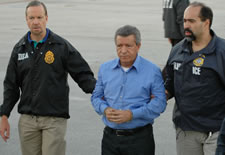
Miguel Rodríguez Orejuela being escorted by DEA and ICE agents

Between June and July 1995, the remaining six of the seven heads of the cartel were arrested. Gilberto was arrested in his home, and Henry Loaiza-Ceballos, Victor Patiño-Fomeque and Phanor Arizabaleta-Arzayus surrendered to authorities. Jose Santa Cruz Londoño was captured in a restaurant, and a month later, Miguel Rodriguez was apprehended during a raid.

The Rodríguez brothers were extradited in 2006 to the United States and pleaded guilty in Miami, Florida, to charges of conspiracy to import cocaine into the United States. Upon their confession, they agreed to forfeit $2.1 billion in assets. The agreement, however, did not require them to cooperate in other investigations. They were solely responsible for identification of assets stemming from their cocaine trafficking. Colombian officials raided and seized the Drogas la Rebaja pharmacy chain, replacing 50 of its 4,200 workers on the grounds that they were "serving the interests of the Cali Cartel".

== See also ==
- Manuel de Dios Unanue
- Norte del Valle Cartel

== Bibliography ==
- Bowden, Mark (2001). Killing Pablo: The Hunt for the World's Greatest Outlaw. New York: Atlantic Monthly Press. ISBN 978-0-802123787.
- Chepesiuk, R. (2005). Drug Lords: The Rise and Fall of the Cali Cartel. Milo Books. ISBN 1-903854-38-5.
- Chepesiuk, R. (2003). The Bullet Or the Bribe: Taking Down Colombia's Cali Drug Cartel. Praeger Publishers. ISBN 0-275-97712-9.
- Rempel, W. (2011). At the Devil's Table: The Untold Story of the Insider Who Brought Down the Cali Cartel. Random House. ISBN 9781846059032.
