= Trujillo, Valle del Cauca =

Coordinates: 4°15′N 76°20′W

Trujillo, Colombia
- Municipality and town
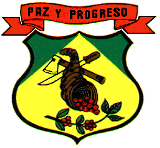
- Flag Coat of arms

- Location of the municipality and town of Trujillo, Valle del Cauca in the Valle del Cauca Department of Colombia.
- Country: Colombia
- Department: Valle del Cauca Department

Area
  - Total: 221 km^{2} (85 sq mi)

Population (2015)
  - Total: 18,142
  - Density: 82.1/km^{2} (213/sq mi)
- Time zone: UTC-5 (Colombia Standard Time)

Trujillo is a town and municipality located in the Department of Valle del Cauca, Colombia.

== Climate ==
Climate data for Trujillo (Manuel M Mallarino), elevation 1,380 m (4,530 ft), (1971–2000)
Month	Jan	Feb	Mar	Apr	May	Jun	Jul	Aug	Sep	Oct	Nov	Dec	Year
Mean daily maximum °C (°F)	26.7 (80.1)	26.5 (79.7)	26.3 (79.3)	26.0 (78.8)	25.2 (77.4)	25.4 (77.7)	26.2 (79.2)	26.4 (79.5)	26.1 (79.0)	25.1 (77.2)	25.1 (77.2)	25.6 (78.1)	25.9 (78.6)
Daily mean °C (°F)	20.9 (69.6)	21.0 (69.8)	21.1 (70.0)	20.8 (69.4)	20.6 (69.1)	20.7 (69.3)	21.0 (69.8)	21.1 (70.0)	20.7 (69.3)	20.0 (68.0)	20.0 (68.0)	20.4 (68.7)	20.7 (69.3)
Mean daily minimum °C (°F)	16.9 (62.4)	16.8 (62.2)	16.9 (62.4)	17.0 (62.6)	16.8 (62.2)	16.7 (62.1)	16.5 (61.7)	16.6 (61.9)	16.5 (61.7)	16.3 (61.3)	16.4 (61.5)	16.5 (61.7)	16.6 (61.9)
Average precipitation mm (inches)	100.4 (3.95)	93.0 (3.66)	131.8 (5.19)	193.7 (7.63)	184.0 (7.24)	125.1 (4.93)	85.5 (3.37)	94.8 (3.73)	137.8 (5.43)	221.2 (8.71)	208.9 (8.22)	137.0 (5.39)	1,713.1 (67.44)
Average precipitation days	11	11	14	18	18	14	11	12	16	21	19	15	179
Average relative humidity (%)	75	74	75	77	79	78	74	74	75	79	80	78	76
Mean monthly sunshine hours	151.9	130.0	136.4	117.0	117.8	135.0	170.5	167.4	138.0	114.7	114.0	136.4	1,629.1
Mean daily sunshine hours	4.9	4.6	4.4	3.9	3.8	4.5	5.5	5.4	4.6	3.7	3.8	4.4	4.5
Source: Instituto de Hidrologia Meteorologia y Estudios Ambientales

== Notable people ==
- Manuel Octavio Bermúdez (1961–2024), serial killer
- Diego León Montoya Sánchez (born 1958/1961), crime boss
- Cristian Pulido (born 1991), footballer
