= List of terrorist incidents =

The following is a list of terrorist incidents that were not carried out by a state or its forces (see state terrorism and state-sponsored terrorism). Assassinations are presented in List of assassinations and unsuccessful attempts at List of people who survived assassination attempts and List of heads of state and government who survived assassination attempts.

Definitions of terrorism vary, so incidents listed here are restricted to those that are notable and described as "terrorism" by a consensus of reliable sources.

Scholars dispute what might be called terrorism in earlier periods. The modern sense of terrorism emerged in the mid-19th century.

== 1800–1899 ==
Date	Type	Dead	Injured	Location	Details	Perpetrator	Part of
1865–1877	Murders	Approx. 3,000	Several	Southern United States	Approximately 3,000 Freedmen and their Republican Party allies are killed in well-organized campaigns of violence by the Ku Klux Klan and other white supremacists in a campaign of terrorist violence that weakened the reconstructionist governments in the Southern United States and helped re-establish legitimized segregation.	Ku Klux Klan	Reconstruction Era
1878–1885	Bombings, arson, shootings	0	5 (4 heavy)	Montceau-les-Mines region, France	Montceau-les-Mines troubles. After the repression of a miner's strike, groups of numerous anarchist and inspired by anarchism miners organized themselves into the Black Band(s) and carried out dozens of acts of propaganda of the deed in the following years, the majority between 1882 and 1885.	Black Band(s) – Black International (?)	propaganda of the deed
16 Jun 1881	Bombing	0	0	Saint-Germain-en-Laye, France	An anarchist 'French Revolutionary Committee' placed bombs in small boxes around the statue of Adolphe Thiers – a significant political figure and responsible for the massacres of the Paris Commune ten years prior. The bombs encountered technical issues. First clear propaganda of the deed attack in France.	French anarchists – Black International (?)	propaganda of the deed
1881–1885	Bombing	0 (+3)	98	United Kingdom	Fenian dynamite campaign.	Irish Republican Brotherhood	
23 Oct 1882	Bombing	1	10+	Lyon, France	Assommoir bombing. First deadly anarchist attack in France.	Fanny Madignier and 2 other anarchists – Black International (?)	propaganda of the deed
5 March 1886	Bombing	0	1	Paris, France	Paris Stock Exchange bombing. A French anarchist entered the Paris Stock Exchange, threw a bomb that didn't explode, and began firing at traders.	Charles Gallo	propaganda of the deed
4 May 1886	Bombing	7 (+4)	160+	Chicago, United States	Haymarket Affair. A peaceful rally in Haymarket, Chicago, Illinois, was disrupted when a bomb was detonated as police were dispersing the public demonstration.	FOTLU	propaganda of the deed or state terrorism
5-6 July 1887	Bombing	0	0	Paris, France	Berthe bombing. The store of a landlord in conflict with anarchists explodes in the middle of the night.	Paolo Chiericotti (?) – Vittorio Pini (?) – Intransigents of London and Paris (?)	propaganda of the deed
1888–1889	Bombing	0	1	Paris, France	Anarchist bombing campaign of 1888–1889 targeting employment agencies at night (in order to avoid civilian casualties)	Placide Schouppe (?) – Intransigents of London and Paris (?)	propaganda of the deed
29 Feb 1892	Bombing	0	0	Paris, France	An anarchist in France bombs an elite residence in the Rue Saint Dominique.	Anarchist in France	Ère des attentats
7 Mar 1892	Bombing	0	1	Paris, France	Saint-Germain bombing. Start of the Ère des attentats.	Ravachol, Cookie, Mariette, Béala	Ère des attentats
15 Mar 1892	Bombing	0	0	Paris, France	Lobau bombing.	Théodule Meunier	Ère des attentats
27 Mar 1892	Bombing	0	7	Paris, France	French anarchist Ravachol bombs the house of prosecutor Bulot, after the trial of the accused of the Clichy Affair.	Ravachol, Cookie, Mariette, Béala	Ère des attentats
25 Apr 1892	Bombing	2	1	Paris, France	French anarchists Meunier, François and Bricout bomb the café Le Very, targeting the owner, who denounced Ravachol to the police. He is killed in the explosion.	Pieds plats	Ère des attentats
8 Nov 1892	Bombing	5	0	Paris, France	French anarchists Émile Henry and Adrienne Chailliey bomb a police station.	Émile Henry, Adrienne Chailliey	Ère des attentats
7 Nov 1893	Bombing	20–30	27–35	Barcelona, Spain	Catalan anarchist Santiago Salvador bombs the Liceu theater. Considered the first instance of 'indiscriminate terrorism'. Founding event for modern terrorism.	Santiago Salvador	propaganda of the deed
13 Nov 1893	Stabbing	0	1	Paris, France	French anarchist Léon Léauthier stabs one Rista Georgevitch simply because he 'looked bourgeois'. Considered one of the first instances of 'indiscriminate terrorism'. Founding event for modern terrorism.	Léon Léauthier	Ère des attentats
9 Dec 1893	Bombing	0	20	Paris, France	National Assembly bombing. 0 deaths and dozens of lightly injured people.	Auguste Vaillant	Ère des attentats
12 Feb 1894	Bombing	1	17	Paris, France	French anarchist Émile Henry bombs Café Terminus. Considered one of the first instances of 'indiscriminate terrorism'.	Émile Henry	Ère des attentats
20 Feb 1894	Bombings	1	1	Paris, France	Belgian anarchist Pauwels attacks the authorities in the 20 February bombings.	Désiré Pauwels	Ère des attentats
15 Mar 1894	Bombing	1	0	Paris, France	Belgian anarchist Pauwels attacks the Madeleine church in the Madeleine bombing. He dies during the attempt.	Désiré Pauwels	Ère des attentats
4 Apr 1894	Bombing	0	4+	Paris, France	Either the French or the Russian states commit a provocation by bombing a restaurant in Paris, trying to capitalize on the troubles of the Ère des attentats.	French state or Okhrana	Ère des attentats
19 May 1894	Stabbing	0	1	Marseille, France	1894 Marseille stabbing by French anarchist Célestin Nat to avenge Henry.	Célestin Nat	Ère des attentats
26 Aug 1896	Hijacking	10+	0	Constantinople, Ottoman Empire	Occupation of the Ottoman Bank by Armenian Revolutionary Federation members in protest of the Hamidian massacres. A resulting anti-Armenian pogrom killed around 6,000 individuals.	Armenian Revolutionary Federation	

== 1900–1929 ==
Date	Type	Dead	Injured	Location	Details	Perpetrator	Part of
28 April – 1 May 1903	Bombings	0 (+4)		Thessaloniki, Ottoman Empire	Members of the Boatmen of Thessaloniki, a Bulgarian anarchist group, carried out a series of bombings in Thessaloniki.	Boatmen of Thessaloniki	
18 May 1904	Kidnapping	0	2 kidnapped	Tangier, Morocco	Perdicaris affair: Ion Perdicaris and Cromwell Varley were kidnapped and held for ransom by bandit Mulai Ahmed er Raisuli in Morocco.	Mulai Ahmed er Raisuli	
1 February 1905	Bombing	0	2	Paris, France	A bomb is sent towards the Republican Guard during an anti-Tsarist leftist protest. Jean-Pierre François, who was near the explosion, was arrested, but was freed for failure to provide proofs.	Jean-Pierre François (?) (Freed and not convicted)	
31 May 1905	Bombing	0	21	Paris, France	Rohan bombing. 24 people injured when a Catalan anarchist (?) bombed Alfonso XIII of Spain.	Aviño/Alexandre Farras (?)	
21 July 1905	Bombing	21	58	Constantinople, Ottoman Empire	Abdul Hamid II assassination attempt in Yıldız. A group composed of Armenian revolutionaries (Sophie Areshian, Martiros Margarian) and anarchists (Edward Joris, Anna Nellens) tries to bomb sultan Abdul Hamid II.	Armenian Revolutionary Federation (ARF) / Anarchists	
31 May 1906	Bombing	24	Several	Madrid, Spain	Morral affair. 24 people were killed when terrorist bombed the Royal Couple, Alfonso XIII of Spain and Victoria Eugenie, on their wedding day.	Mateo del Morral	
25 August 1906	Bombing	28	Several	(Russian Empire) Aptekarsky Island, Russia	28 people were killed when three terrorists bombed a reception in an attempt to assassinate Pyotr Stolypin.	Union of Socialists-Revolutionaries-Maximalists	
11–12 July 1908	Bombing	1	23	Malmö, Sweden	Night between 11 and 12 July: Bombing of the boat Amalthea where British strikebreakers lived by Anton Nilsson One was killed and 23 wounded.	Anton Nilsson	
1 October 1910	Bombing	21	105+	Los Angeles, United States	Los Angeles Times bombing killed 21 people and wounded over 100 others.	John J. McNamara and James B. McNamara	
28 June 1914	Various	2	16–22	Sarajevo, Austria-Hungary	The Assassination of Archduke Franz Ferdinand, heir presumptive to the Austrian throne, and his wife, Sophie, Duchess of Hohenberg. As the Archduke's car approached the third assassin after the others failed to act, the bomb bounced off the Archduke's car and exploded the car behind him, injuring 16–20 people. Later, as the Archduke's car turned a wrong corner, assassin Gavrilo Princip shot dead the Archduke and his wife in their car. This resulted in the July Crisis, and World War I.	Gavrilo Princip (with the Black Hand)	Prelude to World War I
22 July 1916	Bombing	10	40	San Francisco, United States	Preparedness Day Bombing was a bombing in San Francisco, California, on 22 July 1916, when the city held a parade in anticipation of the United States' entry into World War I. During the parade, a suitcase bomb was detonated, killing ten and wounding forty.	Galleanist Anarchists (suspected)	
30 July 1916	Bombing	7	Hundreds	Jersey City, United States	Black Tom explosion was a planned detonation of a munitions factory at Black Tom Island in the neutral United States by Imperial German Agents that killed four and injured hundreds, as well as causing millions of dollars in damages.	Imperial German Agents	World War I
16 September 1920	Bombing	40	143+	New York City, United States	Wall Street bombing killed 40 people and wounded over 143 others.	Galleanist Anarchists (suspected)	Red Scare
14 October 1920	Bombings	1	10	Trieste, Italy	In Trieste, nationalists threw six bombs at the editorial office of a socialist newspaper, resulting in one death and ten injuries.	Italian Nationalists	
15 October 1920	Bombings	0	2	Milan, Italy	In Milan, anarchists were responsible for throwing two bombs at a hotel holding a British delegation attending the Milan International Conference; there were two injuries.	Anarchists	
8 December 1920	Bombing	3	3	Bucharest, Romania	A bomb placed by a left-wing terrorist group blows up in the Romanian Senate, killing the Minister of Justice and two other senators. The President of the Senate and two Orthodox bishops were severely injured.	Max Goldstein, Leon Lichtblau and Saul Ozias	
31 May 1921	Riot	39–300	800+	Tulsa, United States	The Tulsa race massacre killed at least 39 people and injured over 800.	Ku Klux Klan	
13 December 1921	Bombing	100		Bolgrad, Romania	The Bolgrad palace bombing occurred when a bomb thrown by Bessarabian separatists at the Bolgrad palace, killed 100 soldiers and police officers.	Bessarabian separatists	Union of Bessarabia with Romania
16 April 1925	Bombing	150	~500	Sofia, Bulgaria	St Nedelya Church assault – The Bulgarian Communist Party (BCP) blew up the church's roof during the funeral service of General Konstantin Georgiev, who had been killed in a previous Communist assault on 14 April. 150 people, mainly from the country's political and military elite, were killed in the attack and around 500 were injured.	Bulgarian Communist Party	

== 1930–1949 ==
Date	Type	Dead	Injured	Location	Details	Perpetrator	Part of
9 October 1934	Assassination by shooting	2 (+1)		Marseille, France	During a state visit to France, King Alexander I of Yugoslavia was fatally shot by the Bulgarian IMRO assassin Vlado Chernozemski. In the ensuing scuffle with local police, French Foreign Minister Louis Barthou was accidentally killed by a stray bullet, while Chernozemski was beaten and later died from his injuries.	Vlado Chernozemski (on behalf of IMRO)	
3 March 1940	Arson	5	5	Luleå, Sweden	Politically motivated arson attack targeted at the communist newspaper Norrskensflamman (Northern Flame) by various perpetrators. 5 people were killed, 2 of which were children, along with 5 others injured.	Norrbottens-Kuriren	
4 July 1940	Bombing	2	0	New York City, United States	Time bomb is recovered from the British Pavilion at the 1939 New York World's Fair, two NYPD policemen were killed.	Unknown	
1940–1956	Serial bombings	0	15	New York City, United States	George Metesky, the "Mad Bomber", places over 30 bombs in New York City in public places such as Grand Central Terminal and The Paramount Theater, injuring ten during this period, in protest against the local electric utility. He also sends many threatening letters.	George Metesky	
22 July 1946	Bombing	91	46	Jerusalem, Mandatory Palestine	The King David Hotel bombing by Zionist paramilitary group Irgun kills 91 and injures 46 non-fatally.	Irgun	Jewish insurgency in Mandatory Palestine
25 July 1947	Airliner hijacking	1	0	Romania	Three Romanian terrorists kill an aircrew member aboard a Romanian airliner. This is regarded as the first aircraft hijack resulting in a fatality.	Unknown	
22 February 1948	Car bombings	58	123	Jerusalem, Mandatory Palestine	Ben Yehuda Street bombings: three British Army trucks led by an armoured car driven by Arab irregulars and British deserters exploded on Ben Yehuda Street killing 58 Jewish civilians and injuring 140.	Arab insurgents and rogue British soldiers	1947–1948 civil war in Mandatory Palestine
7 May 1949	Airliner bombing	13	0	Philippines	Thirteen people are killed as a Philippine airliner explodes in flight travelling from Daet to Manila. A time bomb detonates 30 minutes after departure near Alabat Island.	Unknown	
5 August 1949	Grenade attack	12	~30	Damascus, Syria	12 killed and dozens injured in the Menarsha synagogue attack.	Arab Redemption Suicide Phalange	1948 Palestine war

== 1950–1969 ==
Date	Type	Dead	Injured	Location	Details	Perpetrator	Part of
17 March 1954	Shooting	12	2	Scorpions Pass, Israel	Ma'ale Akrabim massacre: an Israeli civilian passenger bus is attacked by unknown assailants at the Scorpions Pass in the Negev, resulting in the deaths of eleven passengers.	Palestinian fedayeen	Palestinian Fedayeen insurgency
16 June 1955	Bombing	308	~1200	Buenos Aires, Argentina	Bombing of Plaza de Mayo: Thirty aircraft from the Argentine Navy and Air Force bombed and strafed Plaza de Mayo. The attack targeted the adjacent Casa Rosada, the seat of government of former president Juan Perón.	Anti-Peronist elements of the Argentine Armed Forces	1955 Argentine coup d'état
16 June 1956	Bombing	1	6	Nicosia, British Cyprus	The United States vice consul is killed and six other consulate staff are injured when a terrorist throws 2 bombs in a restaurant in Nicosia.	Unknown	Cyprus Emergency
15 August 1958	Bombing	3	10	Beirut, Lebanon	Three people are killed in a bomb blast in Beirut. The bombing also injures ten more at a grocery store near the Lebanese Parliament.	Unknown	1958 Lebanon crisis
22 November 1962	Riot	2 (+5)	?	Paarl, South Africa	Members of the Pan Africanist Congress' military wing, the Azanian People's Liberation Army (also known as Poqo) targeted the town of Paarl in the Western Cape, when a crowd of over 200 people armed with axes, pangas and other home-made weapons marched from the Mbekweni township into Paarl and attacked the police station, homes and shops. Two white residents and 5 attackers were killed. Poqo directed its activities at the white population in general. It was also Poqo's avowed policy to attack and kill black people who were some way or another linked to the apartheid state.	PAC (APLA)	Internal resistance to apartheid
29 August 1963	Bank robbery	2	3	Buenos Aires, Argentina	The Tacuara Nationalist Movement robbed a bank, stealing almost 100,000 US dollars. 2 people died and 3 were injured.	Tacuara Nationalist Movement	
15 September 1963	Bombing	4	22	Birmingham, United States	16th Street Baptist Church bombing – Four members of the Ku Klux Klan planted at least 15 sticks of dynamite attached to a timing device beneath the front steps of the church. The explosion killed 4 girls and wounded 22.	Ku Klux Klan	Civil rights movement
1963–1970	Bombing	8	?	Quebec, Canada	Front de libération du Québec (FLQ) committed frequent bombings targeting English businesses and banks, as well as McGill University. The whole bombing campaign resulted in 8 known deaths and numerous injuries.	Front de libération du Québec	Quebec sovereignty movement
26 June 1965	Bombings	42	80	Saigon, South Vietnam	Two simultaneous explosions took place near a restaurant in the 1965 Saigon bombing during the Vietnam War. The attack killed 42 people and 80 were wounded.	Viet Cong	Vietnam War
1966	Riots and massacres	8,000 to 30,000	?	Northern Region, Nigeria	The 1966 anti-Igbo pogrom was a series of massacres committed against Igbos and other people of southern Nigerian origin living in northern Nigeria starting in May 1966 and reaching a peak after 29 September 1966. Between 8,000 and 30,000 Igbos and easterners have been estimated to have been killed. A further 1 million Igbos fled the Northern Region into the East. These events led to the secession of the eastern Nigerian region and the declaration of the Republic of Biafra, which ultimately led to the Nigeria-Biafra war.	Racist mobs	1966 Nigerian coup d'état
28–29 September 1966	Airliner hijacking	0	0	Argentina and Falkland Islands	Aerolíneas Argentinas Flight 648 hijacking: a group of militant Argentine nationalists hijacked a civilian Aerolineas Argentinas aircraft while flying over Puerto Santa Cruz and forced the captain at gunpoint to land in the Falkland Islands, where they took several civilians hostage. The crisis was resolved 36 hours later when the hijackers agreed to release their hostages and return to Argentina for trial.	Argentine nationalist militants	Falkland Islands sovereignty dispute
12 October 1967	Airliner bombing	66	0	Greece	A bomb explodes on board Cyprus Airways Flight 284 near Rhodes killing all 66 people on the aircraft.	Unknown	
4 September 1968	Bombings	1	51	Tel Aviv, Israel	Three bombs are detonated in Tel Aviv, killing one person and injuring 51 people.	Palestine Liberation Organization	Israeli–Palestinian conflict
21–25 February 1969	Bombings	2	20	Jerusalem, Israel	1969 Jerusalem bombings: Three separate bombings in Jerusalem, one in a supermarket and two in the British Consulate. In the supermarket bombing two Israelis were killed, and in all attacks 20 were injured. One of the bombers involved was Rasmea Odeh.	PLO (PFLP)	Israeli–Palestinian conflict
5 August 1969	Bombing	0	0	(Republic of Ireland) Dublin, Ireland	A bomb was detonated in Dublin at the main studio of the state broadcaster, RTÉ. The Ulster Volunteer Force was responsible. No one was injured.	Ulster Volunteer Force	The Troubles
19 October 1969	Attempted bombing	0 (+1)	0	(Republic of Ireland) Ballyshannon, Ireland	A UPV bomber attacked a power station in Ballyshannon, County Donegal. The bomb exploded prematurely as it was being planted, resulting in no casualties other than the attacker. The UVF issued a statement saying the attempted attack was a protest against the Irish Army units "still massed on the border in County Donegal". The statement added: "so long as the threats from Éire continue, so long will the volunteers of Ulster's people's army strike at targets in Southern Ireland".	Ulster Protestant Volunteers	The Troubles
31 October 1969	Bombing	0	0	(Republic of Ireland) Dublin, Ireland	The Ulster Volunteer Force bombed a monument in Bodenstown, Dublin, dedicated to the Irish Republican hero Wolfe Tone. There were no injuries.	Ulster Volunteer Force	The Troubles
11 December 1969	Airliner hijacking, state terrorism	0	0	Sǒndǒk Airfield, North Korea	A Korean Air flight flying from Gangneung to Seoul was hijacked by a North Korean agent and flown to North Korea, of the 46 passengers on board (excluding the agent), 39 were repatriated to South Korea, while the fate of the remaining 7 passengers and 4 crew are unknown.	North Korea	North Korean abductions of South Koreans
12 December 1969	Bombings	17	104	Milan and Rome, Italy	Piazza Fontana bombing in Milan kills at least 17 people and injures at least 88. Three additional blasts occur in Rome, injuring 16 people.	Ordine Nuovo	Years of Lead
26 December 1969	Bombing	0	0	(Republic of Ireland) Dublin, Ireland	The Ulster Volunteer Force bombed the O'Connell Monument in Dublin. There were no injuries but buildings were damaged in a half mile radius.	Ulster Volunteer Force	The Troubles
28 December 1969	Bombing	0	0	(Republic of Ireland) Dublin, Ireland	The Ulster Volunteer Force detonated a bomb outside the Garda central detective bureau in Dublin. The nearby telephone exchange headquarters is suspected to have been the target.	Ulster Volunteer Force	The Troubles

== 1970–present ==
Number of terrorist incidents worldwide

- List of terrorist incidents in 1970
- List of terrorist incidents in 1971
- List of terrorist incidents in 1972
- List of terrorist incidents in 1973
- List of terrorist incidents in 1974
- List of terrorist incidents in 1975
- List of terrorist incidents in 1976
- List of terrorist incidents in 1977
- List of terrorist incidents in 1978
- List of terrorist incidents in 1979
- List of terrorist incidents in 1980
- List of terrorist incidents in 1981
- List of terrorist incidents in 1982
- List of terrorist incidents in 1983
- List of terrorist incidents in 1984
- List of terrorist incidents in 1985
- List of terrorist incidents in 1986
- List of terrorist incidents in 1987
- List of terrorist incidents in 1988
- List of terrorist incidents in 1989
- List of terrorist incidents in 1990
- List of terrorist incidents in 1991
- List of terrorist incidents in 1992
- List of terrorist incidents in 1993
- List of terrorist incidents in 1994
- List of terrorist incidents in 1995
- List of terrorist incidents in 1996
- List of terrorist incidents in 1997
- List of terrorist incidents in 1998
- List of terrorist incidents in 1999
- List of terrorist incidents in 2000
- List of terrorist incidents in 2001
- List of terrorist incidents in 2002
- List of terrorist incidents in 2003
- List of terrorist incidents in 2004
- List of terrorist incidents in 2005
- List of terrorist incidents in 2006
- List of terrorist incidents in 2007
- List of terrorist incidents in 2008
- List of terrorist incidents in 2009
- List of terrorist incidents in 2010
- List of terrorist incidents in 2011
- List of terrorist incidents in 2012
- List of terrorist incidents in 2013
- List of terrorist incidents in 2014
- List of terrorist incidents in 2015
- List of terrorist incidents in 2016
- List of terrorist incidents in 2017
- List of terrorist incidents in 2018
- List of terrorist incidents in 2019
- List of terrorist incidents in 2020
- List of terrorist incidents in 2021
- List of terrorist incidents in 2022
- List of terrorist incidents in 2023
- List of terrorist incidents in 2024
- List of terrorist incidents in 2025
- List of terrorist incidents in 2026

== By country ==
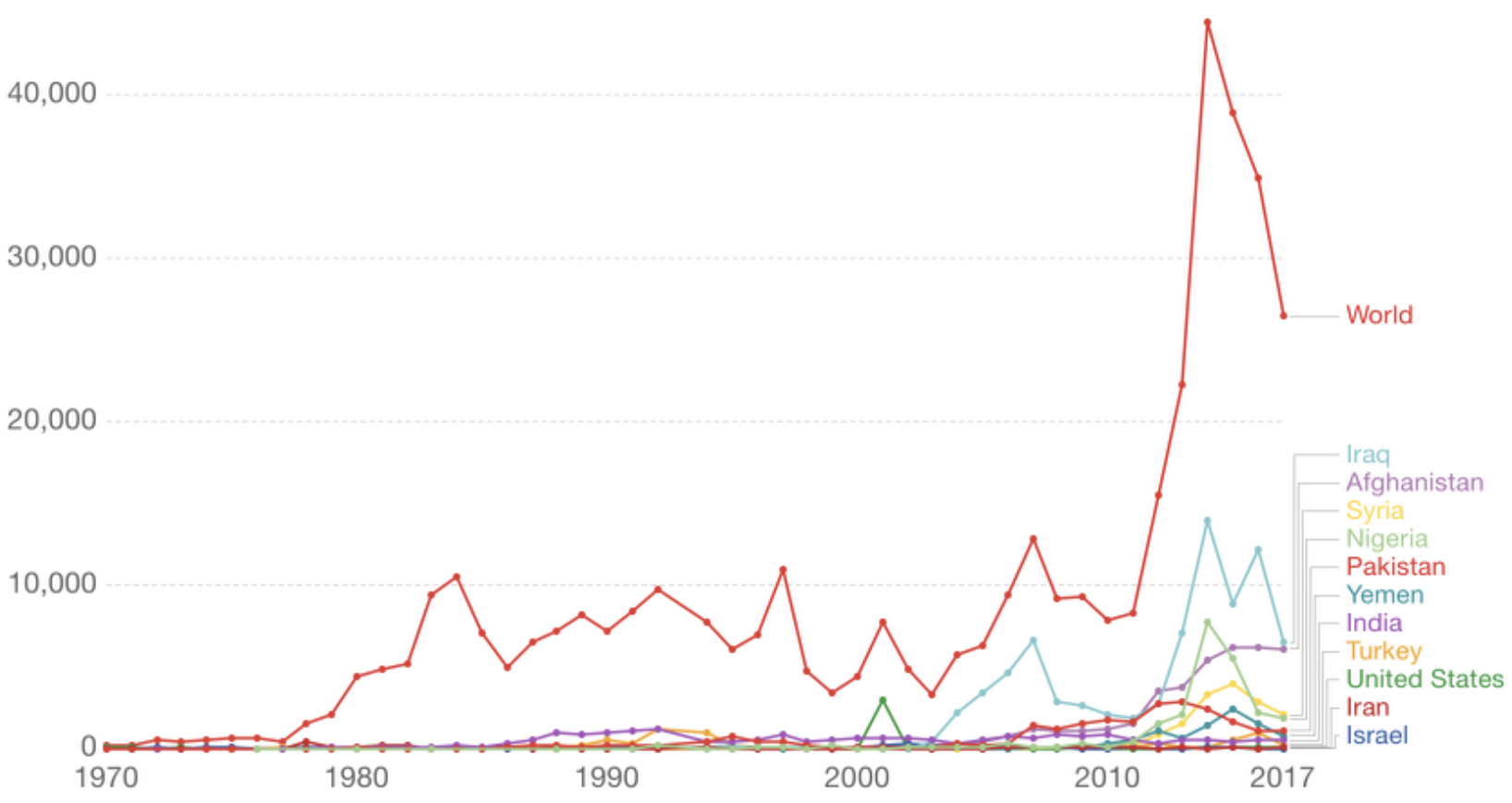
Terrorism deaths per year by country

- List of terrorist incidents in Australia
- Terrorism in Austria
- List of terrorist incidents in Denmark
- List of terrorist incidents in France
- List of terrorist incidents in Great Britain
- List of terrorist incidents in India
- List of terrorist incidents in Indonesia
- List of terrorist incidents in Iraq
- List of terrorist incidents in the Netherlands
- List of terrorist incidents in North Macedonia
- List of terrorist incidents in Pakistan
- List of terrorist incidents in the Philippines
- List of terrorist incidents in Saudi Arabia
- List of non-state terrorist incidents in Sri Lanka
- List of terrorist incidents in Syria
- List of terrorist incidents in Tunisia
- Terrorism in Argentina
- Terrorism in Australia
- Terrorism in Azerbaijan
- Terrorism in Brazil
- Terrorist activity in Belgium
- Terrorism in Bangladesh
- Terrorism in Burkina Faso
- Terrorism in Colombia
- Terrorism in Canada
- Terrorism in China
- Terrorism in Chile
- Terrorism in Denmark
- Terrorism in Egypt
- Terrorism in Ecuador
- Terrorism in France
- Terrorism in Germany
- Terrorism in Greece
- Terrorism in India
- Terrorism in Indonesia
- Assassination and terrorism in Iran
- Terrorism in Iraq
- List of terrorist incidents in Israel
- Terrorism in Italy
- Terrorism in Jamaica
- Terrorism in Kenya
- Terrorism in Kuwait
- Terrorism and counterterrorism in Kazakhstan
- Terrorism in Kyrgyzstan
- Terrorism in Lebanon
- Terrorism in Malaysia
- Terrorism in Morocco
- Terrorism in Myanmar
- Terrorism in Mexico
- Terrorism in Norway
- Terrorism in New Zealand
- Terrorism in Pakistan
- Terrorism in the Philippines
- Terrorism in Poland
- Terrorism in Russia
- Terrorism in Syria
- Terrorism in South Africa
- Terrorism in Somalia
- Terrorism in Sudan
- Terrorism in Serbia
- Terrorism in Sri Lanka
- Terrorism in Saudi Arabia
- Terrorism in Spain
- Terrorism in Sweden
- Terrorism in Switzerland
- Terrorism in Turkey
- Terrorism in Tajikistan
- Terrorism in Uzbekistan
- Terrorism in Ukraine
- Terrorism in Uganda
- Terrorism in the United Arab Emirates
- Terrorism in the United Kingdom
- Terrorism in the United States
- Terrorism in Yemen

== See also ==
- State terrorism
- Domestic terrorism
- Communist terrorism
- Cyberterrorism
- Economic terrorism
- Environmental terrorism
- Left-wing terrorism
- Misogynist terrorism
- Narcoterrorism
- Nuclear terrorism
- Right-wing terrorism
- Religious terrorism
  - Buddhist terrorism
  - Christian terrorism
  - Hindu terrorism
  - Islamic terrorism
  - Jewish terrorism
  - Sikh terrorism (Khalistan movement)
- Number of terrorist incidents by country
- List of major terrorist incidents
- List of aircraft hijackings
- List of assassinations
- List of bus attacks
- List of designated terrorist groups
- List of hostage crises
- List of mass car bombings
- Lists of nuclear disasters and radioactive incidents
- List of marauding terrorist incidents
- List of non-international armed conflicts (civil wars)
- List of ongoing armed conflicts

== Bibliography ==
- Bouhey, Vivien (2008), Les Anarchistes contre la République [The Anarchists against the Republic] (in French), Rennes: Presses universitaires de Rennes (PUR), ISBN 9782753507272
