= List of terrorist incidents in 1988 =

This is a timeline of incidents in 1988 that have been labelled as "terrorism" and are not believed to have been carried out by a government or its forces (see state terrorism and state-sponsored terrorism).

== Guidelines ==
- To be included, entries must be notable (have a stand-alone article) and described by a consensus of reliable sources as "terrorism".
- List entries must comply with the guidelines outlined in the manual of style under MOS:TERRORIST.
- Casualty figures in this list are the total casualties of the incident including immediate casualties and later casualties (such as people who succumbed to their wounds long after the attacks occurred).
- Casualties listed are the victims. Perpetrator casualties are listed separately (e.g. x (+y) indicate that x victims and y perpetrators were killed/injured).
- Casualty totals may be underestimated or unavailable due to a lack of information. A figure with a plus (+) sign indicates that at least that many people have died (e.g. 10+ indicates that at least 10 people have died) – the actual toll could be considerably higher. A figure with a plus (+) sign may also indicate that over that number of people are victims.
- If casualty figures are 20 or more, they will be shown in **bold**. In addition, figures for casualties more than 50 will also be **underlined**.
- Incidents are limited to one per location per day. If multiple attacks occur in the same place on the same day, they will be merged into a single incident.
- In addition to the guidelines above, the table also includes the following categories:

0 people were killed/injured by the incident.
1–19 people were killed/injured by the incident.
20–49 people were killed/injured by the incident.
50–99 people were killed/injured by the incident.
100+ people were killed/injured by the incident.

== List ==
Date	Type	Dead	Injured	Location	Article	Details	Perpetrator	Part of
February 17	Car bombing	27	70	Oshakati, South-West Africa	1988 Oshakati bomb blast	Car bombing of the Barclays bank. SWAPO, the main Namibian liberation organization, and the South African police were both blamed by each other.	SWAPO or South African police	South African Border War
March 7	Shooting, hijacking	3 (+3 terrorists)	8	Aroer, Israel		Three PLO members hijack a civilian bus carrying passengers to the Negev Nuclear Research Center.	PLO	Israeli–Palestinian conflict
March 16	Massacre	3	68	Belfast, Northern Ireland	Milltown Cemetery attack	Michael Stone kills three mourners in a gun and grenade attack on a Provisional Irish Republican Army (IRA) funeral.	Michael Stone (UDA)	The Troubles
March 19	Shooting, stabbing, beating	2	0	Belfast, Northern Ireland	Corporals killings	Two British soldiers, David Howes and Derek Wood, are stabbed, beaten, then shot by the IRA at a funeral procession for an IRA member. The attackers believed the soldiers were Ulster loyalists intent on a repeat of the Milltown Cemetery attack which occurred three days prior.	IRA	The Troubles
April 22 – May 5	Hostage-taking	2 (+19 terrorists)		Ouvéa, New Caledonia		Members of the FLNKS take dozens of gendarmes hostage and demand the independence of New Caledonia from France.	FLNKS	New Caledonia independence movement
May 9	Bombing	0	2	Cannes, France		Bombing of a hostel for immigrant workers	PNFE	
June 15	Car bombing	6	11	Lisburn, Northern Ireland	1988 Lisburn van bombing	The IRA bombs an unmarked van carrying British soldiers, killing six soldiers and injuring eleven other people.	IRA	The Troubles
July 11	Shooting, Bombing	8 (+3 terrorists)	98	Phalerum port, Athens, Greece	City of Poros ship attack	A Libyan born Palestinian gunman from the Abu Nidal Organisation attacked the City of Poros ship, killing seven European tourists and one Greek, before killed by an explosion caused possibly by himself. Four hours earlier two other Arab terrorists were killed when their car laden with explosives exploded prematurely on the pier.	Abu Nidal Organisation	Israeli–Palestinian conflict
August 20	Bombing	8	28	Ballygawley, County Tyrone, Northern Ireland	Ballygawley bus bombing	The IRA bombed a bus carrying British soldiers, killing eight and injuring 28.	IRA	The Troubles
August 23	Shooting, Clash	26 (+25 attackers)	6+	Tierralta, Colombia		The Toma de Saiza was an attack perpetrated by the Simón Bolívar Guerrilla Coordinator, FARC and EPL forces, against a platoon of the Voltigeros Battalion and the police headquarters of the Saiza district.	CGSB, FARC, and EPL	Colombian Conflict
November 15	Shooting	7	15	Pretoria, South Africa		Barend Strydom, a Christian Afrikaner, shot and killed seven people, and wounded 15 more, in and around Strijdom Square. He declared that he was the leader of the White Wolves organisation, which proved to be a figment of his imagination.	Barend Strydom, (Lone wolf)	Terrorism in South Africa
December 1–2	Hijacking	0	0	Ordzhonikidze, USSR		Four armed men seized a bus with 30 schoolchildren and a teacher. Hijackers demanded USD 3 million and a plane to leave the Soviet Union. Their demands were satisfied, but after landing in Israel they were arrested and extradited back to USSR. There were no fatalities.	Pavel Yakshiyants; Vladimir Muravlev; German Vishnyakov; Vladimir Anastasov	
December 19	Bombings	1	12	Cagnes-sur-Mer, France		2 firebombs exploded at a hostel for immigrant workers near Nice. 18 members of the far-right group French and European Nationalist Party were arrested for the bombings.	PNFE	
December 21	Bombing	270	5	Lockerbie, Scotland	Pan Am Flight 103	Pan Am Flight 103 explodes over Lockerbie, Scotland. Two Libyan men were blamed, though only one, Abdelbaset al-Megrahi, was tried and convicted. Some sources have claimed that Libyan leader Muammar Gaddafi personally ordered the attack.	Libya (suspected), Islamic Jihad Organization (suspected)	

== See also ==
- List of terrorist incidents
