= List of terrorist incidents in 1979 =

This is a timeline of incidents in 1979 that have been labelled as "terrorism" and are not believed to have been carried out by a government or its forces (see state terrorism and state-sponsored terrorism).

== Guidelines ==
- To be included, entries must be notable (have a stand-alone article) and described by a consensus of reliable sources as "terrorism".
- List entries must comply with the guidelines outlined in the manual of style under MOS:TERRORIST.
- Casualties figures in this list are the total casualties of the incident including immediate casualties and later casualties (such as people who succumbed to their wounds long after the attacks occurred).
- Casualties listed are the victims. Perpetrator casualties are listed separately (e.g. x (+y) indicate that x victims and y perpetrators were killed/injured).
- Casualty totals may be underestimated or unavailable due to a lack of information. A figure with a plus (+) sign indicates that at least that many people have died (e.g. 10+ indicates that at least 10 people have died) – the actual toll could be considerably higher. A figure with a plus (+) sign may also indicate that over that number of people are victims.
- If casualty figures are 20 or more, they will be shown in **bold**. In addition, figures for casualties more than 50 will also be **underlined**.
- Incidents are limited to one per location per day. If multiple attacks occur in the same place on the same day, they will be merged into a single incident.
- In addition to the guidelines above, the table also includes the following categories:

0 people were killed/injured by the incident.
1–19 people were killed/injured by the incident.
20–49 people were killed/injured by the incident.
50–99 people were killed/injured by the incident.
100+ people were killed/injured by the incident.

== List ==
Date	Type	Dead	Injured	Location	Details	Perpetrator	Part of
February 12	Aircraft shootdown	59	0	Vuti African Purchase Area, Rhodesia	ZIPRA guerillas shot down Air Rhodesia Flight 827, a civilian flight from Kariba to Salisbury using a Strela 2 missile.	ZIPRA	Rhodesian Bush War
March 30	Assassination, bombing	1	0	London, England	Abingdon MP Airey Neave is killed by a bomb in his car planted by the Irish National Liberation Army	INLA	The Troubles
April 22	Massacre	4 (+2)	0	Nahariya, Israel	Nahariya massacre: Four Palestinian Liberation Front militants kill four Israeli civilians, including two children.	Palestinian Liberation Front	Israeli–Palestinian conflict
May 1	Bombing	0	0	Oslo, Norway	Petter Kristian Kyvik threw a bomb at a train during a May Day parade, when it passed the corner of University Street and Stortingsgaten. Erik Blücher was screened for participating, but the charges was later.	Petter Kristian Kyvik	
May 11	Shooting	5 (+2)	5	Colombia	M-19 militants assault the town of Belen de Los Andaquies in Caqueta. The commander of the police post, the local judge and two rebels were killed. In another attack the same day FARC militants killed at least 3 soldiers and wounded 5 others. In Cauca, a landowner and his son were executed by FARC.	M-19 and FARC	Colombian conflict
June 3	Shooting	4	0	Santander Department, Colombia	FARC guerrillas kill a councilman and three leaders of the Liberal Party in the village of Las Trochas, municipality of La Paz.	FARC	Colombian conflict
June 16	Massacre	50+		Aleppo, Syria	The Aleppo Artillery School massacre was a massacre of Syrian Army cadets by members of the Muslim Brotherhood in Syria.	Muslim Brotherhood in Syria	Islamist uprising in Syria
June 20	Hijacking	0	0	Chicago, United States	Serbian nationalist Nikola Kavaja hijacks American Airlines Flight 293 with the intention of crashing it into the headquarters of the Yugoslav Communist Party, but was persuaded out of doing so by his lawyer.	Nikola Kavaja	
July 28	Bombings	7	100+	Madrid, Spain	ETA-pm carries out a series of coordinated bombings targeting Barajas Airport, Atocha station and Chamartín station.	ETA-pm	Basque conflict
August 27	Bombing, assassination	4	6	Mullaghmore, Ireland	Louis Mountbatten, 1st Earl Mountbatten of Burma and three others are killed by a bomb that was planted on his boat.	PIRA	The Troubles
August 27	Bombings, shooting	19	7	Warrenpoint, Northern Ireland	The Provisional IRA ambushes a British Army convoy, detonating two roadside bombs and firing on the soldiers after the blasts. The attack was the deadliest on the British Army during The Troubles	PIRA	The Troubles
October 12	Assassination	1		The Hague, Netherlands	Ahmet Benler, the son of Özdemir Benler, the Turkish ambassador to the Netherlands, was assassinated. The responsibility for this was claimed separately by ASALA and JCAG.	Armenian Secret Army for the Liberation of Armenia and Justice Commandos of the Armenian Genocide	
November 15	Attempted bombing	0	12	United States	A bomb that was planted on American Airlines Flight 444 only partially explodes and filled the passenger's cabin with smoke, injuring 12 people through smoke inhalation. Had the bomb properly detonated, it would have destroyed the plane. The attack was the catalyst for the Unabomber case, though it was not the Unabomber's first attack.	Unabomber	
November 20 – December 4	Hostage-taking	127 (+117)	450+	Mecca, Saudi Arabia	Hundreds of militants from Wahabi group Ikhwan seized the Masjid al-Haram, Islam's holiest site, and demanded the overthrow of the House of Saud and institution of an Islamic state. The two-week siege resulted in the deaths of about 250 people and injury of hundreds more.	Ikhwan	
December 28	Shooting, Raid	0? (+10)	Unknown	Tolima, Colombia	An attack in the by FARC guerrillas in the boundary of the municipalities of the Victoria in Caldas and Mariquita (Tolima).	FARC	Colombian conflict

== See also ==
- List of terrorist incidents
