= The Troubles in Lisburn =

Incidents in Lisburn, Northern Ireland during the Troubles

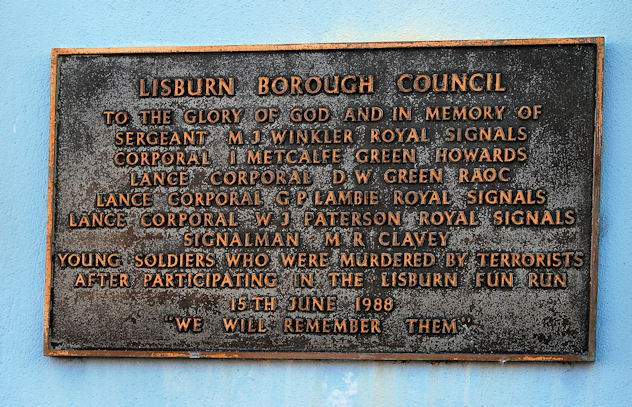
Memorial plaque in Lisburn to British soldiers killed in the 1988 'Fun Run' bombing

The Troubles in Lisburn recounts incidents during, and the effects of, the Troubles in Lisburn, County Antrim, Northern Ireland.

Incidents in Lisburn during the Troubles resulting in fatalities:

== 1976 ==
- 25 January 1976 - Raymond Mayes (33) and John Tennyson (27), both Catholic civilians, were killed in a bomb attack by the Ulster Defence Association (UDA) on the Hibernian Social Club, Trinity Terrace, Lisburn.
- 9 March 1976 - Anthony O'Reilly (43) and Myles O'Reilly (41), both Catholic civilians and restaurant owners, were shot dead during a gun and bomb attack by the Ulster Volunteer Force (UVF) on their Golden Pheasant Inn, Ballynahinch Road, Baillies Mills, near Lisburn.
- 21 September 1976 - Seamus Muldoon (29) a Catholic civilian, died from injuries received in a UDA gun attack eleven days previously in the Tonagh estate in Lisburn.

== 1978 ==
- 22 April 1978 - Millar McAllister (36), a constable in the Royal Ulster Constabulary (RUC), was shot dead at his home in front of his family at Woodland Park by the Provisional Irish Republican Army (IRA).

== 1980 ==
- 17 January 1980 - Mark Cochrane (17) and Abayoni Olorunda (35), both civilians, and Kevin Delaney (26), a member of the Provisional Irish Republican Army, were killed in a premature bomb explosion while travelling on the train between Lisburn and Belfast.

== 1983 ==
- 25 September 1983 - James Ferris (43), a prison officer in the Northern Ireland Prison Service, was stabbed during the Maze Prison escape. He died of a heart attack two days later.

== 1985 ==
- 8 November 1985- Kevin McPolin (26), a Catholic civilian, was killed by the UDA in the Old Warren estate. Prominent loyalist Michael Stone was convicted for the attack.

== 1987 ==
- 12 June 1987 – Joseph McIlwaine (20), a part-time private in the Ulster Defence Regiment, was shot dead at his civilian place of work at Aberdelgy Golf Club Lambeg, Lisburn by the Provisional Irish Republican Army.
- 22 December 1987 - Ulster Defence Association leader John McMichael (38) was killed in a car bomb outside his home in the loyalist Hilden estate. The attack was claimed by the Provisional Irish Republican Army.

== 1988 ==
- 15 June 1988 - Derek Green (20), Michael Winkler (31), Mark Clavey (24), Graham Lambie (22), William Paterson (22) and Ian Metcalfe (36), off duty members of the British Army, were killed by a Provisional Irish Republican Army booby trap bomb attached to their minibus, Market Place, Lisburn. (See 1988 Lisburn van bombing).
- 2 August 1988 – John Warnock (45) a Detective Constable in the Royal Ulster Constabulary, was killed when an under vehicle booby trap bomb exploded under his car at Sloan Street Lisburn. The Provisional Irish Republican Army claimed responsibility for his murder.

== 1989 ==
- 25 January 1989- David Dornan (26) a Protestant civilian was shot by the UDA on a building site on the Knockmore Road.A case of mistaken identify he was assumed to be a Catholic.
- 24 June 1989- Liam McKee (39) a Catholic civilian was killed by the UDA at his home in Donard Drive.A man later convicted of the killing was also a member of the Ulster Defence Regiment.
- 8 October 1989- Alwyn Harris (51) a Protestant RUC officer was killed by an IRA car bomb near his home in Dalboyne Gardens.

== 1990 ==
- 13 March 1990- Clifford Lyness (25) a Protestant believed to be a member of an unspecified loyalist group, was killed in a botched robbery in Howard Place.
- 15 July 1990- Martin Hughes (34) a Catholic civilian was killed at his home in Huguenot Drive by the UDA.
- 23 September 1990 - William Allister (46), civilian, and George Friars (28), a member of the Ulster Defence Association, were shot dead by the Ulster Freedom Fighters while in the County Down Arms, Hillhall Road, Lisburn. Friars was an alleged informer and died on 7 October 1990.

== 1991 ==
- 18 March 1991- Francis Taggart (17) a Catholic civilian was stabbed to death by a group of loyalists close to the town's leisure centre.
- 24 August 1991- Martin Watters (27) a Catholic civilian was beaten to death by a group containing UVF members close to the River Lagan.

== 1992 ==
- 30 January 1992- Paul Moran (33) a Catholic civilian was shot by the UDA outside a newsagents on the Longstone Road.

== 1994 ==
- 11 July 1994- Ray Smallwoods (44) a Protestant former loyalist prisoner and Ulster Democratic Party chairman was shot at his home in Donard Drive by the IRA.

== 1996 ==
- 11 October 1996 - James Bradwell (43), a member of the British Army, died four days after being injured during an IRA car bomb attack on Thiepval British Army headquarters.
