= List of terrorist incidents in 1982 =

This is a timeline of incidents in 1982 that have been labelled as "terrorism" and are not believed to have been carried out by a government or its forces (see state terrorism and state-sponsored terrorism).

== Guidelines ==
- To be included, entries must be notable (have a stand-alone article) and described by a consensus of reliable sources as "terrorism".
- List entries must comply with the guidelines outlined in the manual of style under MOS:TERRORIST.
- Casualty figures in this list are the total casualties of the incident including immediate casualties and later casualties (such as people who succumbed to their wounds long after the attacks occurred).
- Casualties listed are the victims. Perpetrator casualties are listed separately (e.g. x (+y) indicate that x victims and y perpetrators were killed/injured).
- Casualty totals may be underestimated or unavailable due to a lack of information. A figure with a plus (+) sign indicates that at least that many people have died (e.g. 10+ indicates that at least 10 people have died) – the actual toll could be considerably higher. A figure with a plus (+) sign may also indicate that over that number of people are victims.
- If casualty figures are 20 or more, they will be shown in **bold**. In addition, figures for casualties more than 50 will also be **underlined**.
- Incidents are limited to one per location per day. If multiple attacks occur in the same place on the same day, they will be merged into a single incident.
- In addition to the guidelines above, the table also includes the following categories:

0 people were killed/injured by the incident.
1–19 people were killed/injured by the incident.
20–49 people were killed/injured by the incident.
50–99 people were killed/injured by the incident.
100+ people were killed/injured by the incident.

== List ==
Date	Type	Dead	Injured	Location	Details	Perpetrator	Part of
March	Shooting, Prison Break	9 (+15)	Unknown	Ayacucho, Peru	An armed command of the Sendero Luminoso group stormed the city jail, to free people imprisoned for crimes related to subversion, releasing 70 senderistas and 304 common criminals. Later, combined forces of the National Police executed three Senderista detainees who were wounded in the hospital of Huamanga.	Sendero Luminoso	Internal conflict in Peru
4 May	Assassination	1		Somerville, Massachusetts	Assassination of Orhan Gündüz, Turkish businessman and diplomat	Justice Commandos of the Armenian Genocide	
18 April	Shooting	5	Unknown	Santander Department, Colombia	In the village of La Paragua, municipality of Santa Helena del Opon, guerrillas of the IV front of the FARC shot dead 5 peasants.	FARC	Colombian conflict
3 June	Attempted assassination	0	1	London, United Kingdom	Three gunmen from the Abu Nidal Organization opened fire on Israeli ambassador to the UK Shlomo Argov, paralyzing him. The attack led to the 1982 Lebanon war.	Abu Nidal Organization	1982 Lebanon war
7 June	Assassination	1		Lisbon, Portugal	Assassination of Erkut Akbay, the Turkish administrative attaché. He was assassinated near his home as he returned for lunch.	Justice Commandos of the Armenian Genocide	
14 June	Shooting	8	0	San Vicente del Caguán, Colombia	1 captain and 7 soldiers die in an attack on FARC front III in San Vicente del Caguan.	FARC	Colombian conflict
2 July	Bombing	1	11	Oslo, Norway	1 person was killed by a home-made bomb at the Central Station and injuring 11 others. On 9 October an 18-year-old man confessed that he was behind the attack.	Lone wolf	
20 July	Bombings	11	50	London, England	11 people were killed, and 50 others injured in two separate bombings at British military ceremonies in Hyde Park and Regent's Park. Seven horses are also killed.	Provisional Irish Republican Army	The Troubles
7 August	Shooting, bombing, hostage-taking	9 (+1 attacker)	72 (+1 attacker)	Ankara, Turkey	Two gunmen from the Armenian Secret Army for the Liberation of Armenia open fire on and bomb Esenboğa International Airport before taking hostages. 1 attacker is killed and the other is arrested and executed.	ASALA	
9 August	Shooting, bombing	6	22	Paris, France	Two men believed to be members of the Abu Nidal Organization open fire on a Jewish restaurant in the Marais district.	Abu Nidal Organization	Israeli–Palestinian conflict
11 August	Bombing	1	16	Pacific Ocean, near Hawaii	A bomb exploded on Pan Am Flight 830, killing a Japanese teenager. A Jordanian named Mohammed Rashed, who was linked to 15 May Organization, was convicted of placing the bomb on the plane.	15 May Organization	
14 September	Shooting, ambush	4	1	Errenteria, Spain	Six members of ETA stalk and open fire on 5 Civil Guards, killing four and wounding one.	ETA	Basque conflict
16–18 September	Massacre	460–3,500		Beirut, Lebanon	Hundreds of Palestinian and Lebanese Shi'a civilians are massacred by Israel Defense Force ally Kataeb Party.	Kataeb Party	Lebanese Civil War
18 September	Shooting	0	4	Brussels, Belgium	Four people are wounded when a synagogue is attacked in a "shoot and run" incident. Guards were taken by surprise and the gunman, believed to be from the Abu Nidal Organization, escaped.	Abu Nidal Organization	Israeli–Palestinian conflict
29 September	Poisoning/Mass Murder	7	0	Chicago area, Illinois United States	During the Chicago Tylenol murders, seven people throughout the West and Northwest Suburbs die within days of each other beginning 29 September, when all of them ingest Tylenol-branded Extra Strength aspirin laced with potassium cyanide. The perpetrator to this day is unknown.	Unknown	Unknown
9 October	Shooting, grenade	1	10	Rome, Italy	Attack with grenades and machine guns on the central synagogue. A child dies, ten people are injured.	Abu Nidal Organization	Israeli–Palestinian conflict
23 October	Shooting	1 (+3)	Unknown	Cundinamarca Department, Colombia	Militants of the M-19 attack the town of Chia. 1 police and 3 rebels die.	M-19	Colombian conflict
11 November	Suicide bombing	89–102	55	Tyre, Lebanon	A suicide car bomber drove an explosive laden vehicle into Israeli military headquarters, the building was destroyed and 75 Israelis and other Lebanese prisoners died in the blast.	Ahmad Qassir	1982 Lebanon war
18 November	Suicide bombing	1	0	Whanganui, New Zealand	An anarchist suicide bomber targeted the building housing the mainframe of the National Law Enforcement System. The perpetrator was the sole fatality.	Neil Roberts (Lone wolf)	
28 November	Assassination	1	0	Colombia	Gloria Lara de Echeverri, former national director of Community Action and Indigenous Affairs is assassinated by guerrillas.	FARC	Colombian conflict
14 November	Bombing	17	30	Northern Ireland, United Kingdom	Droppin Well bombing – 11 British soldiers and six civilians were killed by an Irish National Liberation Army (INLA) time bomb at the Droppin' Well Bar in Ballykelly, County Londonderry.	Irish National Liberation Army	The Troubles
6–8 December	Shooting, Mass Murder	201	Unknown	Petén Department, Guatemala	The Dos Erres Massacre was carried out by the military and Kaibiles ('elite forces') of the Armed Forces of Guatemala1 – during the government of President General Efraín Ríos Montt – in a parcelamento (village) of La Libertad. The massacre took place during the Guatemalan Civil War.	Guatemalan Army and Patrullas de Autodefensa Civil	Guatemalan Civil War
23 December	Bombings	0	2	Sydney, Australia	A bomb exploded outside the Israeli Consulate, injuring two and causing extensive damage. A few hours later, a bomb partially exploded outside a Jewish soccer club. No one was injured in this bombing. No one has ever been convicted for these bombings.	Unknown	

== See also ==
- List of terrorist incidents
