= Lisburn van bombing =

1988 IRA attack in Northern Ireland

1988 Lisburn van bombing
- Part of the Troubles
- Wreckage of the soldiers' van after the explosion

- Location: 54°30′36.30″N 6°2′48.27″W; Market Place, Lisburn, County Antrim, Northern Ireland
- Date: 15 June 1988; 20:59 (BST)
- Attack type: Bombing
- Weapon: Bomb
- Deaths: 6 British soldiers
- Injuries: 11 civilians
- Perpetrator: Provisional Irish Republican Army Belfast Brigade

On 15 June 1988 an unmarked military van carrying six British Army soldiers was blown up by the Provisional Irish Republican Army (IRA) at Market Place in Lisburn, Northern Ireland. The explosion took place at the end of a charity marathon run in which the soldiers had participated. All six soldiers were killed in the attack – four outright, one on his way to hospital and another later on in hospital.

Lisburn is the headquarters of the British Army in Northern Ireland. Four of the dead were from the Royal Corps of Signals whilst the other two were from the Green Howards and the Royal Army Ordnance Corps. A booby-trap bomb was hidden under the Ford Transit van in which the soldiers were travelling, and was designed in such a way that the blast went upwards to cause maximum damage to the vehicle. Eleven civilian bystanders were injured, including a two-year-old child and 80-year-old man.

The bombing is sometimes referred to as the Lisburn "Fun Run" bombing.

== Bombing ==
On Wednesday 15 June 1988 at 8:50pm, an unmarked blue Ford Transit van carrying six off-duty British soldiers in civilian clothes drove off from a leisure centre carpark in Lisburn. The soldiers had just taken part in the "Lisburn Fun Run", a 13-mile (21 km) charity half marathon held in the town. They had left the van unattended in the car park, which was the start and finish point for the run. It was there that an IRA Active Service Unit (ASU), who had been following the van, hid a bomb underneath the vehicle. The half marathon and shorter "fun runs" were organised by Lisburn Borough Council, together with the YMCA, to raise funds for the disabled. There were 4,500 participants that day and at least 200 British Army personnel had been given leave to participate in the event.

Nine minutes later, the van stopped at traffic lights at Market Place, in Lisburn's town centre. As the van moved on, the seven-pound (3.2 kg) bomb detonated, turning the van into a massive fireball and instantly killing four of the soldiers as the vehicle disintegrated with the force of the blast. The semtex device had been designed in a cone shape to channel the blast upwards, thereby causing maximum damage to the vehicle and the soldiers inside. The area around Market Place was crowded with onlookers, including many teenagers and families with young children, although the biggest crowd was at the carpark. In all, about 10,000 onlookers had attended the charity run. There was pandemonium as frightened parents searched for their children, whilst others rushed to give aid to the dead and dying soldiers before fire engines and ambulances arrived.

Eleven civilian bystanders were injured in the attack, including a two-year-old child and an 80-year-old man. Another soldier died on the way to hospital whilst a sixth soldier died later that night after undergoing surgery for severe head injuries. The dead soldiers were stationed at Ebrington Barracks in Derry and were returning to base when the bomb went off. Four of the men – Sergeant Michael Winkler (31), Signalman Mark Clavey (24), Lance Corporal Graham Lambie (22), and Corporal William Patterson (22) – were from the Royal Signals, whilst the other two – Corporal Ian Metcalf (36) and Lance Corporal Derek Green (20) – were from the Green Howards and Royal Army Ordnance Corps respectively.

Lisburn is a mainly Ulster Protestant town, 14 miles (23 km) southwest of Belfast. It serves as the garrison headquarters of the British Army in Northern Ireland. Six months before the van bombing, a booby-trap bomb planted by the IRA killed Ulster Defence Association (UDA) leader John McMichael in the town.

The van bombing resulted in the greatest loss of life suffered by the British Army since 11 soldiers were killed in the Droppin Well Disco bombing on 6 December 1982.

In Belfast, on the same day as the Lisburn attack, the IRA shot dead the Ulster Volunteer Force (UVF)'s East Belfast commander, Robert "Squeak" Seymour (33). This was retaliation for the UVF gun attack on an Irish nationalist pub in which three Catholics died.

== Aftermath ==
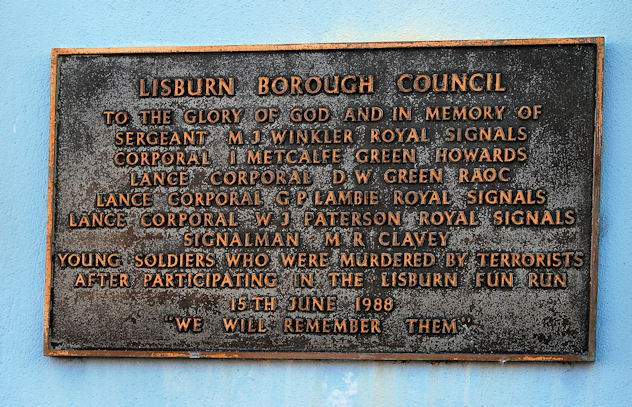
Memorial plaque in Lisburn

On 16 June, the Provisional IRA Belfast Brigade claimed responsibility for the bombing, promising to wage "unceasing war" against the British security forces in Northern Ireland. Sinn Féin president Gerry Adams allegedly said that the IRA's killing of the six soldiers was "vastly preferable" to killing members of the (locally recruited) Ulster Defence Regiment (UDR) or Royal Ulster Constabulary (RUC). The leisure centre was forced to remain shut for a time after the loyalist Protestant Action Force (a covername of the UVF) issued a warning that they regarded Catholic staff working there as "legitimate targets", inferring that they may have had a hand in the bombing. Lisburn mayor Councillor William Bleakes condemned the threats by the PAF.

That same day, Tom King, then Secretary of State for Northern Ireland, travelled to Lisburn where he held a meeting with Lieutenant General Sir John Waters, the British Army Commander in Northern Ireland, and senior RUC officers. They discussed the attack and proposals for heightened security. The soldiers had failed to follow proper security procedures, as they had left their vehicle unguarded for over two hours and had then driven off without having checked under it beforehand. After the Lisburn meeting, King flew to London where he reported directly to British Prime Minister Margaret Thatcher, who described the attack as a "terrible atrocity". However, she rejected demands from Conservative members of Parliament to bring back internment, regarding the proposal as "a very serious step".

In his statement to the House of Commons, Tom King suggested that there would have been a much higher death toll had the bomb exploded in the carpark, where thousands of people had gathered after the run.

The Republic of Ireland's government also strongly condemned the killings and extended its sympathy to the families of the dead soldiers. The bombing was a topic of debate in the Seanad Éireann on 16 June 1988. Bishop Cahal Daly of Down and Connor denounced the bombers and the killings in the "strongest possible terms".

Questions were raised as to how the IRA knew the soldiers were attending the charity run in Lisburn, how they recognised their unmarked van, and how the unit was able to plant a bomb in the predominantly loyalist town without being spotted, despite the number of people in the carpark. The RUC believed that the bombers may have been wearing sports gear as they mingled with the crowd that evening; they appealed to onlookers who had attended the event to hand over any film they may have taken of the "fun run" in an attempt to identify the IRA bombers.

The following Saturday, between 1,000 and 2,000 people gathered in Lisburn town centre to attend a remembrance service for the six soldiers. A book of condolences was also opened.

== See also ==
- Ballygawley bus bombing
- Lisburn barracks bombing
