= Plaza Miranda bombing =

1971 bombing of a Liberal Party rally in Manila, Philippines

- A still from the documentary film Batas Militar, showing Liberal Party members onstage at the Plaza Miranda, moments before the bombing.
- Location: 14°35′53″N 120°59′01″E; Plaza Miranda, Quiapo, Manila, Philippines
- Date: August 21, 1971 (UTC +8)
- Target: Liberal Party members, political campaign
- Attack type: Bombing
- Weapon: Grenade
- Deaths: 9
- Injuries: 95

The Plaza Miranda bombing (Filipino: Pambobomba sa Liwasang Miranda) occurred during a political rally of the Liberal Party at Plaza Miranda, Quiapo district, Manila, the Philippines on August 21, 1971. It caused nine deaths and injured 95 others, including many prominent Liberal Party politicians.

== Bombing ==
The Liberal Party's campaign rally was held to proclaim the candidacies of eight senatorial bids as well as the candidate for the mayoralty race in Manila. After local Liberal candidates for Manila were proclaimed, Manila LP chairman Salvador Mariño, the emcee for the event, began to speak before an audience of about 4,000 when two grenades were reportedly tossed on stage.

== Victims ==
Among those killed instantly were a 10-year-old child and The Manila Times photographer Ben Roxas. Almost everyone on stage was injured, including representatives Ramon V. Mitra Jr. of Palawan and Salipada Pendatun of Cotabato, Senators Jovito Salonga, Eva Estrada-Kalaw, and Gerardo Roxas (also Liberal Party president), Judy Araneta-Roxas, former representative Eddie Ilarde of Rizal, former Cebu City mayor Sergio Osmeña Jr., Governor Felicisimo San Luis of Laguna, Manila Councilors Martin B. Isidro and Ambrosio "King" Lorenzo Jr., and Congressman Ramon Bagatsing, the party's mayoral candidate for Manila.

Salonga was among those most seriously injured. The blast left him blind in one eye and deaf in one ear. Small pieces of shrapnel remained lodged in his body until his death in 2016. Councilor Ambrosio "King" Lorenzo Jr. was in a coma for two weeks. He lost sight in his left eye and hearing on the same side. Ramon Bagatsing, the Liberal Party mayoralty candidate for Manila, lost his left leg and suffered a crushed right cheek bone and a shattered right arm.

== Suspects ==
Marcos blamed the communists and subsequently suspended the privilege of the writ of habeas corpus.

During the police investigation into the bombing, Manila Mayor Antonio Villegas was initially named the primary suspect of the bombing, but later evidence suggested otherwise. Suspicion of responsibility for the blast fell upon incumbent President Ferdinand Marcos. At the time, there was suspicion that Marcos perpetrated the bombing as a pretext for his declaration of martial law. There were a series of deadly bombings in 1971, and the CIA privately stated that Marcos was responsible for at least one of them. The agency was also almost certain that none of the bombings were perpetrated by Communists. Defectors from Marcos' cabinet also contained further evidence implicating Marcos. A proven false flag attack took place with the attempted assassination of Defense Minister Juan Ponce Enrile in 1972. President Richard Nixon then approved Marcos' martial law move on the rationale that the country was being terrorized by Communists.

Some prominent personalities laid the blame on the Communist Party of the Philippines (CPP) under Jose Maria Sison. Jovito Salonga, in his autobiography, stated his belief that Sison and the CPP were responsible. Retired Armed Forces general Victor Corpus, a former New People's Army member who defected from the group in 1976, alleged in a 2004 interview that Sison dispatched the cadre who attacked the meeting with a hand grenade. In the prologue of his 1989 autobiography, Corpus claimed that he was present when some leaders of the CPP discussed the bombing after it took place. In interviews by The Washington Post, unnamed former CPP officials alleged that "the (Communist) party leadership planned -- and three operatives carried out -- the attack in an attempt to provoke government repression and push the country to the brink of revolution... Sison had calculated that Marcos could be provoked into cracking down on his opponents, thereby driving thousands of political activists into the underground, the former party officials said. Recruits were urgently needed, they said, to make use of a large influx of weapons and financial aid that China had already agreed to provide." José María Sison has denied these accusations and the CPP has never claimed responsibility for the incident.

Historian Joseph Scalice has argued that "the evidence of history now overwhelmingly suggests that the Communist Party of the Philippines, despite being allied with the Liberal Party, was responsible for this bombing, seeing it as a means of facilitating repression which they argued would hasten revolution." Sison, however, continued to deny this claim, arguing that Scalice, alongside his primary source, columnist Gregg Jones used sources from military intelligence and rejectionists.

== Aftermath ==
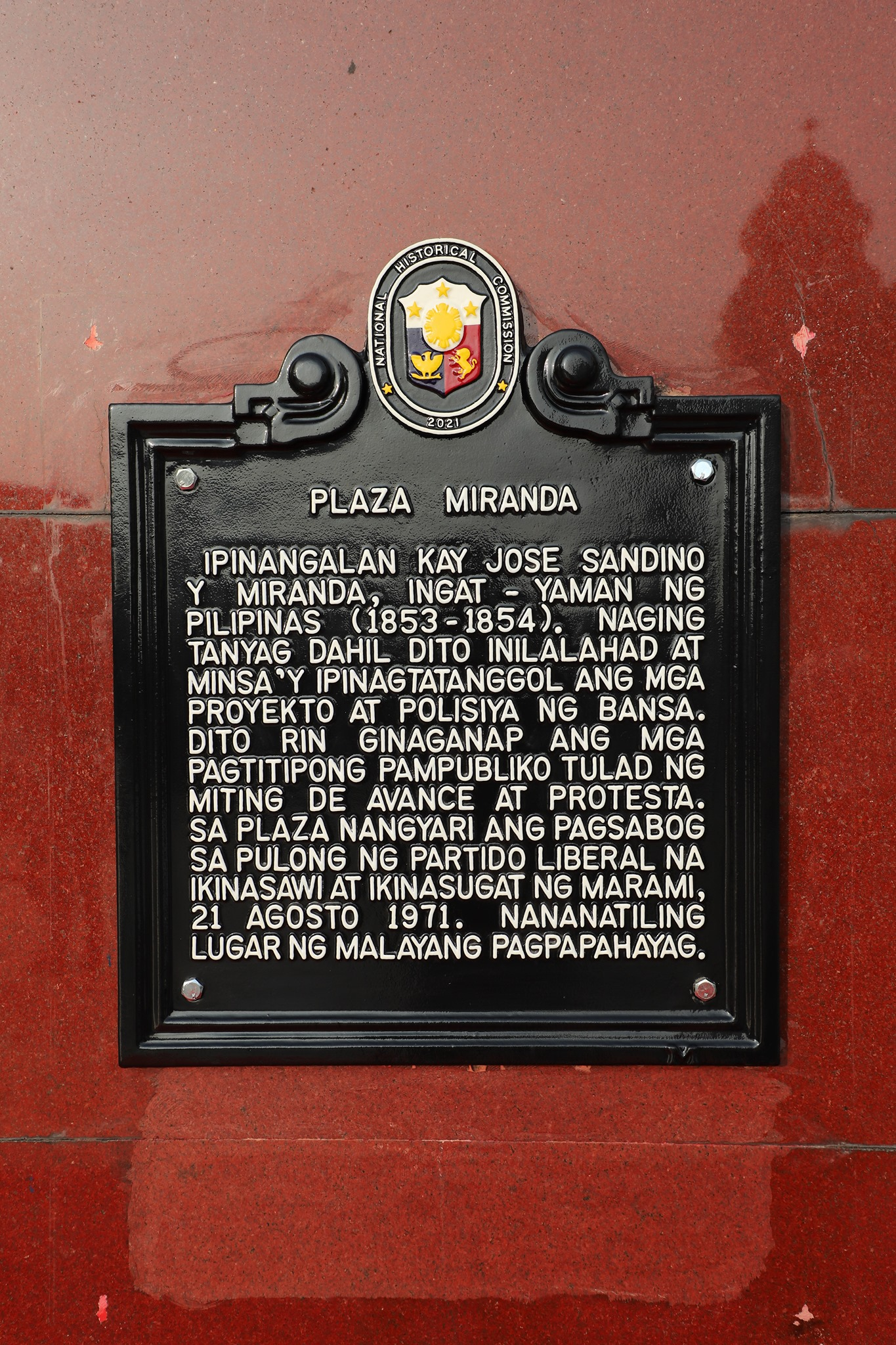
National Historical Commission of the Philippines' historical marker commemorating Plaza Miranda, unveiled on the 50th anniversary of the bombing.

=== Assumption of emergency powers by President Marcos ===
Having blamed communists, Marcos used the bombing to justify his subsequent suspension of the writ of habeas corpus, an act which would later be seen as a prelude to the declaration of Martial Law more than a year later.

=== Radicalization of the moderate opposition ===
Historians note that Marcos' suspension of the writ of Habeas Corpus was the event that forced many members of the moderate opposition, including figures like Edgar Jopson, to join the ranks of the radicals. In the aftermath of the bombing, Marcos lumped all of the opposition together and referred to them as communists, and many former moderates fled to the mountain encampments of the radical opposition to avoid being arrested by Marcos' forces. Those who became disenchanted with the excesses of the Marcos administration and wanted to join the opposition after 1971 often joined the ranks of the radicals, simply because they represented the only group vocally offering opposition to the Marcos government.

=== Bearing on the election ===
In a setback for Marcos' ruling Nacionalista Party, the Liberals took six of the eight contested Senate seats, as well as the Manila mayoralty with then Congressman Ramon Bagatsing defeating the incumbent Antonio Villegas for the mayorship of the country's premiere city.

== Commemoration ==
On August 21, 2002, President Gloria Macapagal Arroyo unveiled a commemorative marker in Plaza Miranda in honor of the nine innocent civilians killed in the blast.

== See also ==
- Assassination of Ninoy Aquino
- Jovito Salonga
- Ramon Bagatsing
- List of terrorist incidents in 1971
- Movement of Concerned Citizens for Civil Liberties
