= List of terrorist incidents in 1984 =

This is a timeline of incidents in 1984 that have been labelled as "terrorism" and are not believed to have been carried out by a government or its forces (see state terrorism and state-sponsored terrorism).

== Guidelines ==
- To be included, entries must be notable (have a stand-alone article) and described by a consensus of reliable sources as "terrorism".
- List entries must comply with the guidelines outlined in the manual of style under MOS:TERRORIST.
- Casualty figures in this list are the total casualties of the incident including immediate casualties and later casualties (such as people who succumbed to their wounds long after the attacks occurred).
- Casualties listed are the victims. Perpetrator casualties are listed separately (e.g. x (+y) indicate that x victims and y perpetrators were killed/injured).
- Casualty totals may be underestimated or unavailable due to a lack of information. A figure with a plus (+) sign indicates that at least that many people have died (e.g. 10+ indicates that at least 10 people have died) – the actual toll could be considerably higher. A figure with a plus (+) sign may also indicate that over that number of people are victims.
- If casualty figures are 20 or more, they will be shown in **bold**. In addition, figures for casualties more than 50 will also be **underlined**.
- Incidents are limited to one per location per day. If multiple attacks occur in the same place on the same day, they will be merged into a single incident.
- In addition to the guidelines above, the table also includes the following categories:

0 people were killed/injured by the incident.
1–19 people were killed/injured by the incident.
20–49 people were killed/injured by the incident.
50–99 people were killed/injured by the incident.
100+ people were killed/injured by the incident.

== List ==
Date	Type	Dead	Injured	Location	Details	Perpetrator	Part of
January 1		0	3	Tripoli, Lebanon	Tripoli, Lebanon: Guerrillas bomb a French cultural center and the car of an Israeli-backed militia leader. Three Lebanese were injured in the two attacks.	Islamic Jihad	Lebanese Civil War
January 18		1	0	Beirut, Lebanon	Malcolm Kerr, president of the American University of Beirut was killed by gunmen belonging to Islamic Jihad.	Islamic Jihad	Lebanese Civil War
January 21		1	0	Rome, Lazio	The Libyan ambassador in Italy Ammar D. el-Taggazy, was shot when he was outside his home, dying for his wounds in February 11.	Al-Borkan Liberation Organization	Terrorism in Italy
January 23		1	5	San Miguel, El Salvador	The bombing of a commuter plane by leftist rebels killed one person and injured another five.	FMLN	Salvadoran Civil War
30 January		0	1	Santiago, Chile	A policeman was shot and wounded by extremists near his home	Manuel Rodríguez Patriotic Front	Armed resistance in Chile (1973–90)
January 31		2	0	Forkhill, United Kingdom	Two police officers were killed when driving by a 500 kg-bomb planted in a roadside ditch by the IRA.	Provisional IRA	The Troubles
February 6–7		15 (+7)	Unknown	Cimitarra, Colombia: FARC	FARC militants shoot dead at least 15 peasants on two farms (La Traviata and Las Palmas) located in Santander Department.	FARC Militants and M-19	Colombian conflict
February 23		1	0	Guipuzcoa, Spain	Senator Enrique Casas was murdered at the door of his house on the third anniversary of the failed 23-F state coup by the terrorist group Comandos Autónomos Anticapitalistas. This group made him responsible for the repression of the left in the Basque Country because of his status as a member of the regional Security Board.	Comandos Autónomos Anticapitalistas	Basque conflict
February 28		18	21	San Antonio Grande, El Salvador	The bombing of two trains by leftist guerrillas left 18 people dead and 21 injured.	FMLN	Salvadoran Civil War
February 28		0	21	Jerusalem, Israel	Jaffa Road attack: 21 people were injured after two grenades exploded outside a clothing store on Jaffa Road.	DFLP and/or Abu Nidal	Israeli–Palestinian conflict
March 1		0	4	Valparaíso, Chile	An explosive device detonated in a street injuring 4 people	Revolutionary Left Movement	Armed resistance in Chile (1973–90)
March 7		3	9	Ashdod, Israel	Three killed and nine injured in the bombing of a bus.	PLO	Israel-Palestine conflict
April 2		0 (+1)	48	Jerusalem, Israel	King George Street attack: 48 people are wounded by a machine gun attack on a crowded shopping mall. One attacker was shot by armed civilians.	DFLP and/or Abu Nidal	Israeli–Palestinian conflict
April 12–13		1 (+4)	8	Tel Aviv, Israel	Bus 300 affair: Four PFLP members hijacked an Egged bus. During a counter-operation, one civilian and two hijackers were killed and eight more civilians injured. The remaining two hijackers were immediately executed after capture by IDF soldiers.	PFLP	Israeli–Palestinian conflict
April 19		24-200	30	Huambo, Angola	The bombing of barracks housing Soviet and Cuban military officers killed at least 24 people and injured 30 more, though some news agencies reported up to 200 people dead. The National Union for the Total Independence of Angola claimed responsibility for the bombing.	UNITA	Angolan Civil War
April 20		0	22	London, United Kingdom	1984 Heathrow Airport bombing: A bomb exploded in the baggage area of Terminal 2 at London Heathrow Airport. The bomb exploded at 7:55 pm, as 60 people were inside the baggage area. The blast injured 22, one seriously. No one has claimed responsibly for the bombing.	Unknown	
May 13		0	13	Alfortville, France	Alfortville Armenian Genocide Memorial bombings: Three bombs explode at a recently dedicated memorial to the Armenian genocide in a Paris suburb, injuring thirteen people, two seriously. The attack was organized by Grey Wolves member Abdullah Çatlı and the Turkish MİT.		Grey Wolves
July 6		12+	20+	Baghdad, Iraq	A truck bomb exploding at the Iraqi Popular Army headquarters leaves dozens dead and scores injured.	Iran-backed rebels	Iran–Iraq War
July 10		1	0	Sarafand, Lebanon	A bomb planted in his car killed mayor Jawad Khalifeh of Sarafand.	Islamic Jihad	Lebanese Civil War
July 12		5	26	Durban, South Africa	A car bomb exploding at an industrial area kills 5 and injures 26.	ANC (suspected)	Internal resistance to apartheid
July 15		10-22	55	Chimbolo, Angola	A bomb exploding near a major pipeline in Cabinda Province killed 10 to 22 people. 55 others were injured.	UNITA	Angolan Civil War
July 15		21	4	San Antonio Grande, El Salvador	Guerrillas bombed an empty freight train before firing at the 25 treasury policemen aboard, killing 21 of them and leaving the other four injured.	FMLN	Salvadoran Civil War
August 3		33	27	Kancheepuram district, India	Meenambakkam bomb blast: A time bomb blast in the counter of Air Lanka, Chennai International Airport, Tirusulam, killed at least 29. Blame placed on LTTE.	LTTE	Sri Lankan Civil War
August 15		3	11	Siirt, Turkey	1984 PKK attacks Kurdistan Workers' Party (PKK) forces attacked the gendarmerie station in Eruh and killed one gendarmerie soldier and injured six soldiers and three civilians. Simultaneously, PKK forces attacked a gendarmerie open-air facility, officer housings and a gendarmerie station in Şemdinli, Hakkâri Province and killed two police officers and injured one police officer and a soldier.	PKK	Kurdish–Turkish conflict
August 21		18	300	Tehran, Iran	A powerful blast in Rah Ahan railroad station, kills 18 and injures 300. Blame placed on Mujahadin Khalq guerrilla group.	Mujahadin Khalq	Iran–Iraq War
August 29 – October 10		0	751	The Dalles, United States	1984 Rajneeshee bioterror attack: The Rajneeshee cult spreads salmonella in salad bars at ten restaurants to influence a local election. Health officials say that 751 people were sickened and more than 40 hospitalized. See also 1984 Rajneeshee bioterror attack	Rajneeshee	
September 20		23 (+1)	0	Beirut, Lebanon	1984 United States embassy annex bombing: Hezbollah suicide car bombing of the U.S. embassy annex.	Hezbollah	Lebanese Civil War
October 12		5	31	Brighton, United Kingdom	Brighton hotel bombing by the IRA; five are killed in an attempt to kill Prime Minister Margaret Thatcher and members of the Cabinet.	PIRA	The Troubles
October 27		0	5	Santiago, Chile	A car bomb exploded near a military base, wounding five people.	Unknown	
October 31		1 (+1)	0	New Delhi, India	Prime minister Indira Gandhi is assassinated by her Sikh bodyguards. The killing was in retaliation for the Indian army's entry into the Golden Temple at Amritsar.	Satwant Singh and Beant Singh	
November 3		4	11	Valparaíso, Chile	A bomb exploded next to a bus filled with riot police, killing four and wounding 11.	Unknown	
November 26		1	6	Bogotá, Colombia	A car bomb explodes in front of the US embassy. 1 dead and 6 wounded in the attack attributed to the Extraditables and the guerrilla command Ricardo Franco.	The Extraditables or Guerrilla Command Ricardo Franco	Colombian conflict
November 30		33	0	Dollar Farm village, Sri Lanka	Kent and Dollar Farm massacres: 33 civilians which included women and children were attacked in the night by an armed group made up of LTTE cadres.	LTTE	Sri Lankan Civil War
November 30		29	0	Kent Farm village, Sri Lanka	Kent and Dollar Farm massacres: 29 civilians including women and children were massacred by LTTE cadres.	LTTE	Sri Lankan Civil War
December 3		11		Kokilai, Sri Lanka	Kokkilai massacre: LTTE cadres kill eleven Sinhalese civilians.	LTTE	Sri Lankan Civil War
December 12		0	1	Madrid	Both Al-Burkan and the Iraqi Sadr Brigade took credit for the 11 September 1984 attack on two Libyan diplomats in Madrid.	Al-Burkan	
December 18		0	12	VI Region of Libertador General Bernardo O'Higgins, Chile	A bomb explodes in the Intendance, leaving 12 wounded.	Unknown	Armed resistance in Chile (1973–90)
December 23		17	267	Florence, Italy	Train 904 bombing: A bomb placed on the Naples–Milan Express Train 904 explodes, killing 17 and wounding 250. The attack is attributed to the Sicilian Mafia. The Italicus Express bombing in 1974 took place on the same line	Sicilian Mafia	
December 31		30		Batticaloa, Sri Lanka	LTTE members kill 4 Tamil civilians and dump them outside Batticaloa for refusing to join the group.	LTTE	Sri Lankan Civil War

== See also ==
- List of terrorist incidents
