= Terrorism in the United Arab Emirates =

Terrorism in the United Arab Emirates describes the terrorist attacks in the United Arab Emirates, as well as steps taken by the Emirati government to counter the threat of terrorism. Although terrorist attacks are rare, the UAE has been listed as a place used by investors to raise funds to support militants in Afghanistan, Pakistan, and the financing of the September 11 attacks. Businesses based in the UAE have been implicated in the funding of the Taliban and the Haqqani network. In the 72nd session of the UN General assembly in New York, UAE foreign minister Abdullah bin Zayed Al Nahyan affirmed the United Arab Emirates policy of zero tolerance towards terrorism financing.

The United Arab Emirates Armed Forces plays an active role in the US-led war on terrorism and have been nicknamed by US defense secretary James Mattis and other United States Armed Forces Generals as "Little Sparta" for being the United States' right-hand ally in the war on terrorism, and for conducting operations effectively against terrorists in the Middle East.

The Cabinet of the United Arab Emirates, following the implementation of the UAE Federal Law No. 7 in November 2014, designated a list of 83 organizations and entities including the Muslim Brotherhood, Al-Qaeda, Taliban, Hezbollah, Houthis and the Islamic State as terrorist organizations.

== History ==
=== Al Qaeda ===
The 9/11 Commission Report states that several 9/11 hijackers traveled to the United States via transiting first in Dubai International Airport. 17 of the 19 hijackers transited through the UAE in the months immediately preceding the 9/11 attacks. The Library of Congress, Research Division in its 2007 report stated, "Dubai is strongly linked to the September 11, 2001 terrorist attack on the United States; more than half of the hijackers flew directly out of Dubai International Airport to the United States". No official connection to state-sponsored terrorism was found between the United Arab Emirates government to the terrorists. The report also indicates that the hijackers received funding from terror investors in the UAE who raised funds through their UAE based business.

According to the 9/11 Commission Report, in response to concerns that the UAE banking system has been used by 9/11 hijackers to launder funds, the UAE adopted legislation giving the Central Bank in 2002 the power to freeze any suspected accounts for 7 days without prior legal permission. The report stated "banks have been advised to carefully monitor transactions passing through the UAE from Saudi Arabia and Pakistan and are now subject to more stringent transaction and client reporting requirements."

Unnamed sceptics in Washington raised concerns that the United Arab Emirates might be associating with Osama bin Laden, citing a missed opportunity for a drone strike in 1999 mentioned in the 9/11 Commission Report which was abandoned due to being located in a UAE run hunting camp in Afghanistan. However, no evidence or proof apart from speculations was presented. According to the CIA in the 9/11 Commission Report, the strike was called off because the intelligence was dubious.

In November 2002, Abd al-Rahim al-Nashiri, the alleged mastermind of the bombing of USS Cole and head of Al Qaeda in the Persian Gulf, was captured in the United Arab Emirates by Emirati authorities.

The family of the late FBI counter-terrorism chief John P. O'Neill, who was killed in the September 11 attacks, filed a lawsuit against Dubai Islamic Bank (DIB), a UAE based bank, implicating the bank that it was directly involved in the funding of the 9/11 hijackers. A total of 8 plaintiffs have filed lawsuits against Dubai Islamic Bank. 2 of the plaintiffs have since withdrawn their lawsuits. In 2016, 5 additional lawsuits were filed in concordance with Justice Against Sponsors of Terrorism Act (JASTA); however, all five lawsuits have been dismissed in 2017. According to Dubai Islamic bank, no provision has been made with any outstanding 9/11 legal proceedings as professional advice indicates that it is unlikely that any significant or material costs or loss, other than legal costs in connection with the defence, are expected to be incurred. DIB expects a complete dismissal from any lawsuits because the evidence uncovered would not permit a fact finder to hold DIB liable for damages and argues that unsubstantiated claims harms its reputation.

A British petroleum engineer who was held as a hostage while working in Yemen was extracted in 2015 by the United Arab Emirates Armed Forces after a military intelligence operation. The hostage was held by Al Qaeda in the Arabian Peninsula in Yemen for 18 months.

An op-ed in The Washington Post by Yousef Al Otaiba, UAE ambassador to the US, indicated that more than 2,000 militants have been removed from Yemen, with their controlled areas now having improved security and a better delivered humanitarian and development assistance such as to the port city of Mukalla and other liberated areas. US defense secretary James Mattis called US-UAE joint counter-terrorism operations against Al Qaeda in Yemen a model for American troops, citing how the United Arab Emirates Armed Forces liberated the port of Mukalla in April 2016 from AQAP forces in 36 hours after being held by AQAP for more than a year. In 2018, a report by the Associated Press suggested that the United Arab Emirates, as part of Saudi-led intervention in Yemen, may have brokered deals with Al-Qaeda militants in Yemen, and have recruited them to fight against the Houthis. UAE Brigadier General Musallam Al Rashidi responded to the report by stating that Al Qaeda cannot be reasoned within the first place and argued that he has men who have been killed by Al Qaeda, he said "They are not willing to negotiate, most of these hard-core guys. They are willing to go and fight. We have guys who have been injured, killed by AQAP and there's no point in negotiating with these guys." The notion of the UAE recruiting or paying AQAP has been thoroughly denied by the United States Pentagon with Colonel Robert Manning, spokesperson of the Pentagon, calling the news source "patently false".

=== Lashkar-e-Taiba ===
Investors based in the UAE are implicated for providing financial aid to the Lashkar-e-Taiba. In 2008, the United Nations Committee conducted an investigation of the terrorist organization Lashkar-e-Tayibba (LeT) which found them to be associated with the 26/11 Mumbai terror attacks. The investigation found that UAE-based banks cleared financial transactions from UAE-based investors which were then used to fund the terrorist organization.

=== Murder of Ibolya Ryan ===
On 1 December 2014, a lone wolf terrorist attack committed by a woman wearing black gloves and a veiled niqab included the murdering of Hungarian-American kindergarten teacher in Abu Dhabi and a failed attempt to plant a home-made bomb at the home of an Arab–American physician. The Hungarian-American teacher, Ibolya Ryan, was stabbed to death by the perpetrator. The stabbing, which took place in Boutik Mall, an Abu Dhabi shopping mall located on Al Reem Island was caught on tape in a routine surveillance video.

The Emirates have classified the murder as a lone wolf terrorist attack inspired by terrorist ideology acquired online.

=== Haqqani Network ===
The Haqqani network, the militant partners of the Afghan Taliban, has received significant funding from UAE-based businesses. In January 2009, the US intelligence sources stated that two of Taliban's senior fundraisers travelled regularly to the UAE where the Haqqani networks and Taliban laundered money via local front companies.

=== Taliban ===
The United Arab Emirates is the only Arab country to serve and contribute forces alongside American Green Beret Special Forces to the mission in Afghanistan. On July 31, 2017, The New York Times published an article reportedly based on the information gathered from the leaked emails of the UAE Ambassador to the US, Yousef Al Otaiba, stating that in June 2013, both Qatar and the United Arab Emirates competed with each to host a Taliban embassy. In response to the article, ambassador Otaiba wrote an open letter to The New York Times on August 9, 2017, claiming that the previously issued article carried half information and as a result, told the half story. Ambassador Otaiba commented on the allegation by arguing that the decision to host the Taliban embassy was requested from the US and the UAE offer was made due to being pressured by the US. The ambassador added that the UAE had presented three conditions to the group and the refusal to accept has led the Gulf nation to withdraw its offer to host them. The three conditions state that "Taliban must denounce Al Qaeda leader Osama bin Laden, recognize the Afghan constitution, and renounce all violence and lay down their weapons. The Taliban refused all three conditions, and the UAE withdrew its offer."

== Measures against state sponsored terrorism ==
=== Lebanon ===
The UAE advises its citizens to avoid traveling to Lebanon because of safety and security concerns due to the increasing influence of Hezbollah across the Lebanese government.

=== Qatar ===
In June 2017, the UAE alongside Bahrain, Egypt, the Maldives, Mauritania, Senegal, Djibouti, the Comoros, Jordan, the Tobruk-based Libyan government, and the Hadi-led Yemeni government severed diplomatic relations with Qatar due to allegations of Qatar being a state sponsor of terrorism, citing sources which implicated that Qatar paid $700 million to Iranian-backed Shi'a militias in Iraq, $120–140 million to Tahrir al-Sham, and $80 million to Ahrar al-Sham.

The UAE, alongside Saudi Arabia, Egypt, and Bahrain moved to implement sanction on Qatar by boycotting and banning air travel, shipping, media, finance, and energy between the two countries unless Qatar complies with a list of 13 demands imposed by Saudi Arabia, the United Arab Emirates, Egypt, and Bahrain. Qatar has denied the accusations put forth by the four countries.

== See also ==
- Islamic terrorism in Europe
- List of terrorist incidents
- Terrorism in the United States
- Hindu terrorism
- Violence against Muslims in independent India
- Left-wing terrorism
- Right-wing terrorism
