= List of terrorist incidents in 1971 =

This is a timeline of incidents in 1971 that have been labelled as "terrorism" and are not believed to have been carried out by a government or its forces (see state terrorism and state-sponsored terrorism).

== Guidelines ==
- To be included, entries must be notable (have a stand-alone article) and described by a consensus of reliable sources as "terrorism".
- List entries must comply with the guidelines outlined in the manual of style under MOS:TERRORIST.
- Casualties figures in this list are the total casualties of the incident including immediate casualties and later casualties (such as people who succumbed to their wounds long after the attacks occurred).
- Casualties listed are the victims. Perpetrator casualties are listed separately (e.g. x (+y) indicate that x victims and y perpetrators were killed/injured).
- Casualty totals may be underestimated or unavailable due to a lack of information. A figure with a plus (+) sign indicates that at least that many people have died (e.g. 10+ indicates that at least 10 people have died) – the actual toll could be considerably higher. A figure with a plus (+) sign may also indicate that over that number of people are victims.
- If casualty figures are 20 or more, they will be shown in **bold**. In addition, figures for casualties more than 50 will also be **underlined**.
- Incidents are limited to one per location per day. If multiple attacks occur in the same place on the same day, they will be merged into a single incident.
- In addition to the guidelines above, the table also includes the following categories:

0 people were killed/injured by the incident.
1–19 people were killed/injured by the incident.
20–49 people were killed/injured by the incident.
50–99 people were killed/injured by the incident.
100+ people were killed/injured by the incident.

== List ==
Date	Type	Dead	Injured	Location	Details	Perpetrator	Part of
January 2	Grenade	2	2	Gaza Strip, Palestine/ Occupied territories	Murder of the Aroyo children: Members of the Palestine Liberation Organization threw a grenade into a car, killing two children.	PLO	Israeli-Palestinian conflict
January 8	Kidnapping	0	1	Montevideo, Uruguay	Kidnapping of the British ambassador Geoffrey Jackson.	Tupamaros	
March 9	Bombing	3	0	Belfast, Northern Ireland	Three off-duty Scottish soldiers (John McCaig, Joseph McCaig and Dougald McCaughey) were shot dead by the IRA after being lured from a pub.	Provisional IRA	The Troubles
April 7	Shooting	1	2	Stockholm, Sweden	1971 Yugoslav Embassy shooting: Miro Barešić and another Ustasa supporter took the Yugoslav ambassador hostage at the embassy. They tied a rope to his neck around a chair, fired shots against his head and body until he bled and choked to death.	Miro Barešić	
May 17	Kidnapping, Assassination	1	0	Ankara, Turkey	Assassination of Efraim Elrom: Efraim Elrom, the Israeli consul-general, was kidnapped and murdered by the People's Liberation Army of Turkey.	People's Liberation Army of Turkey	
June 8	Assassination	1	0	Santiago, Chile	The group Vanguardia Organizada del Pueblo, an ultra-left movement, whose members were formerly pardoned by President Salvador Allende, murdered former Interior Minister Edmundo Pérez Zujovic, in retaliation for the responsibility attributed to him by the so-called " Massacre of Port Mountt".	Vanguardia Organizada del Pueblo	
June 14	Bombing	10	20+	Krasnodar, Russia	1971 Krasnodar bus bombing: A homemade suitcase bomb placed near the gas tank by mentally ill Peter Volynsky exploded, killing 10 persons and wounding 20–90 others.	Peter Kuzmich Volynsky	
August 21	Bombing	9	95	Manila, Philippines	Plaza Miranda bombing: Bomb kills nine at a rally of the Liberal Party.		
November 2	Bombing	3	26	Belfast, United Kingdom	Red Lion Pub bombing - the Provisional IRA exploded a bomb inside a pub on the Shankill Road. The blast killed three Protestant civilians and around 30 other people were injured, some seriously. There was also a bombing in drapery shop at the same time right beside the pub which injured several more people.	Provisional IRA	The Troubles
November 20	China Airlines Flight 825	25	0	Penghu, Taiwan	A bomb on China Airlines Flight 825 exploded, killing all 25 people on board.	Unknown	
December 4	Bombing	15	17	Belfast, United Kingdom	McGurk's Bar bombing: The Protestant Ulster Volunteer Force bomb McGurk's bar in a Catholic neighbourhood, killing 15 and injuring 17.	Ulster Volunteer Force	The Troubles
December 11	Bombing	4	19	Belfast, United Kingdom	To retaliate for the McGurk's bar bombing, the Provisional IRA set off a bomb in front of a furniture showroom in the mainly Protestant Shankill Road area, killing 4 and injuring 19.	Provisional IRA	The Troubles

== See also ==
- List of terrorist incidents
