= Terrorism in Sudan =

Terrorism in Sudan has occurred in Sudan since the recent war. The Sudanese government, however, persists in fighting against terrorism in the country.

Sudan has made progress in shutting down terrorism inside its borders. Sudan’s terrorist connection is not new and the country has been on the United States list of state sponsors of terrorism since August 1993 and was taken off in 2020. Sudan has been under diplomatic sanctions by the United Nations since 1996.

Sudan is in a strategic position to export its Islamic revolution because of its borders with both Egypt and Libya and with six African countries, including Ethiopia, which has a large and impoverished Muslim population.

Terrorism was introduced to Sudan in the early 1990s when Osama Bin Ladin and his followers came to the country and built a training camp infrastructure as well as setting up a business and finance network.

== State-sponsored terrorism ==
Sudan was considered a state sponsor of terrorism by the US government from 1993 to 2020, and was targeted by United Nations sanctions in 1996 for its role in sheltering suspects of an attempted assassination of Hosni Mubarak, president of Egypt. Sudan has been suspected of harboring members of the militant organizations Al-Qaeda, Hezbollah, Hamas, the Palestinian Islamic Jihad, the Abu Nidal Organization, Jamaat Al-Islamiyya, and the Egyptian Islamic Jihad, as well as supporting insurgencies in Uganda, Tunisia, Kenya, Ethiopia, and Eritrea. Voice of America News reported that Sudan is suspected by US officials of allowing the Lord's Resistance Army to operate within its borders.

In December 1994, Eritrea broke diplomatic relations with Sudan after a long period of increasing tension between the two countries due to a series of cross-border incidents involving the Eritrean Islamic Jihad (EIJ). Although the attacks did not pose a threat to the stability of the Government of Eritrea (the infiltrators have generally been killed or captured by government forces), the Eritreans believe the National Islamic Front (NIF) in Khartoum supported, trained, and armed the insurgents. After many months of negotiations with the Sudanese to try to end the incursions, the Government of Eritrea concluded that the NIF did not intend to change its policy and broke relations. Subsequently, the Government of Eritrea hosted a conference of Sudanese opposition leaders in June 1995 in an effort to help the opposition unite and to provide a credible alternative to the present government in Khartoum. Eritrea resumed diplomatic relations with Sudan on December 10, 2005. Since then, Sudan has accused Eritrea, along with Chad, of supporting rebels. The undemarcated border with Sudan previously posed a problem for Eritrean external relations.

Sudan was accused of allowing members of Hamas to travel to and live in the country, as well as raise funds, though the presence of terrorists in Sudan has largely been a secondary concern in terms of Sudanese sponsorship of terror to the facilitation of material supplies to terrorist groups and the use of Sudan by Palestine-based terrorist organizations has declined in recent years. The Allied Democratic Forces, designated as a terrorist organization by Uganda, is said to be supported by Sudan and suspected of affiliation with widely designated terrorist group Al-Shabaab.

Osama Bin Laden and Al Qaeda are said to have been formerly based in Sudan during the early 1990s. The US and Israel have conducted operations against Sudanese targets affiliated with terrorist groups as recently as 2012.

Following the fall of Omar Al Bashir as the president of Sudan and the visit of the newly appointed Sudanese Prime Minister Abdalla Hamdok to Washington, the United States agreed to exchange ambassadors and said it would consider dropping Sudan from its list of countries of state sponsored terrorism.

On December 14, 2020, the United States officially removed Sudan from the list after it agreed to establish relations with Israel and pay $335m to US victims of terror attacks.

== Terrorist groups in Sudan ==
Various organizations, including Amnesty International and The European Sudanese Public Affairs Council, have accused the Sudan People's Liberation Army (SPLA)of using terrorist methods. In 2001, the SPLA attacked civilian oil targets, killing a significant number of civilians and aid workers, as well selling rockets to civilians.

In 2026, the United States designated the Sudanese Muslim Brotherhood as "a Specially Designated Global Terrorist and intends to designate the group as a Foreign Terrorist Organization." At the same time, the U.S. Department of the Treasury added the Al-Bara' ibn Malik Battalion to its Specially Designated Nationals list for counter terrorism. Both these groups strong align and overlap with the Sudanese Armed Forces; reports indicated that the great majority of soldiers in the army belong to the Muslim Brotherhood. Accordingly, the U.S. Treastury sanctioned the leader of the Sudanese Armed Forces, Abdel Fattah al-Burhan, for his role "Destabilizing Sudan and Undermining the Goal of a Democratic Transition."

== Training camps ==
Many of the terrorist groups have a number of training camps in the country. Sudan, being the third largest African country (after the secession of South Sudan in 2011) is a common place to hide a terrorist training center. Certain locations are known for training particular groups or people from certain countries. Camp al-Maokil near Shendi was for training Algerians and Tunisians. In early May 1990, some 60 Arabs from North Africa, France, and Belgium began to train in the Shambat district of Khartoum. In the al-Khalafiyya area north of Khartoum training took place for the Algerian Islamic Salvation Army and the Armed Islamic Group. In Akhil al-Awliya on the banks of the Blue Nile, south of Khartoum more than 500 Palestinians, Syrians and Jordanians were trained.

== List of terrorist incidents in Sudan ==
List of terrorist incidents in Sudan since 1970:

Year	Number of incidents	Deaths	Injuries
2016	173	182	213
2015	158	210	329
2014	157	546	320
2013	46	220	150
2012	40	60	95
2011	39	197	124
2010	32	101	175
2009	27	77	37
2008	37	231	29
2007	27	317	117
2006	29	517	157
2005	7	54	26
2004	5	37	18
2003	1	1	0
2002	13	511	23
2001	10	16	3
2000	9	35	186
1999	6	16	6
1998	2	4	29
1997	3	1	21
1996	10	40	10
1995	4	6	0
1994	6	17	23
1993	0	0	0
1992	8	13	1
1991	3	32	0
1990	2	0	0
1989	8	14	1
1988	9	58	28
1987	1	0	0
1986	6	8	1
1985	0	0	0
1984	5	305	10
1983	3	0	0
1982	3	0	0
1981	2	2	3
1980	0	0	0
1979	0	0	0
1978	0	0	0
1977	0	0	
1976	0	0	0
1975	0	0	0
1974	0	0	0
1973	1	3	0
1972	0	0	0
1971	0	0	0
1970	0	0	0
Total	892	3,831	2,135

== Sources ==
- sudantribune.com
- https://web.archive.org/web/20091004174556/http://www.sudan.net/news/press/postedr/43.shtml
