= Avenue Bar shooting =

Bar shooting in Northern Ireland, 1988

Coordinates: 54.597°N 5.930°W

- Part of the Troubles
- Location: Union Street, Belfast, Northern Ireland
- Date: 15 May 1988; 14:20 (GMT)
- Attack type: Mass shooting
- Weapon: vz. 58 assault rifles
- Deaths: 3 civilians
- Injuries: 6
- Perpetrator: Ulster Volunteer Force

The Avenue Bar shooting occurred on 15 May 1988 as the Ulster Volunteer Force launched a gun attack on the Avenue Bar on Union Street in the city centre of Belfast, Northern Ireland, killing three Catholic civilians and wounding six others. The bar was close to the Unity Flats complex and as a result was frequented mostly by Catholics.

== Background ==
In 1988, both the UVF and the UDA had stepped up their campaigns against the Nationalist community, in part due to receiving a large arms shipment of handguns and assault rifles from South Africa. On 15 January, the UVF shot dead Catholic civilian Billy Kane at his home in the New Lodge. The objective of the Avenue Bar attack was to kill a leading Republican from the Unity Flats.

=== Previous UVF attacks ===
The bar had already been targeted by the UVF on two separate occasions in the mid 70s. The first attack occurred on 1 November 1973, a car bomb detonated outside the bar killing a Catholic pensioner, Francis McNelis (65). The second attack occurred on 15 May 1976 (exactly 12 years to the day before the 1988 shooting) when a UVF unit threw a bomb into the bar, the following explosion killed two Catholic civilians and injured several others inside the bar. The two people killed in the attack were, Henry McMahon (39) & Francis Heaney (46).

== The shooting ==
The attack occurred at 2:20pm when the bar was crowded with patrons. Two gunmen walked into the pub after being admitted through an electronic security door. A witness said they at first seemed to be looking for someone, but then opened fire indiscriminately with automatic weapons. People threw glasses at the gunmen in an attempt to fight them off. The gunmen escaped in a car which had been hijacked 20 minutes earlier on the Shankill Road, and which was found abandoned at Carlow Street behind Shankill Leisure Centre shortly after the attack. The three victims were Stephen McGahan (27), from the New Lodge, Damien Devlin (24), from Andersonstown, and Paul McBride (27), from Ardoyne. The UVF almost managed to kill another leading Provisional IRA member from the Unity Flats who was drinking in the bar at the time of the attack.

== Aftermath ==
On 15 June 1988, a month after the killings at the bar, the Provisional Irish Republican Army (PIRA) shot dead a UVF commander, Robert "Squeak" Seymour, who the PIRA alleged had ordered the Avenue Bar attack. He was killed by the PIRA in an alley behind his video shop in Woodstock Road, east Belfast.

In January 1990, three self-confessed Ulster Volunteer Force volunteers were sentenced to life in prison for the parts they played in the Avenue Bar shooting along with the killing of another Catholic civilian on 15 January 1988 in Upper Meadow Street, Belfast. .

== See also ==
- Timeline of Ulster Volunteer Force actions
- Loughinisland massacre
