= Nikola Kavaja =

Serbian nationalist (1932–2008)

- Никола Каваја
- Born: 3 October 1933; Peć, Zeta Banovina, Kingdom of Yugoslavia
- Died: 10 November 2008 (aged 75); Belgrade, Serbia
- Occupations: Soldier, assassin, political activist
- Years active: 1954–1979
- Organization: Serbian Liberation Movement – Fatherland
- Known for: Assassination attempts on Josip Broz Tito; Terrorism; Airline hijacking

Nikola Kavaja (Serbian Cyrillic: Никола Каваја; 3 October 1932 – 10 November 2008) was a Serbian anti-communist dissident and terrorist. He became known as the "Tito Hunter", due to his repeated assassination attempts on Yugoslav President Josip Broz Tito. Kavaja served 18 years in prison in the United States for the hijacking of American Airlines Flight 293.

== Life ==
=== Origin and youth ===
Kavaja was born in 1932, in Peć, Zeta Banovina, Kingdom of Yugoslavia, to gendarmerie father Mitar Kavaja and mother Milja (née Čađenović). Mitar, as a member of the gendarmery, fought numerous times with kachaks (Albanian brigands). Nikola's paternal grandfather was a perjanik (personal guard) of King Nikola I of Montenegro.

He was brought up in Peć. In April 1941, Nazi Germany invaded and occupied Yugoslavia and his family was split up and sent to different prison camps in Albania. In 1944 he returned to Peć to find his family. By his own account, he killed someone for the first time in his life that year when he pushed a wounded German soldier into a well.

=== Military and intelligence career ===
Early in his life, Kavaja served in the Yugoslav Air Force (RV i PVO), a branch of the Yugoslav People's Army (JNA), studying at the Air Force Academy in Pančevo where he rose to the rank of second lieutenant. Later he grew disillusioned with the communist regime that controlled FPR Yugoslavia, and joined a secret anti-communist group. In June 1953, as part of his clandestine activities, he sabotaged gas tanks at the Sombor airport. He evaded arrest, and a man who was not involved in the explosion was tried and executed. When his commander in the secret group was arrested, he deserted the air force. He was arrested by Yugoslav authorities while attempting to cross the border into Austria; however, after serving four years of an 18 1/2-year prison sentence, Kavaja escaped and finally made it to Austria. There, he was detained by Austrian authorities and transferred to an American Army base. After seven months of investigation by American authorities who suspected him of ties to the KGB, Kavaja began to carry out missions for the CIA against Yugoslavia and the USSR, including "sabotage, spying, exposing double agents, assassinations." In the 1960s he was living in Paterson, New Jersey, making a living as a steel fabricator and good friends with famed criminal authority Vojislav Stanimirović and his son Pavle Stanimirović.

According to Kavaja, one of his major assignments from the CIA was to assassinate Josip Broz Tito, president of Yugoslavia. Tito traveled to Brazil and Kavaja followed, but the chance to kill the leader was foiled when Tito stayed indoors for his entire stay. Kavaja followed Tito from Brazil to Chile, Mexico, and the United States. Upon arrival in the United States, he and his companions had to be especially careful because he was wanted by the FBI, which did not always share sources with the CIA. Kavaja claimed that in 1971, he staked out Camp David (near Thurmont, Maryland), disguised as a Maryland State Trooper, in order to kill Tito, who was visiting United States President Richard Nixon. Once again, he was foiled when Tito stayed indoors.

=== Freedom for the Serbian Fatherland ===
Kavaja was a central figure in a group called the Serbian Homeland Liberation Movement (Serbian: Српски ослободилачки покрет Отаџбина, Latin abbr. SOPO). Kavaja claimed that this organization bombed the Yugoslav embassies in Washington, D.C. and Ottawa, Canada and consulates in New York City, Chicago, San Francisco, and Toronto.

1990s recruitment flyer by Kavaja

In 1978, Kavaja and SOPO companions numbering over one hundred (including Stojiljko Kajević) were arrested in New York City by U.S. law enforcement officials. He was convicted in May 1979 of the 1975 bombing of a Yugoslav diplomat's home in Chicago. Kavaja was released on $250,000 bail, and after visiting his family in New York City, on June 20, 1979, he hijacked an American Airlines 727 (Flight 293 from New York City to Chicago). He planned to demand Kajević's release and then fly to a destination of Kajević's choosing. When he realized that Kajević would not be released, he let the plane's passengers go, retaining only the pilot, co-pilot and flight engineer. In an odd twist, included in this group was his own lawyer Deyan Ranko Brashich that took the place of the hostages. David Lenevsky, who is the same attorney used by renowned Serbian-American crime lord Vojislav Stanimirović for the Vizcaya Heist case. He forced the crew to fly back from Chicago to JFK Airport in New York City. There, he transferred to a larger plane (a Boeing 707) and demanded to be taken to Johannesburg, South Africa. On the advice of his lawyer David Lenevsky he flew to Ireland, which he was told did not have an extradition agreement with the United States. Hoping for political asylum, Kavaja surrendered in Shannon, Ireland with attorney Deyan Ranko Brashich and Kavaja was returned to America to again face a criminal trial.

Kavaja was in prison from 1979 until being released in 1997 and was to have remained on parole until 2019. He violated his parole by returning to Yugoslavia; had he returned to the United States he would have been arrested and returned to prison.

Kavaja formed a military unit for the defense of Serbs in Kosovo. A training camp was established in Piva, Montenegro, where recruits undertook six months training. However his unit was never given permission to be used against the Kosovo Liberation Army.

Nikola Kavaja was arrested on April 1, 2003, during Operation Sablja following the assassination of Zoran Đinđić. Kavaja was soon released, however.

Filmmaker Milan Knežević made a documentary about Kavaja called Nikola Kavaja - lovac na Tita ("Nikola Kavaja - Tito's hunter"), which was shown at the 1994 Edinburgh Film Festival.

He was an associate of Boško Radonjić and Vojislav Stanimirović, and considered a ranking authority and inspiration by the Pink Panthers.

Kavaja died from a heart attack at his home in Belgrade on November 10, 2008, although it was speculated that he was poisoned.

== See also ==
- Aircraft hijacking
- Ušće Tower
