= Terrorism in Kyrgyzstan =

Terrorism in Kyrgyzstan has increased since the U.S. military invaded Afghanistan and overthrew the Taliban in 2001. The governments of Kyrgyzstan and Uzbekistan provided airbases for counter-terrorism operations. Southern Kyrgyzstan is increasingly sympathetic to terrorism and Islamic extremism.

== Ties between terrorist organizations ==
Hizb-ut-Tahrir is banned in Uzbekistan, Tajikistan, and Kyrgyzstan as a terrorist organization. The Kyrgyz government banned HuT after it declared a jihad against Kyrgyz police on 19 July 2006. Uzbek President Islam Karimov had twice called on the Kyrgyz government to shut down HuT activities in Kyrgyzstan before the government added it to their list of banned organizations. Kyrgyz and Uzbek government officials say there are ties between Hizb-ut-Tahrir, the Islamic Movement of Uzbekistan, and the Islamic extremist group Akromiya. Kazakh Prosecutor-General Rashid Tusupbekov asked the Astana City Court to ban HuT because of its terrorist activities on 16 March 2005. Press secretary Zhamkenuly said it is "very probable that Hizb ut-Tahrir has connections with the Taliban, Al-Qaeda, and other extremist groups. Therefore, under the Kazakh law banning extremism, we have every reason to outlaw Hizb ut-Tahrir's activities on Kazakh territory."

== Hizb ut-Tahrir ==
Omurzak Mamayusupov, the head of Kyrgyzstan's State Committee on Religious Affairs, said on 12 April 2006 that the spread Hizb ut-Tahrir's ideology is Central Asia's greatest religious problem.

Police raided a terrorist hideout in the south on 14 July 2006. Terrorists wounded one officer before five were killed. Oitalbek Osmonov, a spokesman for Kyrgyzstan's National Security Service, said the terrorists were members of the Islamic Movement of Uzbekistan and Hizb ut-Tahrir and had been involved in "several prominent terrorist attacks." Osmonov said they had plans for future attacks.

Kyrgyz police arrested a suspected leader of HuT on 17 January 2007 in Osh. The suspect possessed weapons, ammunition, and banned religious literature when police arrested him.
