= 1988 Oshakati bomb blast =

Terrorist incident in Namibia

The 1988 Oshakati bomb blast was a bombing in Oshakati, Ovamboland, South West Africa (now Oshana Region, Namibia) which killed 27 people and left 70 others injured on 19 February 1988. The target of the bombing was the Barclay's Bank in the town. The perpetrators were never identified or convicted. Both the South African police and South West Africa People's Organization (SWAPO), the major independence movement in Namibia, were blamed. At the time of the blast, both SWAPO and the South African authorities blamed each other for the bombing.

== Background ==
19 February, the day of the blast, was the traditional time when state employees were paid. At approximately noon, a car bomb exploded. Oshakati in the 1980s was a major hub for both the South African military as well as the Bantustan Ovamboland government.

== Commemorations ==
In the years since the bombing, the day has been marked by commemorations by many Namibians, including prominent religious leaders and politicians. They called for national reconciliation in honour of the victims.
