= City of Poros ship attack =

1988 terrorist attack in Greece

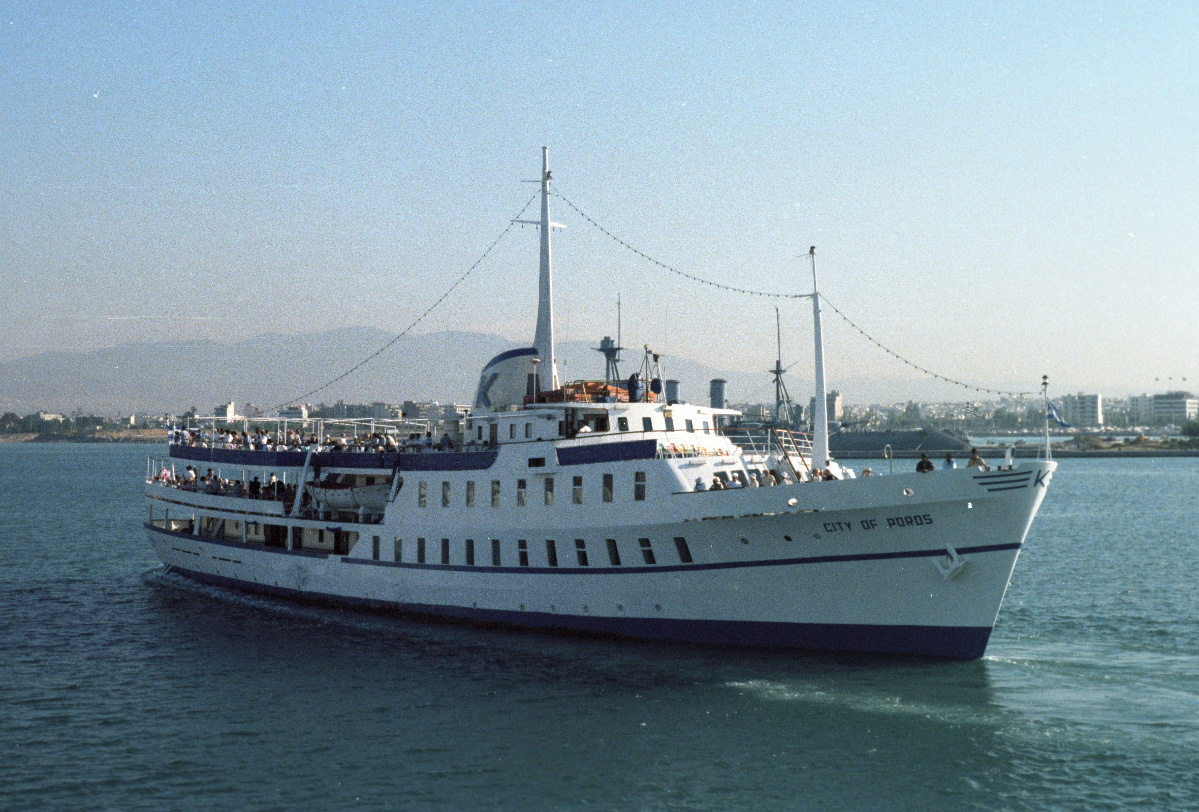
- The ship at Piraeus one month before the attack
- Location: off Athens, Greece
- Date: July 11, 1988; 18:48
- Target: Cruise ship City of Poros
- Attack type: Car bombing Attack by armed gunman
- Deaths: 11 total: 8 tourists on ship; 1 perpetrator on ship; 2 people in car bombing at pier
- Injuries: 98
- Perpetrator: Abu Nidal Organisation

The City of Poros was a Greek cruise ship that made day-cruises for Saronic Cruises to Hydra, Aegina and Poros from Flisvos Marina, a port in the Athens suburbs. The Saronic Cruises' ship was roughly 200 feet (60 m) long, and ran the regular 16 mile (26 km) trip between the two harbours every day, with a carrying capacity of 500 passengers. Four hours before the attack a car laden with explosives exploded on the pier prematurely, killing two Arab terrorists. On the evening of 11 July 1988, the ship was attacked by a Libyan-born Palestinian gunman who killed eight tourists before killing himself in a subsequent explosion. At the time of the attack, there were 471 people on board the ship.

== Pier explosion ==
Earlier on the day of the attack, the pier that the City of Poros usually berthed at in Piraeus was rocked by the detonation of a large car bomb. Due to the isolated location of the pier and the lack of tourists waiting on it (as the ship was at sea), the only fatalities were the two occupants of the vehicle, both of whom were killed instantly. The bomb's intended target was almost certainly the ship, but the plan of attack will never be known, due to the premature detonation. It is possible that the attack which followed was a "Plan B" after the failure of the car bomb.

== Attack ==
One gunman had boarded the ship as part of its normal intake of passengers at Aegina, and then had waited until the ship had left the port and was three miles into its journey before he attacked, at approximately 8:30 pm. Using concealed automatic weapons and hand grenades, he opened fire on his fellow passengers, who scattered in panic, many jumping overboard, which inadvertently caused many casualties amongst people who became caught in the ship's propellers. The perpetrator died in the attack.

The rescue operation was carried out by those unhurt on board the ship and by other ships which soon arrived upon the transmission of a distress signal from the City of Poros. Many of those in the water were rescued by these ships and taken to shore, where emergency services were waiting to transport the worst injuries to hospitals. A total of six bodies were found on the deck of the cruise ship, and another three people died in hospitals due to their injuries. This brought the total number of deaths to 11, including the two people who died in the car bomb explosion earlier in the day. In addition, 98 people were left injured, including 15 seriously. The dead on the ship were mostly tourists, including four from France and one each from Denmark, Sweden and Hungary, as well as two Greeks.

== Investigation ==
The subsequent investigation into the operation uncovered evidence which pointed at both the Abu Nidal Organisation (who claimed responsibility for both the bombing and the ferry attack), and their supposed sponsors, Libya. The weapons used in the attack were of Libyan origin, and at least one of the assailants entered Greece on a Libyan passport. There was also a strong motive for both the ANO and Libya. A case had been running in the Greek courts concerning the known ANO member Muhammed Rashid, who was fighting extradition to the United States for terrorist activities. The Greek justice Minister later arranged for his release and transport to Libya, which was at this time engaged in a terrorist campaign against Western Europe and the USA as part of their revenge for Operation El Dorado Canyon.

A year later, two ANO members were arrested and convicted of involvement in the attack, and further charges were later brought against a Lebanese man arrested in Germany, but the men who planned this operation mostly escaped official justice.

== See also ==
- Achille Lauro hijacking
- Black Sea hostage crisis
- Terrorism in Europe
