= Terrorism in Jamaica =

Terrorism in Jamaica is not a serious threat to the security of the state.

Despite this, terrorism has occurred in Jamaica's past, such as during the CanJet Flight 918 hijacking, in which a Jamaican gunman tried to take over a passenger plane heading from Jamaica to Cuba (where they would then proceed to Halifax).

== Reaction to the 11 September 2001 attacks ==
Prime Minister P. J. Patterson, Foreign Affairs Minister Paul Robertson, Ambassador to the United States Seymour Mullings, and The Jamaica Gleaner

The Jamaican government signed the International Convention for the Suppression of the Financing of Terrorism on 10 November 2001.

The Parliament of Jamaica passed the Terrorism Prevention Act on 8 April 2005 amid strong opposition from the minority Jamaica Labour Party and civic organizations.
