= American Airlines Flight 293 =

1979 aircraft hijacking

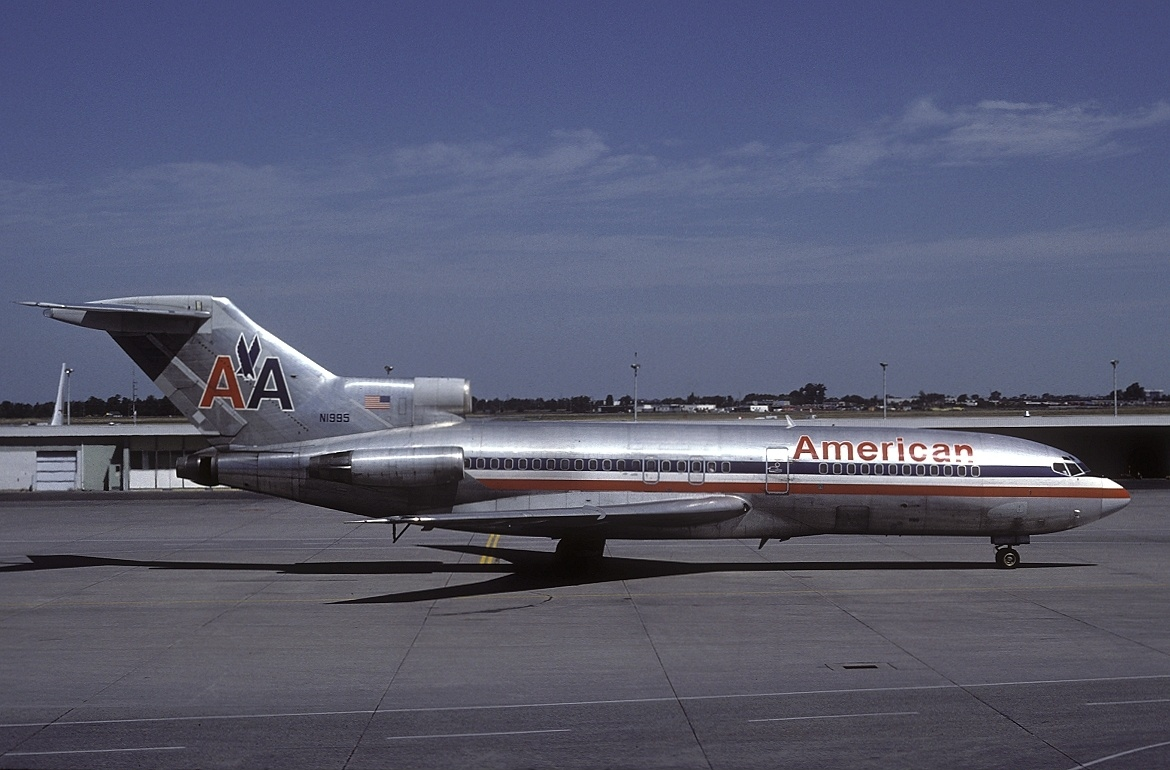
- N1995, the Boeing 727 involved

Hijacking
- Date: June 20, 1979
- Summary: Hijacking
- Site: United States

Aircraft
- Aircraft type: Boeing 727; Boeing 707
- Operator: American Airlines
- Call sign: AMERICAN 293
- Registration: N1995
- Flight origin: LaGuardia Airport, New York City
- 1st stopover: O'Hare International Airport, Chicago
- 2nd stopover: John F. Kennedy International Airport, New York City
- Last stopover: Shannon Airport, Ireland
- Destination: O'Hare International Airport, Chicago
- Passengers: 135 (1 hijacker)
- Fatalities: 0
- Survivors: All

American Airlines Flight 293 was a regularly scheduled flight from New York City (LaGuardia Airport) to Chicago (O'Hare International Airport). On June 20, 1979, the aircraft serving the flight was hijacked by Nikola Kavaja, a Serbian nationalist and anti-communist. During the hijacking Kavaja demanded and received another airplane which he intended to crash into the headquarters of the Yugoslav Communist Party in Belgrade. He was persuaded to surrender during a stop in Ireland.

== Background ==
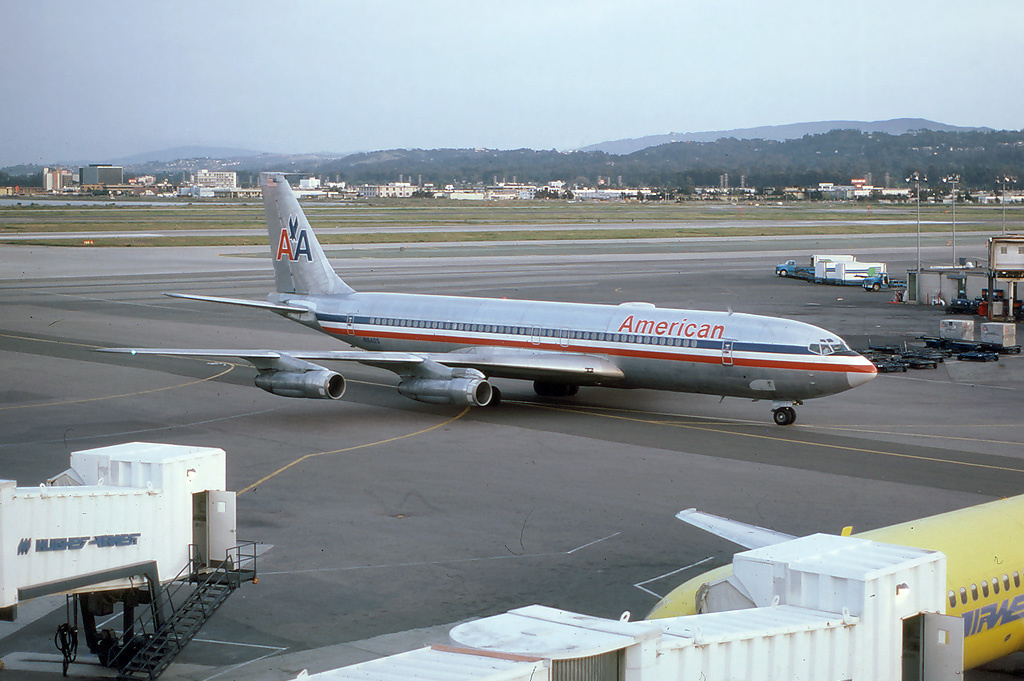
A Boeing 707, similar to the one involved

Nikola Kavaja was one of six Serbs convicted of the 1975 bombing of a Yugoslav consul's home in Chicago. On June 20, 1979, Kavaja, already released on bail, took over the Boeing 727 shortly before it landed in Chicago from New York by threatening the pilots with a homemade bomb. He demanded the release of Stojilko Kajevich, a Serbian Orthodox priest and accomplice in the consul home bombing who remained in jail. After letting the passengers and most of the crew members go, Kavaja forced what was left of the crew to fly back to New York City, where he demanded and received a Boeing 707 to fly him initially to Johannesburg, South Africa, but later to Ireland after learning from his lawyer that Ireland did not have an extradition treaty with the United States. After arriving at Shannon Airport he planned to take control of the airplane and fly it to Belgrade where he would crash it into the headquarters of the Yugoslav Communist Party; however, after being persuaded by his lawyer, who was also on board, to not do so, he surrendered to the Irish authorities, who then turned him over to the Americans. Kavaja was sentenced to 67 years in an American prison, but served only 20 years. Kavaja died from a heart attack at his home in Belgrade in November 2008.

Kavaja later claimed in numerous interviews with Serbian newspapers that Osama bin Laden stole his idea of crashing airplanes into tall buildings in the September 11, 2001, attacks.
