= Robert Seymour (loyalist) =

Northern Irish loyalist (c. 1955–1988)

- Born: c. 1955; Belfast, Northern Ireland
- Died: 15 June 1988 (aged 32–33); Woodstock Road, East Belfast
- Other names: "Squeak" "Bobby Blood"
- Occupation: Video shop proprietor
- Known for: Ulster Volunteer Force (UVF) East Belfast commander

Robert Seymour (c. 1955 – 15 June 1988) was a Northern Irish loyalist from Belfast who was a member of the Ulster Volunteer Force (UVF). He served as the paramilitary organisation's East Belfast commander before being shot dead by the Provisional IRA behind his video shop in that part of the city in June 1988. His killing was claimed to be in retaliation for a UVF gun attack on a nationalist pub in which three Catholics died.

In 1983, Seymour was convicted and sentenced to life imprisonment for the 1981 murder of leading IRA member James "Skipper" Burns. Seymour cycled to Burns' home in Rodney Parade, off the Donegall Road, and shot him as he lay sleeping beside his girlfriend. Seymour's conviction was overturned in the Appeal Court after the judge found the testimony of supergrass Joe Bennett "unbelievable".

Until 2011, Seymour's image featured on a large mural painted on a gable in Ballymacarrett Road, East Belfast.

== Ulster Volunteer Force ==
Robert Seymour was born around 1955. He was raised in a Protestant family in staunchly Ulster loyalist East Belfast. On an unknown date he joined the illegal UVF. He rose in the ranks of its Belfast Brigade, acquiring a reputation as a hitman, and eventually he became the East Belfast commander. The Los Angeles Times alleged that he was number three in the hierarchy of the UVF command. Never having married, Seymour was described by journalists Jim Cusack and Henry McDonald as having been a "quiet single man". He was known by the nicknames of "Squeak" and "Bobby Blood".

Late at night on 23 February 1981, he cycled across Belfast to the home of leading Provisional IRA member James "Skipper" Burns in Rodney Parade, Donegall Road, close to the Falls Road. After breaking into the house whilst Burns and his girlfriend were out, he waited downstairs until the couple returned and went to bed. Seymour then climbed the stairs and shot Burns dead as he lay sleeping beside his girlfriend, using a pistol with a silencer. Burns' girlfriend never woke during the attack and Seymour was able to leave the house undetected. However, as it had started to snow, Seymour, fearing that his bicycle would leave tracks which would ultimately lead the security forces back to him, carried the bicycle on his back along the Donegall Road and across the M1 motorway until he reached the loyalist Village area. This feat, along with the shooting of such a high-ranking IRA member in the Irish republican stronghold of west Belfast, made him a local legend and loyalist folk hero.

In 1983, Seymour and UVF battalion commander John Wilson were convicted of the murder and sentenced to life imprisonment on the evidence of supergrass Joe Bennett. Seymour was given a total of four life sentences. However, their convictions were overturned in the Appeal Court after the judge found Bennett's testimony to have been "unbelievable". According to Bennett, the UVF had targeted Burns because they believed he was Gerry Adams's second-in-command. Wilson had allegedly described the killing as a "good job well done" and then added "Gerry Adams will be next".

Seymour was later arrested and imprisoned for arms offences. He was released in 1987.

== Death ==
At approximately 12.45 p.m. on 15 June 1988, two masked Provisional IRA gunmen from the Markets and Ormeau Road areas entered the video shop owned by Seymour on the Woodstock Road in East Belfast. He made an attempt to escape by running out of the back door; however, he was cornered by the gunmen in an entry behind his shop and shot dead.

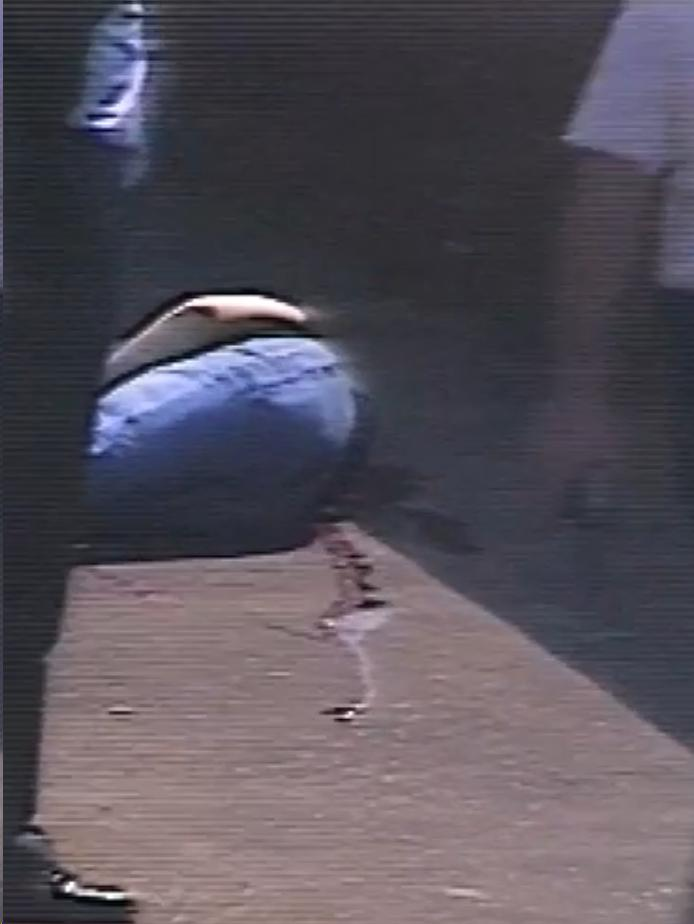
Seymour lying critically wounded after his shooting by the IRA in June 1988

The IRA claimed his killing was in retaliation for the shooting of an Irish nationalist pub in which three Catholics died.

At his funeral oration, Seymour was described as an "exemplary Volunteer". Part of it went as follows:

A young man who dedicated his life to his country has given all that any Soldier could give... At the going down of the sun and in the morning/We will remember them.

The UVF retaliated the following month by fatally shooting IRA volunteer Brendan "Ruby" Davison at his home in the Markets area of South Belfast on 25 July 1988 after receiving intelligence which revealed he had been Seymour's assassin. The UVF gunmen were wearing stolen Royal Ulster Constabulary (RUC) uniforms when they carried out the attack.

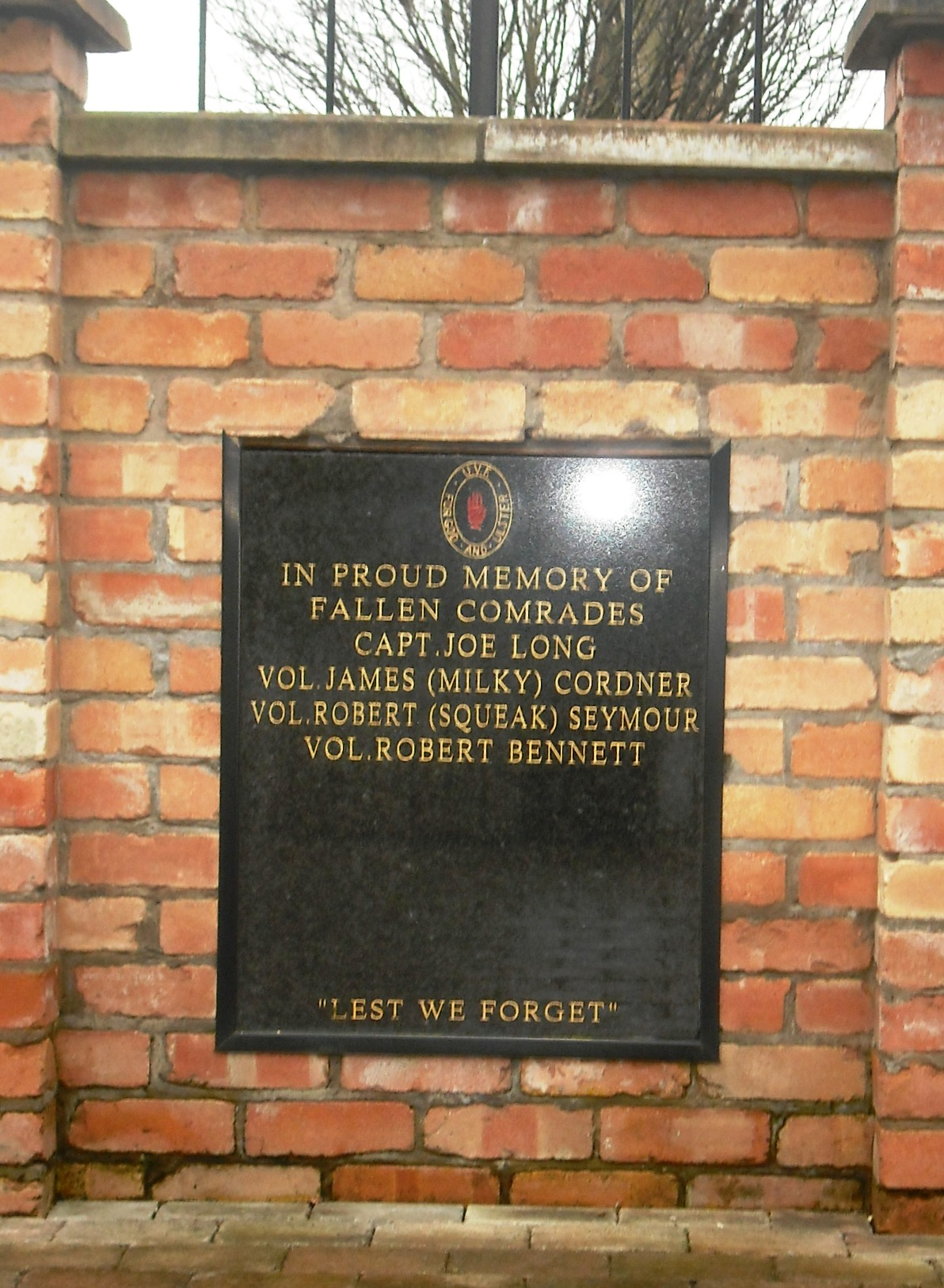
Memorial to Seymour and other local UVF members, Frazer Pass

Until 2011, Seymour's image featured alongside three other UVF members on an oversized gable mural. The mural stood for over 10 years at the junction of Ballymacarrett Road and Frazer Pass in east Belfast before being painted over. Seymour also features on the mural which replaced the original. In Frazer Pass there is a memorial plaque set inside a railed enclosure dedicated to Seymour, and he is also commemorated in loyalist ballads and videos.
