= Terrorism in South Africa =

Incidents of terrorist attacks

Terrorism in South Africa has not been seen as a significant threat to the security of the state since the end of apartheid.

In 1967 the government passed Terrorism Act No 83, defining terrorist activities as acts that "endanger the maintenance of law and order." In 2003, an Anti-Terrorism Bill (Bill 12 of 2003) was passed in which Terrorism was defined as "an unlawful act, committed in or outside the Republic."

In 2013, South Africa adopted a National Counter-Terrorism Strategy which is still in place in 2021. The document is aligned to the UN's Global Counter-Terrorism Strategy, takes cognisance of the relevant resolutions adopted by the UNSC, and is based on five pillars: 1) Understanding and Prediction; 2) Prevention; 3) Mitigation; 4) Combating; and 5) Response – Dealing with the Consequences. It is supported by an implementation plan – as well as time frames for implementation, assessment, and reassessment – and is updated annually.

The Parliament of the Republic of South Africa also passed the Protection of Constitutional Democracy Against Terrorist and Related Activities Act, 2004 (No. 33 of 2004) which " provide[s] for measures to prevent and combat terrorist and related activities; to provide for an offence of terrorism and other offences associated or connected with terrorist activities; to provide for Convention offences; to give effect to international instruments dealing with terrorist and related activities; to provide for a mechanism to comply with United Nations Security Council Resolutions, which are binding on member States, in respect of terrorist and related activities; to provide for measures to prevent and combat the financing of terrorist and related activities; to provide for investigative measures in respect of terrorist and related activities; and to provide for matters connected therewith." This Act is currently in the process of being amended.

== Pre-1994 incidents ==
uMkhonto weSizwe (MK), an anti-apartheid paramilitary group, carried out several bombings against civilians. These include:

- The Church Street, Pretoria bombing
- The Amanzimtoti bombing
- The Durban beach-front bombing

It also carried out a landmine campaign that killed several civilians.

The Azanian People's Liberation Army (APLA), an anti-apartheid paramilitary group, carried out attacks on white civilians, under the slogan of "One Settler, One Bullet". These include:

- The Saint James Church massacre
- The Heidelberg Tavern massacre

== Post-1994 incidents ==
=== Racial terrorism ===
Shortly after the 1994 democratic elections, white terrorist organizations started to appear and executed their plans with varying levels of success; some originated from 1980s and early 1990s groups that had unsuccessfully attempted to prevent the country's transformation to democracy.

On 30 October 2002, eight bombs exploded in Soweto, South Africa's largest township. Seven of the blasts destroyed commuter railway lines running through the township inconveniencing more than 200,000 commuters. The eighth blast occurred at a mosque, casing significant structural damage. An unknown, white supremacist movement, ‘Die Boeremag (Boer power), claimed responsibly for the attack. The incident gained national media attention and resulted in two dozen alleged Boeremag members, including serving military officers to be arrested and charged with terrorism related offences, sabotage and high treason. In total, 3000 kg of explosives were seized in the arrests.

The Afrikaner Weerstandsbeweging (Afrikaner Resistance Movement) founded in 1973 by noted white supremacist Eugene Terre' Blanche remains active currently, with the group boasting over 5,000 members. In 2010, members of the group were arrested for plans to attack black townships as well as foreign visitors and players travelling to the country for the 2010 FIFA World Cup.

In 2022, Pastor Harry Knoesen of Middelburg was found guilty of plotting to kill thousands of black South Africans and overthrow the government in order to “reclaim South Africa for white people.” Knoesen’s group, the National Christian Resistance Movement had planned to attack black communities by contaminating their water supply as well as targeting police and military installations. Knoesen admitted to sharing recipes for explosives on Facebook, where he also posted calls for violence against blacks.

=== Islamic terrorism ===
There have been numerous connections since the 11 September 2001 attacks between extremist organisation such as al-Qaeda and South Africa. Islamic fundamentalists have operated terrorist training camps within South Africa's borders. In 2007, the U.S Treasury department named two South African cousins as al Qaeda financiers and facilitators, ordering a freeze on U.S asset they may have and banning Americans from doing business with them. In 2013, several South African banks closed the Al-Aqsa Foundation's accounts following its U.S. Treasury designation as a "specially designated global terrorist group" for allegedly raising funds for Palestinian group Hamas.

In July 2016 South Africa's Directorate for Priority Crime Investigation arrested brothers Brandon-Lee and Tony-Lee Thulsie, who are South African citizens, on charges related to terrorism. It is alleged that after failed attempts to travel to Syria to join ISIS, the pair began planning attacks on US and Jewish targets in South Africa.

In 2019, South Africa's NPA continued to prosecute terrorism crimes. These included the previously reported prosecutions of the terrorist group allegedly responsible for the 2018 attacks on a Shia mosque and incendiary attacks against commercial interest in Durban, as well as of Sayefudeen Del Vecchio and Fatima Patel, who were charged in 2018 with the killing of British-South African dual nationals Rodney and Rachel Saunders.

== Cooperation with Senegal ==
Representatives from the governments of South Africa and Senegal signed an agreement outlining cooperation in the exchange of information on civil aviation, specifically covering responding to aviation terrorism, on 1 February 2007 in Pretoria.
