= List of statutory rules of Northern Ireland, 2000 =

This is an incomplete list of statutory rules of Northern Ireland in 2000.

== 1-100 ==
- Housing Benefit (General) (Amendment) Regulations (Northern Ireland) 2000 (S.R. 2000 No. 1)
- Social Security (Education Maintenance Allowance Amendment) Regulations (Northern Ireland) 2000 (S.R. 2000 No. 2)
- Social Security and Child Support (Decisions and Appeals) (Amendment) Regulations (Northern Ireland) 2000 (S.R. 2000 No. 3)
- Social Security (Incapacity for Work) (Miscellaneous Amendments) Regulations (Northern Ireland) 2000 (S.R. 2000 No. 4)
- Employment Relations (1999 Order) (Commencement No. 2 and Transitional Provision) Order (Northern Ireland) 2000 (S.R. 2000 No. 5)
- Employment Rights (Increase of Limits) Order (Northern Ireland) 2000 (S.R. 2000 No. 6)
- Working Time (Amendment) Regulations (Northern Ireland) 2000 (S.R. 2000 No. 7)
- Equal Opportunities (Employment Legislation) (Territorial Limits) Regulations (Northern Ireland) 2000 (S.R. 2000 No. 8)
- Jobseeker's Allowance (Amendment) Regulations (Northern Ireland) 2000 (S.R. 2000 No. 9)
- Rabies (Importation of Dogs, Cats and Other Mammals) (Amendment) Order (Northern Ireland) 2000 (S.R. 2000 No. 10)
- Local Government (Superannuation) (Amendment) Regulations (Northern Ireland) 2000 (S.R. 2000 No. 23)
- Plant Protection Products (Amendment) Regulations (Northern Ireland) 2000 (S.R. 2000 No. 24)
- Class Sizes in Primary Schools Regulations (Northern Ireland) 2000 (S.R. 2000 No. 27)
- Planning (Fees) (Amendment) Regulations (Northern Ireland) 2000 (S.R. 2000 No. 35)
- Guaranteed Minimum Pensions Increase Order (Northern Ireland) 2000 (S.R. 2000 No. 36)
- Jobseeker's Allowance (Amendment No. 2) Regulations (Northern Ireland) 2000 (S.R. 2000 No. 37)
- Social Security Benefits Up-rating Order (Northern Ireland) 2000 (S.R. 2000 No. 38)
- Inshore Fishing (Daily Close Time for Scallops) Regulations (Northern Ireland) 2000 (S.R. 2000 No. 39)
- Food Protection (Shellfish Emergency Prohibitions) (Revocation) Order (Northern Ireland) 2000 (S.R. 2000 No. 40)
- Rates (Regional Rates) Order (Northern Ireland) 2000 (S.R. 2000 No. 41)
- Rules of the Supreme Court (Northern Ireland) (Amendment) 2000 (S.R. 2000 No. 42)
- Local Government (Defined Activities) (Exemptions) Order (Northern Ireland) 2000 (S.R. 2000 No. 43)
- Registered Rents (Increase) Order (Northern Ireland) 2000 (S.R. 2000 No. 46)
- Social Security Benefits Up-rating Regulations (Northern Ireland) 2000 (S.R. 2000 No. 47)
- Social Security Benefits Up-rating and Miscellaneous Increases Regulations (Northern Ireland) 2000 (S.R. 2000 No. 48)
- Social Fund (Maternity and Funeral Expenses) (General) (Amendment) Regulations (Northern Ireland) 2000 (S.R. 2000 No. 49)
- Employment Rights (Increase of Limits) (No. 2) Order (Northern Ireland) 2000 (S.R. 2000 No. 50)
- Optical Charges and Payments and General Ophthalmic Services (Amendment) Regulations (Northern Ireland) 2000 (S.R. 2000 No. 51)
- Beet Seeds (Amendment) Regulations (Northern Ireland) 2000 (S.R. 2000 No. 52)
- Cereal Seeds (Amendment) Regulations (Northern Ireland) 2000 (S.R. 2000 No. 53)
- Fodder Plant Seeds (Amendment) Regulations (Northern Ireland) 2000 (S.R. 2000 No. 54)
- Oil and Fibre Plant Seeds (Amendment) Regulations (Northern Ireland) 2000 (S.R. 2000 No. 55)
- Vegetable Seeds (Amendment) Regulations (Northern Ireland) 2000 (S.R. 2000 No. 56)
- Charges for Drugs and Appliances (Amendment) Regulations (Northern Ireland) 2000 (S.R. 2000 No. 57)
- Dental Charges (Amendment) Regulations (Northern Ireland) 2000 (S.R. 2000 No. 58)
- Disabled Persons (Badges for Motor Vehicles) (Amendment) Regulations (Northern Ireland) 2000 (S.R. 2000 No. 59)
- Occupational and Personal Pension Schemes (Levy) (Amendment) Regulations (Northern Ireland) 2000 (S.R. 2000 No. 60)
- Assistance for Minor Works to Dwellings (Amendment) Regulations (Northern Ireland) 2000 (S.R. 2000 No. 61)
- Housing Renovation etc. Grants (Reduction of Grant) (Amendment) Regulations (Northern Ireland) 2000 (S.R. 2000 No. 62)
- Price Marking Order (Northern Ireland) 2000 (S.R. 2000 No. 63)
- Pensions Increase (Review) Order (Northern Ireland) 2000 (S.R. 2000 No. 64)
- Housing Benefit (General) (Amendment No. 2) Regulations (Northern Ireland) 2000 (S.R. 2000 No. 65)
- Welfare Reform and Pensions (1999 Order) (Commencement No. 2) Order (Northern Ireland) 2000 (S.R. 2000 No. 68)
- Occupational Pension Schemes (Miscellaneous Amendments) Regulations (Northern Ireland) 2000 (S.R. 2000 No. 69)
- Education and Libraries (Defined Activities) (Exemptions) (Amendment) Order (Northern Ireland) 2000 (S.R. 2000 No. 70)
- Social Security (Immigration and Asylum) Consequential Amendments Regulations (Northern Ireland) 2000 (S.R. 2000 No. 71)
- Food (Animal Products from Belgium) (Emergency Control) Order (Northern Ireland) 2000 (S.R. 2000 No. 72)
- Animal Feedingstuffs from Belgium (Control) Regulations (Northern Ireland) 2000 (S.R. 2000 No. 73)
- Social Security (Miscellaneous Amendments) Regulations (Northern Ireland) 2000 (S.R. 2000 No. 74)
- Workmen's Compensation (Supplementation) (Amendment) Regulations (Northern Ireland) 2000 (S.R. 2000 No. 75)
- Welfare of Animals (Slaughter or Killing) (Amendment) Regulations (Northern Ireland) 2000 (S.R. 2000 No. 76)
- Food Protection (Shellfish Emergency Prohibitions) (Revocation) (No. 2) Order (Northern Ireland) 2000 (S.R. 2000 No. 77)
- Food Standards Act 1999 (Transitional and Consequential Provisions and Savings) Regulations (Northern Ireland) 2000 (S.R. 2000 No. 78)
- Legal Aid (Financial Conditions) Regulations (Northern Ireland) 2000 (S.R. 2000 No. 79)
- Legal Advice and Assistance (Financial Conditions) Regulations (Northern Ireland) 2000 (S.R. 2000 No. 80)
- Legal Advice and Assistance (Amendment) Regulations (Northern Ireland) 2000 (S.R. 2000 No. 81)
- Food Protection (Shellfish Emergency Prohibitions) (Strangford Lough) (Amendment) Order (Northern Ireland) 2000 (S.R. 2000 No. 82)
- Dairy Produce Quotas (Amendment) Regulations (Northern Ireland) 2000 (S.R. 2000 No. 83)
- Environmental Impact Assessment (Forestry) Regulations (Northern Ireland) 2000 (S.R. 2000 No. 84)
- Electrical Equipment for Explosive Atmospheres (Certification) (Amendment) Regulations (Northern Ireland) 2000 (S.R. 2000 No. 85)
- Health and Safety at Work Order (Application to Environmentally Hazardous Substances) (Amendment) Regulations (Northern Ireland) 2000 (S.R. 2000 No. 86)
- Police (Health and Safety) Regulations (Northern Ireland) 2000 (S.R. 2000 No. 87)
- Social Fund Winter Fuel Payment Regulations (Northern Ireland) 2000 (S.R. 2000 No. 91)
- Control of Major Accident Hazards Regulations (Northern Ireland) 2000 (S.R. 2000 No. 93)
- Food Protection (Sheep Emergency Prohibitions) (Revocation) Order (Northern Ireland) 2000 (S.R. 2000 No. 94)
- Control of Asbestos at Work (Amendment) Regulations (Northern Ireland) 2000 (S.R. 2000 No. 98)
- Asbestos (Prohibitions) (Amendment) Regulations (Northern Ireland) 2000 (S.R. 2000 No. 99)
- Asbestos (Licensing) (Amendment) Regulations (Northern Ireland) 2000 (S.R. 2000 No. 100)

== 101-200 ==
- Planning (Control of Major-Accident Hazards) Regulations (Northern Ireland) 2000 (S.R. 2000 No. 101)
- Travelling Expenses and Remission of Charges (Amendment) Regulations (Northern Ireland) 2000 (S.R. 2000 No. 102)
- Income Support (General) (Standard Interest Rate Amendment) Regulations (Northern Ireland) 2000 (S.R. 2000 No. 103)
- Social Security (Maternity Allowance) (Earnings) Regulations (Northern Ireland) 2000 (S.R. 2000 No. 104)
- Social Security (Incapacity for Work) (Miscellaneous Amendments No. 2) Regulations (Northern Ireland) 2000 (S.R. 2000 No. 105)
- Social Security (Overlapping Benefits) (Amendment) Regulations (Northern Ireland) 2000 (S.R. 2000 No. 106)
- Occupational and Personal Pension Schemes (Penalties) Regulations (Northern Ireland) 2000 (S.R. 2000 No. 107)
- Potatoes Originating in Egypt (Amendment) Regulations (Northern Ireland) 2000 (S.R. 2000 No. 108)
- Social Security (Approved Work) Regulations (Northern Ireland) 2000 (S.R. 2000 No. 109)
- Poultry Breeding Flocks and Hatcheries Scheme (Amendment) Order (Northern Ireland) 2000 (S.R. 2000 No. 110)
- Planning (General Development) (Amendment) Order (Northern Ireland) 2000 (S.R. 2000 No. 113)
- Personal Social Services (Direct Payments) (Amendment) Regulations (Northern Ireland) 2000 (S.R. 2000 No. 114)
- Motor Vehicles (Driving Licences) (Amendment) Regulations (Northern Ireland) 2000 (S.R. 2000 No. 115)
- Rates (Amendment) (1998 Order) (Commencement No. 2) Order (Northern Ireland) 2000 (S.R. 2000 No. 116)
- Transport of Dangerous Goods (Safety Advisers) Regulations (Northern Ireland) 2000 (S.R. 2000 No. 119)
- Control of Substances Hazardous to Health Regulations (Northern Ireland) 2000 (S.R. 2000 No. 120)
- Education (Student Loans) (Repayment) Regulations (Northern Ireland) 2000 (S.R. 2000 No. 121)
- Employment Relations (1999 Order) (Commencement No. 3 and Transitional Provision) Order (Northern Ireland) 2000 (S.R. 2000 No. 122)
- Income-Related Benefits and Jobseeker's Allowance (Amendment) Regulations (Northern Ireland) 2000 (S.R. 2000 No. 125)
- Plant Health (Amendment No. 2) Order (Northern Ireland) 2000 (S.R. 2000 No. 126)
- Cereal Seeds (Amendment No. 2) Regulations (Northern Ireland) 2000 (S.R. 2000 No. 128)
- Motor Vehicles (Driving Licences) (Fees) (Amendment) Regulations (Northern Ireland) 2000 (S.R. 2000 No. 129)
- Motor Vehicles (Third-Party Risks) (Amendment) Regulations (Northern Ireland) 2000 (S.R. 2000 No. 131)
- Welfare Reform and Pensions (1999 Order) (Commencement No. 3) Order (Northern Ireland) 2000 (S.R. 2000 No. 133)
- Pneumoconiosis, etc., (Workers' Compensation) (Payment of Claims) (Amendment) Regulations (Northern Ireland) 2000 (S.R. 2000 No. 134)
- Social Security (National Insurance Number Information: Exemption) Regulations (Northern Ireland) 2000 (S.R. 2000 No. 135)
- Public Service Vehicles (Conditions of Fitness, Equipment and Use) (Amendment) Regulations (Northern Ireland) 2000 (S.R. 2000 No. 136)
- Seed Potatoes (Crop Fees) Regulations (Northern Ireland) 2000 (S.R. 2000 No. 138)
- Children (1995 Order) (Commencement No. 4) Order (Northern Ireland) 2000 (S.R. 2000 No. 139)
- Equality (Disability, etc.) (2000 Order) (Commencement No. 1) Order (Northern Ireland) 2000 (S.R. 2000 No. 140)
- Pensions on Divorce etc. (Provision of Information) Regulations (Northern Ireland) 2000 (S.R. 2000 No. 142)
- Pensions on Divorce etc. (Charging) Regulations (Northern Ireland) 2000 (S.R. 2000 No. 143)
- Pension Sharing (Valuation) Regulations (Northern Ireland) 2000 (S.R. 2000 No. 144)
- Pension Sharing (Implementation and Discharge of Liability) Regulations (Northern Ireland) 2000 (S.R. 2000 No. 145)
- Pension Sharing (Pension Credit Benefit) Regulations (Northern Ireland) 2000 (S.R. 2000 No. 146)
- Pension Sharing (Safeguarded Rights) Regulations (Northern Ireland) 2000 (S.R. 2000 No. 147)
- Motor Cars (Driving Instruction) (Fees) (Amendment) Regulations (Northern Ireland) 2000 (S.R. 2000 No. 148)
- Public Service Vehicles (Amendment) Regulations (Northern Ireland) 2000 (S.R. 2000 No. 149)
- Motor Vehicles (Driving Licences) (Amendment) (Test Fees) Regulations (Northern Ireland) 2000 (S.R. 2000 No. 150)
- Motor Vehicle Testing (Amendment) Regulations (Northern Ireland) 2000 (S.R. 2000 No. 151)
- Goods Vehicles (Testing) (Fees) (Amendment) Regulations (Northern Ireland) 2000 (S.R. 2000 No. 152)
- Razor Shells (Prohibition of Fishing) (Amendment) Regulations (Northern Ireland) 2000 (S.R. 2000 No. 157)
- Undersized Whiting (Revocation) Order (Northern Ireland) 2000 (S.R. 2000 No. 158)
- Local Government (General Grant) Order (Northern Ireland) 2000 (S.R. 2000 No. 160)
- Motor Cycles (Eye Protectors) Regulations (Northern Ireland) 2000 (S.R. 2000 No. 161)
- Land Registration (Amendment) Rules (Northern Ireland) 2000 (S.R. 2000 No. 165)
- Land Registry (Fees) Order (Northern Ireland) 2000 (S.R. 2000 No. 167)
- Census Order (Northern Ireland) 2000 (S.R. 2000 No. 168)
- Road Vehicles Lighting Regulations (Northern Ireland) 2000 (S.R. 2000 No. 169)
- Transport of Explosives (Safety Advisers) Regulations (Northern Ireland) 2000 (S.R. 2000 No. 171)
- Education (Student Support) (Amendment) Regulations (Northern Ireland) 2000 (S.R. 2000 No. 175)
- Local Government Pension Scheme Regulations (Northern Ireland) 2000 (S.R. 2000 No. 177)
- Local Government Pension Scheme (Management and Investment of Funds) Regulations (Northern Ireland) 2000 (S.R. 2000 No. 178)
- Inspection of Premises, Children and Records (Children Accommodated in Schools) Regulations (Northern Ireland) 2000 (S.R. 2000 No. 179)
- Social Security (Claims and Payments) (Amendment) Regulations (Northern Ireland) 2000 (S.R. 2000 No. 181)
- Welfare Reform and Pensions (1999 Order) (Commencement No. 4) Order (Northern Ireland) 2000 (S.R. 2000 No. 182)
- Social Security Revaluation of Earnings Factors Order (Northern Ireland) 2000 (S.R. 2000 No. 183)
- Horse Racing (Charges on Bookmakers) Order (Northern Ireland) 2000 (S.R. 2000 No. 184)
- Food (Animal Products from Belgium) (Emergency Control) (Revocation) Order (Northern Ireland) 2000 (S.R. 2000 No. 185)
- Tetrachloroethylene in Olive Oil (Revocation) Regulations (Northern Ireland) 2000 (S.R. 2000 No. 186)
- Medical Food Regulations (Northern Ireland) 2000 (S.R. 2000 No. 187)
- Colours in Food (Amendment) Regulations (Northern Ireland) 2000 (S.R. 2000 No. 188)
- Genetically Modified and Novel Foods (Labelling) Regulations (Northern Ireland) 2000 (S.R. 2000 No. 189)
- Food Protection (Shellfish Emergency Prohibitions) (Strangford Lough) (Revocation) Order (Northern Ireland) 2000 (S.R. 2000 No. 190)
- Meat (Enhanced Enforcement Powers) Regulations (Northern Ireland) 2000 (S.R. 2000 No. 191)
- Employment Rights (Time Off for Study or Training) (1998 Order) (Commencement) Order (Northern Ireland) 2000 (S.R. 2000 No. 192)
- Employment Rights (Time Off for Study or Training) Regulations (Northern Ireland) 2000 (S.R. 2000 No. 193)
- Ionising Radiation (Medical Exposure) Regulations (Northern Ireland) 2000 (S.R. 2000 No. 194)
- Social Security (Attendance Allowance and Disability Living Allowance) (Amendment) Regulations (Northern Ireland) 2000 (S.R. 2000 No. 195)
- Income Support (General) (Standard Interest Rate Amendment No. 2) Regulations (Northern Ireland) 2000 (S.R. 2000 No. 196)
- Jobseeker's Allowance (Amendment No. 3) Regulations (Northern Ireland) 2000 (S.R. 2000 No. 197)
- Census Regulations (Northern Ireland) 2000 (S.R. 2000 No. 198)
- Fair Employment (Specification of Public Authorities) Order (Northern Ireland) 2000 (S.R. 2000 No. 199)
- Crabs and Lobsters (Minimum Size) Order (Northern Ireland) 2000 (S.R. 2000 No. 200)

== 201-300 ==
- Motor Hackney Carriage (Newry) (Amendment) Bye-Laws (Northern Ireland) 2000 (S.R. 2000 No. 203)
- Welfare Reform and Pensions (1999 Order) (Commencement No. 5) Order (Northern Ireland) 2000 (S.R. 2000 No. 209)
- Divorce etc. (Pensions) Regulations (Northern Ireland) 2000 (S.R. 2000 No. 210)
- Criminal Evidence (1999 Order) (Commencement No. 1) Order (Northern Ireland) 2000 (S.R. 2000 No. 211)
- Legal Aid in Criminal Proceedings (Costs) (Amendment) Rules (Northern Ireland) 2000 (S.R. 2000 No. 212)
- Education (Student Support) Regulations (Northern Ireland) 2000 (S.R. 2000 No. 213)
- Social Security (Industrial Injuries) (Prescribed Diseases) (Amendment) Regulations (Northern Ireland) 2000 (S.R. 2000 No. 214)
- Social Security and Child Support (Miscellaneous Amendments) Regulations (Northern Ireland) 2000 (S.R. 2000 No. 215)
- Game Birds Preservation Order (Northern Ireland) 2000 (S.R. 2000 No. 216)
- General Medical Services (Amendment) Regulations (Northern Ireland) 2000 (S.R. 2000 No. 217)
- Criminal Evidence (1999 Order) (Commencement No. 2) Order (Northern Ireland) 2000 (S.R. 2000 No. 218)
- Part-time Workers (Prevention of Less Favourable Treatment) Regulations (Northern Ireland) 2000S.R. 2000 No. 219)
- Housing Benefit (General) (Amendment No. 3) Regulations (Northern Ireland) 2000 (S.R. 2000 No. 221)
- Income Support (General) and Jobseeker's Allowance (Amendment) Regulations (Northern Ireland) 2000 (S.R. 2000 No. 222)
- Anthrax (Amendment) Order (Northern Ireland) 2000 (S.R. 2000 No. 224)
- Anthrax (Vaccination) Scheme Order (Northern Ireland) 2000 (S.R. 2000 No. 225)
- Criminal Justice (Northern Ireland) Order 1996 (Extension of Group A Offences) Order 2000 (S.R. 2000 No. 226)
- Crown Court (Amendment) Rules (Northern Ireland) 2000 (S.R. 2000 No. 227)
- Fair Employment (Monitoring) (Amendment) Regulations (Northern Ireland) 2000 (S.R. 2000 No. 228)
- Environmental Protection (Disposal of Polychlorinated Biphenyls and other Dangerous Substances) Regulations (Northern Ireland) 2000 (S.R. 2000 No. 232)
- Animal Feedingstuffs from Belgium (Control) (Revocation) Regulations (Northern Ireland) 2000 (S.R. 2000 No. 233)
- Processed Cereal-based Foods and Baby Foods for Infants and Young Children (Amendment) Regulations (Northern Ireland) 2000 (S.R. 2000 No. 234)
- Infant Formula and Follow-on Formula (Amendment) Regulations (Northern Ireland) 2000 (S.R. 2000 No. 235)
- Industrial Training Levy (Construction Industry) Order (Northern Ireland) 2000 (S.R. 2000 No. 240)
- Social Security (Students Amendment) Regulations (Northern Ireland) 2000 (S.R. 2000 No. 241)
- Social Security (Students and Income-Related Benefits Amendment) Regulations (Northern Ireland) 2000 (S.R. 2000 No. 242)
- Rules of the Supreme Court (Northern Ireland) (Amendment No. 2) 2000 (S.R. 2000 No. 243)
- Education (Student Loans) (Amendment) Regulations (Northern Ireland) 2000 (S.R. 2000 No. 244)
- Social Security (Personal Allowances for Children Amendment) Regulations (Northern Ireland) 2000 (S.R. 2000 No. 245)
- Social Security (Contributions) (Republic of Korea) Order (Northern Ireland) 2000 (S.R. 2000 No. 246)
- Insolvency (Amendment) Rules (Northern Ireland) 2000 (S.R. 2000 No. 247)
- Foyle Area (Rivers Finn and Foyle Angling Permits) Regulations 2000 (S.R. 2000 No. 248)
- Housing Benefit (General) (Amendment No. 4) Regulations (Northern Ireland) 2000 (S.R. 2000 No. 249)
- Students Awards (Amendment) Regulations (Northern Ireland) 2000 (S.R. 2000 No. 250)
- Social Security (Therapeutic Earnings Limits) (Amendment) Regulations (Northern Ireland) 2000 (S.R. 2000 No. 251)
- Animals and Animal Products (Import and Export) Regulations (Northern Ireland) 2000 (S.R. 2000 No. 253)
- Education (Student Support) (2000 Regulations) (Amendment) Regulations (Northern Ireland) 2000 (S.R. 2000 No. 254)
- Jobseeker's Allowance (Amendment No. 4) Regulations (Northern Ireland) 2000 (S.R. 2000 No. 255)
- Social Fund (Winter Fuel Payment and Maternity and Funeral Expenses (General)) (Amendment) Regulations (Northern Ireland) 2000 (S.R. 2000 No. 259)
- Social Security (Bereavement Benefits Amendment) Regulations (Northern Ireland) 2000 (S.R. 2000 No. 260)
- Industrial Tribunals (Constitution and Rules of Procedure) (Amendment) Regulations (Northern Ireland) 2000 (S.R. 2000 No. 261)
- Stakeholder Pension Schemes Regulations (Northern Ireland) 2000 (S.R. 2000 No. 262)
- Social Security (Attendance Allowance and Disability Living Allowance) (Amendment No. 2) Regulations (Northern Ireland) 2000 (S.R. 2000 No. 263)
- Students Awards (Amendment No. 2) Regulations (Northern Ireland) 2000 (S.R. 2000 No. 264)
- Housing Benefit (General) (Amendment No. 5) Regulations (Northern Ireland) 2000 (S.R. 2000 No. 265)
- Social Security (Payments on account, Overpayments and Recovery) (Amendment) Regulations (Northern Ireland) 2000 (S.R. 2000 No. 266)
- Prison and Young Offenders Centre (Amendment) Rules (Northern Ireland) 2000 (S.R. 2000 No. 267)
- Housing Benefit (General) (Amendment No. 6) Regulations (Northern Ireland) 2000 (S.R. 2000 No. 268)
- Welfare of Farmed Animals Regulations (Northern Ireland) 2000 (S.R. 2000 No. 270)
- Magistrates' Courts (Human Rights Act 1998) Rules (Northern Ireland) 2000 (S.R. 2000 No. 278)
- Magistrates' Courts (Amendment) Rules (Northern Ireland) 2000 (S.R. 2000 No. 279)
- County Court (Amendment) Rules (Northern Ireland) 2000 (S.R. 2000 No. 282)
- Waterside, Coleraine Cycle/Pedestrian Bridge Order (Northern Ireland) 2000 (S.R. 2000 No. 283)
- Meat (Disease Control) Regulations (Northern Ireland) 2000 (S.R. 2000 No. 287)
- Salaries (Assembly Ombudsman and Commissioner for Complaints) Order (Northern Ireland) 2000 (S.R. 2000 No. 292)
- Transport of Animals and Poultry (Cleansing and Disinfection) Order (Northern Ireland) 2000 (S.R. 2000 No. 293)
- Specified Risk Material (Amendment) Regulations (Northern Ireland) 2000 (S.R. 2000 No. 295)
- Education (Student Support) (Amendment No. 2) Regulations (Northern Ireland) 2000 (S.R. 2000 No. 296)
- Motor Vehicles (Driving Licences) (Amendment No. 2) Regulations (Northern Ireland) 2000 (S.R. 2000 No. 297)
- Marketing of Potatoes (Amendment) Regulations (Northern Ireland) 2000 (S.R. 2000 No. 298)
- Seed Potatoes (Tuber and Label Fees) (Amendment) Regulations (Northern Ireland) 2000 (S.R. 2000 No. 299)
- Magistrates' Courts (Domestic Proceedings) (Amendment) Rules (Northern Ireland) 2000 (S.R. 2000 No. 300)

== 301-400 ==
- Sheep Annual Premium (Amendment) Regulations (Northern Ireland) 2000 (S.R. 2000 No. 301)
- Education (1998 Order) (Commencement No. 4) Order (Northern Ireland) 2000 (S.R. 2000 No. 302)
- Food Irradiation Provisions Regulations (Northern Ireland) 2000 (S.R. 2000 No. 303)
- Level Crossing (Antrim) Order (Northern Ireland) 2000 (S.R. 2000 No. 305)
- Level Crossing (Kingsmoss East)) Order (Northern Ireland) 2000 (S.R. 2000 No. 306)
- Level Crossing (Kingsmoss West) Order (Northern Ireland) 2000 (S.R. 2000 No. 307)
- Level Crossing (Ballymartin) Order (Northern Ireland) 2000 (S.R. 2000 No. 308)
- Level Crossing (Kilmakee) Order (Northern Ireland) 2000 (S.R. 2000 No. 309)
- Level Crossing (Kingsbog) Order (Northern Ireland) 2000 (S.R. 2000 No. 310)
- Students Awards Regulations (Northern Ireland) 2000 (S.R. 2000 No. 311)
- Compulsory Registration of Title Order (Northern Ireland) 2000 (S.R. 2000 No. 312)
- Police and Criminal Evidence (Application to Police Ombudsman) Order (Northern Ireland) 2000 (S.R. 2000 No. 314)
- Royal Ulster Constabulary (Conduct) Regulations 2000 (S.R. 2000 No. 315)
- Royal Ulster Constabulary (Unsatisfactory Performance) Regulations 2000 (S.R. 2000 No. 316)
- Royal Ulster Constabulary (Appeals) Regulations 2000 (S.R. 2000 No. 317)
- Royal Ulster Constabulary (Complaints etc.) Regulations 2000 (S.R. 2000 No. 318)
- Royal Ulster Constabulary (Complaints) (Informal Resolution) Regulations 2000 (S.R. 2000 No. 319)
- Royal Ulster Constabulary (Conduct) (Senior Officer) Regulations 2000 (S.R. 2000 No. 320)
- Social Fund Winter Fuel Payment (Amendment) Regulations (Northern Ireland) 2000 (S.R. 2000 No. 321)
- Disabled Persons (Badges for Motor Vehicles) (Amendment No. 2) Regulations (Northern Ireland) 2000 (S.R. 2000 No. 322)
- Statutory Maternity Pay (General) (Modification and Amendment) Regulations (Northern Ireland) 2000 (S.R. 2000 No. 324)
- Housing Renovation etc. Grants (Reduction of Grant) (Amendment No. 2) Regulations (Northern Ireland) 2000 (S.R. 2000 No. 325)
- Bus Permits (Designated Bodies) (Amendment) (Northern Ireland) Order 2000 (S.R. 2000 No. 327)
- Public Service Vehicles (Amendment No. 2) Regulations (Northern Ireland) 2000 (S.R. 2000 No. 328)
- Family Proceedings (Amendment) Rules (Northern Ireland) 2000 (S.R. 2000 No. 329)
- Motor Vehicles (Compulsory Insurance) Regulations (Northern Ireland) 2000 (S.R. 2000 No. 331)
- Welfare Reform and Pensions (1999 Order) (Commencement No. 6 and Transitional and Savings Provisions) Order (Northern Ireland) 2000 (S.R. 2000 No. 332)
- Rates Regulations (Northern Ireland) 2000 (S.R. 2000 No. 333)
- Flags (2000 Order) (Commencement) Order (Northern Ireland) 2000 (S.R. 2000 No. 334)
- Pension Sharing (Consequential and Miscellaneous Amendments) Regulations (Northern Ireland) 2000 (S.R. 2000 No. 335)
- Pension Sharing (Contracting-out) (Consequential Amendments) Regulations (Northern Ireland) 2000 (S.R. 2000 No. 336)
- Travelling Expenses and Remission of Charges (Amendment No. 2) Regulations (Northern Ireland) 2000 (S.R. 2000 No. 339)
- Social Fund Winter Fuel Payment (Temporary Increase) Regulations (Northern Ireland) 2000 (S.R. 2000 No. 340)
- Optical Charges and Payments (Amendment No. 2) Regulations (Northern Ireland) 2000 (S.R. 2000 No. 341)
- New Valuation List (Time and Class of Hereditaments) Order (Northern Ireland) 2000 (S.R. 2000 No. 342)
- Animals (Records) (Amendment) Order (Northern Ireland) 2000 (S.R. 2000 No. 344)
- Common Agricultural Policy Support Schemes (Modulation) Regulations (Northern Ireland) 2000 (S.R. 2000 No. 346)
- Flags Regulations (Northern Ireland) 2000 (S.R. 2000 No. 347)
- Personal Pension Schemes (Payments by Employers) Regulations (Northern Ireland) 2000 (S.R. 2000 No. 349)
- Jobseeker's Allowance (Joint Claims) Regulations (Northern Ireland) 2000 (S.R. 2000 No. 350)
- Child Support, Pensions and Social Security (2000 Act) (Commencement No. 1) Order (Northern Ireland) 2000 (S.R. 2000 No. 358)
- Social Security (Contracting-out and Qualifying Earnings Factor and Revision of Relevant Pensions) Regulations (Northern Ireland) 2000 (S.R. 2000 No. 360)
- Child Benefit (General) (Amendment) Regulations (Northern Ireland) 2000 (S.R. 2000 No. 361)
- Sharing of State Scheme Rights (Provision of Information and Valuation) Regulations (Northern Ireland) 2000 (S.R. 2000 No. 362)
- Eel Fishing (Licence Duties) Regulations (Northern Ireland) 2000 (S.R. 2000 No. 363)
- Fisheries (Amendment No. 3) Byelaws (Northern Ireland) 2000 (S.R. 2000 No. 364)
- Social Security (Joint Claims: Consequential Amendments) Regulations (Northern Ireland) 2000 (S.R. 2000 No. 365)
- Social Security (Capital Limits and Earnings Disregards Amendment) Regulations (Northern Ireland) 2000 (S.R. 2000 No. 366)
- Social Security (Enhanced Disability Premium Amendment) Regulations (Northern Ireland) 2000 (S.R. 2000 No. 367)
- Occupational Pensions (Revaluation) Order (Northern Ireland) 2000 (S.R. 2000 No. 368)
- Social Security (New Deal Pilot) Regulations (Northern Ireland) 2000 (S.R. 2000 No. 369)
- Fair Employment (Specification of Public Authorities) (No. 2) Order (Northern Ireland) 2000 (S.R. 2000 No. 371)
- Employment Relations (1999 Order) (Commencement No. 4 and Transitional Provisions) Order (Northern Ireland) 2000 (S.R. 2000 No. 373)
- Child Support, Pensions and Social Security (2000 Act) (Commencement No. 2) Order (Northern Ireland) 2000 (S.R. 2000 No. 374)
- Ionising Radiations Regulations (Northern Ireland) 2000 (S.R. 2000 No. 375)
- Fire Services (Amendment) (1998 Order) (Commencement) Order (Northern Ireland) 2000 (S.R. 2000 No. 376)
- Social Security (Contributions) (Japan) Order (Northern Ireland) 2000 (S.R. 2000 No. 377)
- Individual Learning Accounts Regulations (Northern Ireland) 2000 (S.R. 2000 No. 379)
- Social Security (Disclosure of State Pension Information) Regulations (Northern Ireland) 2000 (S.R. 2000 No. 380)
- Occupational Pension Schemes (Republic of Ireland Schemes Exemption) Regulations (Northern Ireland) 2000 (S.R. 2000 No. 382)
- Education (Listed Bodies) Order (Northern Ireland) 2000 (S.R. 2000 No. 385)
- Northern Ireland Policing Board (Prescribed Period) Regulations 2000 (S.R. 2000 No. 386)
- Criminal Appeal (Amendment) (Northern Ireland) Rules 2000 (S.R. 2000 No. 387)
- Management of Health and Safety at Work Regulations (Northern Ireland) 2000 (S.R. 2000 No. 388)
- Building Regulations (Northern Ireland) 2000 (S.R. 2000 No. 389)
- Courses for Drink-Drive Offenders (Designation of Districts) Order (Northern Ireland) 2000 (S.R. 2000 No. 390)
- Superannuation (Equality Commission for Northern Ireland) Order (Northern Ireland) 2000 (S.R. 2000 No. 391)
- Superannuation (Northern Ireland Assembly Commission) Order (Northern Ireland) 2000 (S.R. 2000 No. 392)
- Rules of the Supreme Court (Northern Ireland) (Amendment No. 3) 2000 (S.R. 2000 No. 393)
- Courses for Drink-Drive Offenders (Experimental Period) (Extension) Order (Northern Ireland) 2000 (S.R. 2000 No. 395)
- Police (Northern Ireland) Act 1998 (Commencement) Order (Northern Ireland) 2000 (S.R. 2000 No. 399)

== 401-500 ==
- Plastic Materials and Articles in Contact with Food (Amendment) Regulations (Northern Ireland) 2000 (S.R. 2000 No. 402)
- Trunk Road T8 (Toome Bypass) Order (Northern Ireland) 2000 (S.R. 2000 No. 403)
- Social Security (Incapacity Benefit) (Miscellaneous Amendments) Regulations (Northern Ireland) 2000 (S.R. 2000 No. 404)
- Petshops Regulations (Northern Ireland) 2000 (S.R. 2000 No. 405)
- Child Support, Pensions and Social Security (2000 Act) (Commencement No. 3) Order (Northern Ireland) 2000 (S.R. 2000 No. 406)
- Social Security (Australia) Order (Northern Ireland) 2000 (S.R. 2000 No. 407)
- New Valuation List Order (Northern Ireland) 2000 (S.R. 2000 No. 408)
- Police (Northern Ireland) Act 2000 (Commencement) Order 2000 (S.R. 2000 No. 412)
