= List of statutory rules of Northern Ireland, 2002 =

This is an incomplete list of statutory rules of Northern Ireland in 2002.

== 1-100 ==
- Misuse of Drugs Regulations (Northern Ireland) 2002 (S.R. 2002 No. 1)
- General Dental Services (Amendment) Regulations (Northern Ireland) 2002 (S.R. 2002 No. 2)
- Optical Charges and Payments (Amendment) Regulations (Northern Ireland) 2002 (S.R. 2002 No. 5)
- Fisheries and Aquaculture Structures (Grants) Regulations (Northern Ireland) 2002 (S.R. 2002 No. 6)
- Potatoes Originating in Germany (Notification) Order (Northern Ireland) 2002 (S.R. 2002 No. 7)
- Motor Vehicles (Authorised Weight) (Amendment) Regulations (Northern Ireland) 2002 (S.R. 2002 No. 8)
- Street Works (Register, Notices, Directions and Designations) Regulations (Northern Ireland) 2002 (S.R. 2002 No. 10)
- Fisheries (Amendment) Byelaws (Northern Ireland) 2002 (S.R. 2002 No. 11)
- Magistrates' Courts (Detention and Forfeiture of Terrorist Cash) Rules (Northern Ireland) 2002 (S.R. 2002 No. 12)
- Social Fund (Maternity and Funeral Expenses) (General) (Amendment) Regulations (Northern Ireland) 2002 (S.R. 2002 No. 14)
- Rules of the Supreme Court (Northern Ireland) (Amendment) 2002 (S.R. 2002 No. 15)
- Income Support (General) (Standard Interest Rate Amendment) Regulations (Northern Ireland) 2002 (S.R. 2002 No. 16)
- Pesticides (Maximum Residue Levels in Crops, Food and Feeding Stuffs) Regulations (Northern Ireland) 2002 (S.R. 2002 No. 20)
- Plant Protection Products (Amendment) Regulations (Northern Ireland) 2002 (S.R. 2002 No. 21)
- Adoption (Intercountry Aspects) Act (Northern Ireland) 2001 (Commencement No. 2) Order (Northern Ireland) 2002 (S.R. 2002 No. 22)
- Police Emblems and Flags Regulations (Northern Ireland) 2002 (S.R. 2002 No. 23)
- Employment Rights (Increase of Limits) Order (Northern Ireland) 2002 (S.R. 2002 No. 24)
- Welfare Reform and Pensions (1999 Order) (Commencement No. 10) Order (Northern Ireland) 2002 (S.R. 2002 No. 25)
- Rates (Regional Rates) Order (Northern Ireland) 2002 (S.R. 2002 No. 26)
- Pesticides (Maximum Residue Levels in Crops, Food and Feeding Stuffs) (Amendment) Regulations (Northern Ireland) 2002 (S.R. 2002 No. 27)
- Sulphur Content of Liquid Fuels Regulations (Northern Ireland) 2002 (S.R. 2002 No. 28)
- Marketing of Quality Agricultural Products Grant Regulations (Northern Ireland) 2002 (S.R. 2002 No. 29)
- Agricultural Processing and Marketing Grant Regulations (Northern Ireland) 2002 (S.R. 2002 No. 30)
- Social Security (Attendance Allowance and Disability Living Allowance) (Amendment) Regulations (Northern Ireland) 2002 (S.R. 2002 No. 31)
- Food and Animal Feedingstuffs (Products of Animal Origin from China) (Control) Regulations (Northern Ireland) 2002 (S.R. 2002 No. 33)
- Carriage of Dangerous Goods (Amendment) Regulations (Northern Ireland) 2002 (S.R. 2002 No. 34)
- Notification of Marketing of Food for Particular Nutritional Uses Regulations (Northern Ireland) 2002 (S.R. 2002 No. 35)
- Weights and Measures (Prescribed Stamp) (Amendment) Regulations (Northern Ireland) 2002 (S.R. 2002 No. 36)
- Coroners (Practice and Procedure) (Amendment) Rules (Northern Ireland) 2002 (S.R. 2002 No. 37)
- Sweeteners in Food (Amendment) Regulations (Northern Ireland) 2002 (S.R. 2002 No. 39)
- Belfast Harbour Order (Northern Ireland) 2002 (S.R. 2002 No. 40)
- Londonderry Harbour Order (Northern Ireland) 2002 (S.R. 2002 No. 41)
- Warrenpoint Harbour Authority Order (Northern Ireland) 2002 (S.R. 2002 No. 42)
- Nurses, Midwives and Health Visitors (Professional Conduct) (Amendment) Rules 2002, Approval Order (Northern Ireland) 2002 (S.R. 2002 No. 43)
- Foot-and-Mouth Disease (Controlled Area) Order (Northern Ireland) 2002 (S.R. 2002 No. 44)
- Adoption (Intercountry Aspects) Act (Northern Ireland) 2001 (Commencement No. 3) Order (Northern Ireland) 2002 (S.R. 2002 No. 45)
- Travelling Expenses and Remission of Charges (Amendment) Regulations (Northern Ireland) 2002 (S.R. 2002 No. 46)
- Motor Vehicle Testing (Amendment) (Fees) Regulations (Northern Ireland) 2002 (S.R. 2002 No. 47)
- Goods Vehicles (Testing) (Fees) (Amendment) Regulations (Northern Ireland) 2002 (S.R. 2002 No. 48)
- Public Service Vehicles (Licence Fees) (Amendment) Regulations (Northern Ireland) 2002 (S.R. 2002 No. 49)
- Passenger and Goods Vehicles (Recording Equipment) (Fees) (Amendment) Regulations (Northern Ireland) 2002 (S.R. 2002 No. 50)
- Motor Vehicles (Driving Licences) (Amendment) (Test Fees) Regulations (Northern Ireland) 2002 (S.R. 2002 No. 51)
- Road Traffic (Health Services Charges) (Amendment) Regulations (Northern Ireland) 2002 (S.R. 2002 No. 52)
- Diseases of Fish (Control) (Amendment) Regulations (Northern Ireland) 2002 (S.R. 2002 No. 53)
- Registered Rents (Increase) Order (Northern Ireland) 2002 (S.R. 2002 No. 54)
- Domestic Energy Efficiency Grants Regulations (Northern Ireland) 2002 (S.R. 2002 No. 56)
- Social Security Pensions (Low Earnings Threshold) Order (Northern Ireland) 2002 (S.R. 2002 No. 57)
- Income Support (General) (Standard Interest Rate Amendment No. 2) Regulations (Northern Ireland) 2002 (S.R. 2002 No. 58)
- Social Security (Claims and Payments) (Amendment) Regulations (Northern Ireland) 2002 (S.R. 2002 No. 59)
- Legal Aid (Financial Conditions) Regulations (Northern Ireland) 2002 (S.R. 2002 No. 60)
- Legal Advice and Assistance (Financial Conditions) Regulations (Northern Ireland) 2002 (S.R. 2002 No. 61)
- Legal Advice and Assistance (Amendment) Regulations (Northern Ireland) 2002 (S.R. 2002 No. 62)
- Welfare Reform and Pensions (1999 Order) (Commencement No. 11) Order (Northern Ireland) 2002 (S.R. 2002 No. 63)
- Occupational Pension Schemes (Minimum Funding Requirement and Miscellaneous Amendments) Regulations (Northern Ireland) 2002 (S.R. 2002 No. 64)
- Health and Personal Social Services Act (Northern Ireland) 2001 (Fund-holding Practices) (Transfer of Assets, Rights and Liabilities and Transitional Provisions) Order (Northern Ireland) 2002 (S.R. 2002 No. 66)
- Social Security (Claims and Payments and Miscellaneous Amendments) Regulations (Northern Ireland) 2002 (S.R. 2002 No. 67)
- Child Support, Pensions and Social Security (2000 Act) (Commencement No. 7) Order (Northern Ireland) 2002 (S.R. 2002 No. 68)
- Health and Personal Social Services (Superannuation) (Amendment) Regulations (Northern Ireland) 2002 (S.R. 2002 No. 69)
- Units of Measurement Regulations (Northern Ireland) 2002 (S.R. 2002 No. 70)
- Weights and Measures (Metrication Amendments) Regulations (Northern Ireland) 2002 (S.R. 2002 No. 71)
- Less Favoured Area Compensatory Allowances Regulations (Northern Ireland) 2002 (S.R. 2002 No. 72)
- Health and Personal Social Services Act (Northern Ireland) 2001 (Commencement No. 3) Order (Northern Ireland) 2002 (S.R. 2002 No. 73)
- Occupational Pension Schemes (Winding Up Notices and Reports, etc.) Regulations (Northern Ireland) 2002 (S.R. 2002 No. 74)
- Social Security Fraud (2001 Act) (Commencement No. 2) Order (Northern Ireland) 2002 (S.R. 2002 No. 75)
- Police (Northern Ireland) Act 2000 (Policing Plan) Regulations 2002 (S.R. 2002 No. 76)
- Social Security (Loss of Benefit) Regulations (Northern Ireland) 2002 (S.R. 2002 No. 79)
- Social Security (Loss of Benefit) (Consequential Amendments) Regulations (Northern Ireland) 2002 (S.R. 2002 No. 80)
- Food (Star Anise from Third Countries) (Emergency Control) Order (Northern Ireland) 2002 (S.R. 2002 No. 82)
- Welfare Foods (Amendment) Regulations (Northern Ireland) 2002 (S.R. 2002 No. 83)
- Dental Charges (Amendment) Regulations (Northern Ireland) 2002 (S.R. 2002 No. 84)
- Optical Charges and Payments and General Ophthalmic Services (Amendment) Regulations (Northern Ireland) 2002 (S.R. 2002 No. 85)
- Social Security (Incapacity) (Miscellaneous Amendments) Regulations (Northern Ireland) 2002 (S.R. 2002 No. 86)
- Social Security (Guardian's Allowances) (Amendment) Regulations (Northern Ireland) 2002 (S.R. 2002 No. 87)
- Dairy Produce Quotas Regulations (Northern Ireland) 2002 (S.R. 2002 No. 88)
- Social Security Revaluation of Earnings Factors Order (Northern Ireland) 2002 (S.R. 2002 No. 89)
- Social Fund (Maternity and Funeral Expenses) (General) (Amendment No. 2) Regulations (Northern Ireland) 2002 (S.R. 2002 No. 90)
- Charges for Drugs and Appliances (Amendment) Regulations (Northern Ireland) 2002 (S.R. 2002 No. 91)
- Pharmaceutical Services and General Medical Services (Amendment) Regulations (Northern Ireland) 2002 (S.R. 2002 No. 92)
- Working Time (Amendment) Regulations (Northern Ireland) 2002 (S.R. 2002 No. 93)
- Air Quality Limit Values Regulations (Northern Ireland) 2002 (S.R. 2002 No. 94)
- Police Service of Northern Ireland Regulations 2002 (S.R. 2002 No. 95)
- Police Service of Northern Ireland Reserve (Full-time) (Appointment and Conditions of Service) Regulations 2002 (S.R. 2002 No. 96)
- Social Security (Disability Living Allowance) (Amendment) Regulations (Northern Ireland) 2002 (S.R. 2002 No. 97)
- Guaranteed Minimum Pensions Increase Order (Northern Ireland) 2002 (S.R. 2002 No. 98)
- Social Security Benefits Up-rating Order (Northern Ireland) 2002 (S.R. 2002 No. 99)
- Police Service of Northern Ireland Pensions Regulations 2002 (S.R. 2002 No. 100)

== 101-200 ==
- Police Service of Northern Ireland Reserve (Full-time) Pensions Regulations 2002 (S.R. 2002 No. 101)
- Pensions Increase (Review) Order (Northern Ireland) 2002 (S.R. 2002 No. 102)
- Social Security (Work-focused Interviews for Lone Parents Amendment) Regulations (Northern Ireland) 2002 (S.R. 2002 No. 105)
- Social Security (Hospital In-Patients) (Amendment) Regulations (Northern Ireland) 2002 (S.R. 2002 No. 106)
- Social Security (Industrial Injuries) (Dependency) (Permitted Earnings Limits) Order (Northern Ireland) 2002 (S.R. 2002 No. 107)
- Social Security Benefits Up-rating Regulations (Northern Ireland) 2002 (S.R. 2002 No. 108)
- Occupational and Personal Pension Schemes (Contracting-out) (Miscellaneous Amendments) Regulations (Northern Ireland) 2002 (S.R. 2002 No. 109)
- Maternity and Parental Leave etc. (Amendment) Regulations (Northern Ireland) 2002 (S.R. 2002 No. 110)
- Education (Student Support) (Amendment) Regulations (Northern Ireland) 2002 (S.R. 2002 No. 111)
- Students Awards (Amendment) Regulations (Northern Ireland) 2002 (S.R. 2002 No. 112)
- Health and Personal Social Services (Assessment of Resources) (Amendment) Regulations (Northern Ireland) 2002 (S.R. 2002 No. 113)
- Workmen's Compensation (Supplementation) (Amendment) Regulations (Northern Ireland) 2002 (S.R. 2002 No. 114)
- Local Government Pension Scheme (Amendment) Regulations (Northern Ireland) 2002 (S.R. 2002 No. 115)
- Road Service Licensing (Community Licences) Regulations (Northern Ireland) 2002 (S.R. 2002 No. 116)
- Nurses, Midwives and Health Visitors (Professional Conduct) (Amendment) (No. 2) Rules 2002, Approval Order (Northern Ireland) 2002 (S.R. 2002 No. 117)
- Child Support, Pensions and Social Security (2000 Act) (Commencement No. 8) Order (Northern Ireland) 2002 (S.R. 2002 No. 118)
- Declarations of Parentage (Allocation of Proceedings) Order (Northern Ireland) 2002 (S.R. 2002 No. 119)
- Labour Relations Agency Arbitration Scheme Order (Northern Ireland) 2002 (S.R. 2002 No. 120)
- Child Support (Great Britain Reciprocal Arrangements) (Amendment) Regulations (Northern Ireland) 2002 (S.R. 2002 No. 121)
- Plant Protection Products (Amendment) (No. 2) Regulations (Northern Ireland) 2002 (S.R. 2002 No. 125)
- Welfare Reform and Pensions (1999 Order) (Commencement No. 12) Order (Northern Ireland) 2002 (S.R. 2002 No. 126)
- Occupational and Personal Pension Schemes (Bankruptcy) Regulations (Northern Ireland) 2002 (S.R. 2002 No. 127)
- Social Security (Miscellaneous Amendments) Regulations (Northern Ireland) 2002 (S.R. 2002 No. 128)
- Health and Personal Social Services (Superannuation) (Additional Voluntary Contributions) (Amendment) Regulations (Northern Ireland) 2002 (S.R. 2002 No. 129)
- Game Preservation (Amendment) (2002 Act)[ (Commencement) Order (Northern Ireland) 2002 (S.R. 2002 No. 130)
- Personal Social Services (Preserved Rights) (2002 Act) (Commencement) Order (Northern Ireland) 2002 (S.R. 2002 No. 131)
- Social Security (Amendment) (Residential Care and Nursing Homes) Regulations (Northern Ireland) 2002 (S.R. 2002 No. 132)
- Pneumoconiosis, etc., (Workers' Compensation) (Payment of Claims) (Amendment) Regulations (Northern Ireland) 2002 (S.R. 2002 No. 133)
- Industrial Development (2002 Act) (Commencement) Order (Northern Ireland) 2002 (S.R. 2002 No. 134)
- Maternity and Parental Leave etc. (Amendment No. 2) Regulations (Northern Ireland) 2002 (S.R. 2002 No. 135)
- Personal Social Services (Preserved Rights) Regulations (Northern Ireland) 2002 (S.R. 2002 No. 136)
- Family Proceedings (Amendment) Rules (Northern Ireland) 2002 (S.R. 2002 No. 137)
- Family Law (2001 Act) (Commencement) Order (Northern Ireland) 2002 (S.R. 2002 No. 138)
- Food (Figs, Hazelnuts and Pistachios from Turkey) (Emergency Control) Regulations (Northern Ireland) 2002 (S.R. 2002 No. 140)
- Food (Jelly Confectionery) (Emergency Control) Regulations (Northern Ireland) 2002 (S.R. 2002 No. 141)
- Traffic Signs (Amendment) Regulations (Northern Ireland) 2002 (S.R. 2002 No. 143)
- Adoption of Children from Overseas Regulations (Northern Ireland) 2002 (S.R. 2002 No. 144)
- Police (Northern Ireland) Act 2000 (Commencement No. 4) Order 2002 (S.R. 2002 No. 146)
- Explosives (Fireworks) Regulations (Northern Ireland) 2002 (S.R. 2002 No. 147)
- Criminal Injuries Compensation (Northern Ireland) Order 2002 (Commencement No. 1) Order 2002 (S.R. 2002 No. 148)
- Blood Tests (Evidence of Paternity) (Amendment) Regulations (Northern Ireland) 2002 (S.R. 2002 No. 150)
- Milk Marketing Board (Residuary Functions) (Amendment) Regulations (Northern Ireland) 2002 (S.R. 2002 No. 151)
- Motor Vehicles (Third-Party Risks) (Amendment) Regulations (Northern Ireland) 2002 (S.R. 2002 No. 154)
- Magistrates' Courts (Declarations of Parentage) Rules (Northern Ireland) 2002 (S.R. 2002 No. 158)
- Magistrates' Courts (Civil Jurisdiction and Judgments Act 1982) (Amendment) Rules (Northern Ireland) 2002 (S.R. 2002 No. 159)
- Medicated Feedingstuffs (Amendment) Regulations (Northern Ireland) 2002 (S.R. 2002 No. 161)
- Feedingstuffs (Zootechnical Products) (Amendment) Regulations (Northern Ireland) 2002 (S.R. 2002 No. 162)
- Magistrates' Courts (Blood Tests) (Amendment) Rules (Northern Ireland) 2002 (S.R. 2002 No. 163)
- Social Security and Child Support (Miscellaneous Amendments) Regulations (Northern Ireland) 2002 (S.R. 2002 No. 164)
- Social Security Fraud (2001 Act) (Commencement No. 3) Order (Northern Ireland) 2002 (S.R. 2002 No. 165)
- Dundrod Circuit (Admission Charges) Regulations (Northern Ireland) 2002 (S.R. 2002 No. 167)
- Seed Potatoes (Crop Fees) Regulations (Northern Ireland) 2002 (S.R. 2002 No. 169)
- General Dental Services (Amendment No. 2) Regulations (Northern Ireland) 2002 (S.R. 2002 No. 171)
- Travelling Expenses and Remission of Charges (Amendment No. 2) Regulations (Northern Ireland) 2002 (S.R. 2002 No. 172)
- Police (Northern Ireland) Act 2000 (Designated Places of Detention) Order 2002 (S.R. 2002 No. 179)
- Health and Personal Social Services (2001 Act) (Commencement No. 4) Order (Northern Ireland) 2002 (S.R. 2002 No. 180)
- Health and Personal Social Services (Penalty Charge) Regulations (Northern Ireland) 2002 (S.R. 2002 No. 181)
- Local Government (General Grant) Order (Northern Ireland) 2002 (S.R. 2002 No. 182)
- Regulation of Investigatory Powers Act 2000 (Amendment) Order (Northern Ireland) 2002 (S.R. 2002 No. 183)
- Waste and Contaminated Land (1997 Order) (Commencement No. 6) Order (Northern Ireland) 2002 (S.R. 2002 No. 185)
- Social Security and Child Support (Decisions and Appeals) (Miscellaneous Amendments) Regulations (Northern Ireland) 2002 (S.R. 2002 No. 189)
- Planning (General Development) (Amendment) Order (Northern Ireland) 2002 (S.R. 2002 No. 195)
- Motor Vehicles (Construction and Use) (Amendment) Regulations (Northern Ireland) 2002 (S.R. 2002 No. 197)

== 201-300 ==
- Rules of the Supreme Court (Northern Ireland) (Amendment No. 2) 2002 (S.R. 2002 No. 202)
- Income Support (General) and Jobseeker's Allowance (Amendment) Regulations (Northern Ireland) 2002 (S.R. 2002 No. 203)
- Northern Ireland Criminal Injuries Compensation Scheme 2002 (Commencement No. 1) Order 2002 (S.R. 2002 No. 204)
- Criminal Injuries Compensation (Northern Ireland) Order 2002 (Commencement No. 2) Order 2002 (S.R. 2002 No. 205)
- Pharmaceutical Society of Northern Ireland (General) (Amendment) Regulations (Northern Ireland) 2002 (S.R. 2002 No. 206)
- Animal By-Products Order (Northern Ireland) 2002 (S.R. 2002 No. 209)
- Animal By-Products (Revocation) Regulations (Northern Ireland) 2002 (S.R. 2002 No. 210)
- Superannuation (Invest Northern Ireland) Order (Northern Ireland) 2002 (S.R. 2002 No. 211)
- Legal Advice and Assistance (Amendment No. 2) Regulations (Northern Ireland) 2002 (S.R. 2002 No. 212)
- General Medical Services (Amendment) Regulations (Northern Ireland) 2002 (S.R. 2002 No. 213)
- Employment Relations (1999 Order) (Commencement No. 5 and Transitional Provision) Order (Northern Ireland) 2002 (S.R. 2002 No. 214)
- Stakeholder Pension Schemes (Amendment) Regulations (Northern Ireland) 2002 (S.R. 2002 No. 216)
- Meat (Hazard Analysis and Critical Control Point) Regulations (Northern Ireland) 2002 (S.R. 2002 No. 217)
- Contaminants in Food Regulations (Northern Ireland) 2002 (S.R. 2002 No. 219)
- Optical Charges and Payments (Amendment No. 2) Regulations (Northern Ireland) 2002 (S.R. 2002 No. 221)
- Social Security (Students and Income-Related Benefits Amendment) Regulations (Northern Ireland) 2002 (S.R. 2002 No. 222)
- Insolvency (Northern Ireland) Order 1989 (Amendment) Regulations (Northern Ireland) 2002 (S.R. 2002 No. 223)
- Education (Student Support) Regulations (Northern Ireland) 2002 (S.R. 2002 No. 224)
- Transmissible Spongiform Encephalopathy Regulations (Northern Ireland) 2002 (S.R. 2002 No. 225)
- Food and Animal Feedingstuffs (Products of Animal Origin from China) (Emergency Control) Regulations (Northern Ireland) 2002 (S.R. 2002 No. 226)
- Ground Rents (Multiplier) Order (Northern Ireland) 2002 (S.R. 2002 No. 228)
- Land Registration (Amendment) Rules (Northern Ireland) 2002 (S.R. 2002 No. 229)
- Allowances to Members of the Assembly (Winding up Allowance) (Amendment) Order (Northern Ireland) 2002 (S.R. 2002 No. 230)
- Change of District Name (Lisburn Borough) Order (Northern Ireland) 2002 (S.R. 2002 No. 231)
- Jobseeker's Allowance (Joint Claims) (Amendment) Regulations (Northern Ireland) 2002 (S.R. 2002 No. 236)
- Social Security (Industrial Injuries) (Prescribed Diseases) (Amendment) Regulations (Northern Ireland) 2002 (S.R. 2002 No. 237)
- Animal By-Products (Identification) (Amendment) Regulations (Northern Ireland) 2002 (S.R. 2002 No. 238)
- Producer Responsibility Obligations (Packaging Waste) (Amendment) Regulations (Northern Ireland) 2002 (S.R. 2002 No. 239)
- County Court (Blood Tests) (Amendment) Rules (Northern Ireland) 2002 (S.R. 2002 No. 240)
- Education (Student Loans) (Amendment) Regulations (Northern Ireland) 2002 (S.R. 2002 No. 241)
- Births, Deaths and Marriages (Fees) (No. 2) Order (Northern Ireland) 2002 (S.R. 2002 No. 242)
- Social Security (Intercalating Students Amendment) Regulations (Northern Ireland) 2002 (S.R. 2002 No. 243)
- Fair Employment (Monitoring) (Amendment) Regulations (Northern Ireland) 2002 (S.R. 2002 No. 244)
- Industrial Training Levy (Construction Industry) Order (Northern Ireland) 2002 (S.R. 2002 No. 245)
- Potatoes Originating in Egypt (Amendment) Regulations (Northern Ireland) 2002 (S.R. 2002 No. 246)
- Child Support (Temporary Compensation Payment Scheme) (Modification and Amendment) Regulations (Northern Ireland) 2002 (S.R. 2002 No. 247)
- Controlled Waste Regulations (Northern Ireland) 2002 (S.R. 2002 No. 248)
- Environmental Impact Assessment (Forestry) (Amendment) Regulations (Northern Ireland) 2002 (S.R. 2002 No. 249)
- Pesticides (Maximum Residue Levels in Crops, Food and Feeding Stuffs) (Amendment) (No. 2) Regulations (Northern Ireland) 2002 (S.R. 2002 No. 250)
- Ground Rents (2001 Act) (Commencement No. 1) Order (Northern Ireland) 2002 (S.R. 2002 No. 251)
- Property (1997 Order) (Commencement No. 3) Order (Northern Ireland) 2002 (S.R. 2002 No. 252)
- Trustee (2001 Act) (Commencement) Order (Northern Ireland) 2002 (S.R. 2002 No. 253)
- Social Security (Claims and Payments) (Amendment No. 2) Regulations (Northern Ireland) 2002 (S.R. 2002 No. 254)
- County Court (Amendment) Rules (Northern Ireland) 2002 (S.R. 2002 No. 255)
- Motor Vehicles (Construction and Use) (Amendment No. 2) Regulations (Northern Ireland) 2002 (S.R. 2002 No. 256)
- Seeds (Fees) Regulations (Northern Ireland) 2002 (S.R. 2002 No. 257)
- Police Service of Northern Ireland (Recruitment of Police Support Staff) Regulations 2002 (S.R. 2002 No. 258)
- Welfare of Farmed Animals (Amendment) Regulations (Northern Ireland) 2002 (S.R. 2002 No. 259)
- Royal Ulster Constabulary GC Foundation Regulations 2002 (S.R. 2002 No. 260)
- Insolvency (Amendment) Rules (Northern Ireland) 2002 (S.R. 2002 No. 261)
- Contaminants in Food (Amendment) Regulations (Northern Ireland) 2002 (S.R. 2002 No. 262)
- Feeding Stuffs (Amendment) Regulations (Northern Ireland) 2002 (S.R. 2002 No. 263)
- Food for Particular Nutritional Uses (Addition of Substances for Specific Nutritional Purposes) Regulations (Northern Ireland) 2002 (S.R. 2002 No. 264)
- Students Awards Regulations (Northern Ireland) 2002 (S.R. 2002 No. 265)
- General Medical Services (Amendment No. 2) Regulations (Northern Ireland) 2002 (S.R. 2002 No. 266)
- Social Security (Personal Allowances for Children and Young Persons Amendment) Regulations (Northern Ireland) 2002 (S.R. 2002 No. 267)
- Stakeholder Pension Schemes (Amendment No. 2) Regulations (Northern Ireland) 2002 (S.R. 2002 No. 268)
- Plant Health (Phytophthora ramorum) Order (Northern Ireland) 2002 (S.R. 2002 No. 269)
- Social Security (Students and Income-Related Benefits Amendment No. 2) Regulations (Northern Ireland) 2002 (S.R. 2002 No. 270)
- Controlled Waste (Duty of Care) Regulations (Northern Ireland) 2002 (S.R. 2002 No. 271)
- Education (Grants for Disabled Postgraduate Students) (Amendment) Regulations (Northern Ireland) 2002 (S.R. 2002 No. 272)
- Plant Health (Amendment) Order (Northern Ireland) 2002 (S.R. 2002 No. 273)
- Fisheries (Amendment No. 2) Byelaws (Northern Ireland) 2002 (S.R. 2002 No. 274)
- Social Security (Employment Programme Amendment) Regulations (Northern Ireland) 2002 (S.R. 2002 No. 275)
- Social Security (Incapacity) (Miscellaneous Amendments No. 2) Regulations (Northern Ireland) 2002 (S.R. 2002 No. 276)
- Bovines and Bovine Products (Trade) (Amendment) Regulations (Northern Ireland) 2002 (S.R. 2002 No. 278)
- Occupational Pension Schemes (Member-nominated Trustees and Directors) (Amendment) Regulations (Northern Ireland) 2002 (S.R. 2002 No. 279)
- Housing Benefit (General) (Amendment) Regulations (Northern Ireland) 2002 (S.R. 2002 No. 280)
- Fire Services (Appointments and Promotion) (Amendment) Regulations (Northern Ireland) 2002 (S.R. 2002 No. 283)
- Social Fund (Miscellaneous Amendments) Regulations (Northern Ireland) 2002 (S.R. 2002 No. 284)
- Plant Health (Wood and Bark) (Amendment) Order (Northern Ireland) 2002 (S.R. 2002 No. 285)
- Part-time Workers (Prevention of Less Favourable Treatment) (Amendment) Regulations (Northern Ireland) 2002 (S.R. 2002 No. 286)
- Plant Protection Products (Amendment) (No. 3) Regulations (Northern Ireland) 2002 (S.R. 2002 No. 289)
- Gas Order 1996 (Amendment) Regulations (Northern Ireland) 2002 (S.R. 2002 No. 291)
- Regulation of Investigatory Powers (Prescription of Offices, Ranks and Positions) Order (Northern Ireland) 2002 (S.R. 2002 No. 292)
- Food (Peanuts from China) (Emergency Control) Regulations (Northern Ireland) 2002 (S.R. 2002 No. 293)
- Motor Vehicles (Construction and Use) (Amendment No. 3) Regulations (Northern Ireland) 2002 (S.R. 2002 No. 294)
- Social Security (Miscellaneous Amendments No. 2) Regulations (Northern Ireland) 2002 (S.R. 2002 No. 295)
- Animals and Animal Products (Import and Export) (Amendment) Regulations (Northern Ireland) 2002 (S.R. 2002 No. 296)
- Social Security (Claims and Payments) (Amendment No. 3) Regulations (Northern Ireland) 2002 (S.R. 2002 No. 297)
- Fixed-term Employees (Prevention of Less Favourable Treatment) Regulations (Northern Ireland) 2002 (S.R. 2002 No. 298)
- Social Security (Personal Injury Payments Amendment) Regulations (Northern Ireland) 2002 (S.R. 2002 No. 299)
- Batteries and Accumulators (Containing Dangerous Substances) (Amendment) Regulations (Northern Ireland) 2002 (S.R. 2002 No. 300)

== 301-400 ==
- Chemicals (Hazard Information and Packaging for Supply) Regulations (Northern Ireland) 2002 (S.R. 2002 No. 301)
- Biocidal Products (Amendment) Regulations (Northern Ireland) 2002 (S.R. 2002 No. 302)
- Control of Noise (Codes of Practice for Construction and Open Sites) Order (Northern Ireland) 2002 (S.R. 2002 No. 303)
- Welfare of Animals (Slaughter or Killing) (Amendment) Regulations (Northern Ireland) 2002 (S.R. 2002 No. 304)
- Food (Figs, Hazelnuts and Pistachios from Turkey) (Emergency Control No. 2) Regulations (Northern Ireland) 2002 (S.R. 2002 No. 307)
- Weights and Measures (Passing as Fit for Use for Trade and Adjustment Fees) Regulations (Northern Ireland) 2002 (S.R. 2002 No. 308)
- Measuring Instruments (EEC Requirements) (Verification Fees) Regulations (Northern Ireland) 2002 (S.R. 2002 No. 309)
- Route U134 Balloo Road, Bangor (Abandonment) Order (Northern Ireland) 2002 (S.R. 2002 No. 310)
- Health and Personal Social Services (2002 Act) (Commencement) Order (Northern Ireland) 2002 (S.R. 2002 No. 311)
- Isaac’s Court/Charles Street South. Belfast (Abandonment) Order (Northern Ireland) 2002 (S.R. 2002 No. 312)
- Old Road, Lisburn (Abandonment and Stopping-Up) Order (Northern Ireland) 2002 (S.R. 2002 No. 313)
- Hibernia Street, Holwood (Footway) (Abandonment) ( Ireland) 2002 (S.R. 2002 No. 314)
- Social Fund (Cold Weather Payments) (General) (Amendment) Regulations (Northern Ireland) 2002 (S.R. 2002 No. 315)
- Plastic Materials and Articles in Contact with Food (Amendment) Regulations (Northern Ireland) 2002 (S.R. 2002 No. 316)
- Employment Relations (1999 Order) (Commencement No. 6 and Transitional Provisions) Order (Northern Ireland) 2002 (S.R. 2002 No. 317)
- Cloghanramer Road, Newry (Abandonment) Order (Northern Ireland) 2002 (S.R. 2002 No. 318)
- Justice (Northern Ireland) Act 2002 (Commencement No. 1) Order 2002 (S.R. 2002 No. 319)
- Salaries (Assembly Ombudsman and Commissioner for Complaints) Order (Northern Ireland) 2002 (S.R. 2002 No. 320)
- Deregulation (Carer's Allowance) Order (Northern Ireland) 2002 (S.R. 2002 No. 321)
- Social Security (Carer Premium Amendment) Regulations (Northern Ireland) 2002 (S.R. 2002 No. 322)
- Social Security (Carer's Allowance) (Amendment) Regulations (Northern Ireland) 2002 (S.R. 2002 No. 323)
- Carnegie Street, etc., Lurgan (Stopping-Up) Order (Northern Ireland) 2002 (S.R. 2002 No. 324)
- Route U1361 Lakeview Road, Craigavon (Abandonment) Order (Northern Ireland) 2002 (S.R. 2002 No. 325)
- Route U345 Tullybryan Road, Ballygawley (Abandonment) Order (Northern Ireland) 2002 (S.R. 2002 No. 326)
- Social Security (Claims and Payments and Miscellaneous Amendments No. 2) Regulations (Northern Ireland) 2002 (S.R. 2002 No. 327)
- Motor Vehicles (Exchangeable Licences) (Amendment) Order (Northern Ireland) 2002 (S.R. 2002 No. 328)
- T1 Belfast-Bangor Trunk Road (Extension) Order (Northern Ireland) 2002 (S.R. 2002 No. 329)
- Trunk Roads T3 and T10 (Omagh Distributor Stage III) Order (Northern Ireland) 2002 (S.R. 2002 No. 330)
- Water Supply (Water Quality) Regulations (Northern Ireland) 2002 (S.R. 2002 No. 331)
- Income Support (General) and Jobseeker's Allowance (Amendment No. 2) Regulations (Northern Ireland) 2002 (S.R. 2002 No. 332)
- Parking Places on Roads (Disabled Persons’ Vehicles) (Amendment No. 2) Order (Northern Ireland) 2002 (S.R. 2002 No. 333)
- Insolvency (Northern Ireland) Order 1989 (Amendment No. 2) Regulations (Northern Ireland) 2002 (S.R. 2002 No. 334)
- Beef Special Premium (Amendment) Regulations (Northern Ireland) 2002 (S.R. 2002 No. 335)
- Route B72 Derry Road, Strabane (Abandonment and Stopping-Up) Order (Northern Ireland) 2002 (S.R. 2002 No. 336)
- Cycle Tracks (Ballynure) Order (Northern Ireland) 2002 (S.R. 2002 No. 337)
- Cycle Lane (Sydenham By-Pass, Belfast) Order (Northern Ireland) 2002 (S.R. 2002 No. 338)
- Food Protection (Emergency Prohibitions) Order (Northern Ireland) 2002 (S.R. 2002 No. 339)
- Products of Animal Origin (Third Country Imports) Regulations (Northern Ireland) 2002 (S.R. 2002 No. 340)
- Supreme Court Fees (Amendment) Order (Northern Ireland) 2002 (S.R. 2002 No. 341)
- County Court Fees (Amendment) Order (Northern Ireland) 2002 (S.R. 2002 No. 342)
- Magistrates' Courts Fees (Amendment) Order (Northern Ireland) 2002 (S.R. 2002 No. 343)
- Family Proceedings Fees (Amendment) Order (Northern Ireland) 2002 (S.R. 2002 No. 344)
- Code of Practice (Industrial Action Ballots and Notice to Employers) (Appointed Day) Order (Northern Ireland) 2002 (S.R. 2002 No. 345)
- Code of Practice (Redundancy Consultation and Procedures) (Appointed Day) Order (Northern Ireland) 2002 (S.R. 2002 No. 346)
- Code of Practice (Disciplinary and Grievance Procedures) (Appointed Day) Order (Northern Ireland) 2002 (S.R. 2002 No. 347)
- Route A34 Lisnaskea Road, Maguiresbridge (Abandonment) Order (Northern Ireland) 2002 (S.R. 2002 No. 348)
- Northern Ireland Social Care Council (Appointments and Procedure) (Amendment) Regulations (Northern Ireland) 2002 (S.R. 2002 No. 349)
- Children (Allocation of Proceedings) (Amendment) Order (Northern Ireland) 2002 (S.R. 2002 No. 350)
- Social Security (2002 Act) (Commencement No. 1) Order (Northern Ireland) 2002 (S.R. 2002 No. 351)
- Local Government Pension Scheme Regulations (Northern Ireland) 2002 (S.R. 2002 No. 352)
- Local Government Pension Scheme (Amendment No. 2 and Transitional Provisions) Regulations (Northern Ireland) 2002 (S.R. 2002 No. 353)
- Social Security, Statutory Maternity Pay and Statutory Sick Pay (Miscellaneous Amendments) Regulations (Northern Ireland) 2002 (S.R. 2002 No. 354)
- Maternity and Parental Leave etc. (Amendment No. 3) Regulations (Northern Ireland) 2002 (S.R. 2002 No. 355)
- Employment (2002 Order) (Commencement and Transitional and Saving Provisions) Order (Northern Ireland) 2002 (S.R. 2002 No. 356)
- Air Quality Limit Values (Amendment) Regulations (Northern Ireland) 2002 (S.R. 2002 No. 357)
- Social Security (2002 Act) (Commencement No. 2 and Transitional and Saving Provisions) Order (Northern Ireland) 2002 (S.R. 2002 No. 358)
- Social Security, Statutory Maternity Pay and Statutory Sick Pay (Miscellaneous Amendments No. 2) Regulations (Northern Ireland) 2002 (S.R. 2002 No. 359)
- Cycle Tracks (Bangor) Order (Northern Ireland) 2002 (S.R. 2002 No. 360)
- Traffic Weight Restriction (Ballybarnes Road, Newtownards) Order (Northern Ireland) 2002 (S.R. 2002 No. 361)
- Loading Bays on Roads (Amendment No. 2) Order (Northern Ireland) 2002 (S.R. 2002 No. 362)
- Social Security (Paternity and Adoption Amendment) Regulations (Northern Ireland) 2002 (S.R. 2002 No. 363)
- Electricity (Applications for Consent) (Fees) (Amendment) Regulations (Northern Ireland) 2002 (S.R. 2002 No. 364)
- Moore’s Lane, Lurgan (Stopping-Up) Order (Northern Ireland) 2002 (S.R. 2002 No. 365)
- State Pension Credit (2002 Act) (Commencement No. 1) Order (Northern Ireland) 2002 (S.R. 2002 No. 366)
- Fair Employment (Specification of Public Authorities) (Amendment) Order (Northern Ireland) 2002 (S.R. 2002 No. 367)
- Sheep Annual Premium (Amendment) Regulations (Northern Ireland) 2002 (S.R. 2002 No. 368)
- Occupational Pensions (Revaluation) Order (Northern Ireland) 2002 (S.R. 2002 No. 369)
- Food Protection (Emergency Prohibitions) (Revocation) Order (Northern Ireland) 2002 (S.R. 2002 No. 370)
- Fisheries (Amendment No. 3) Byelaws (Northern Ireland) 2002 (S.R. 2002 No. 371)
- Fisheries (Tagging and Logbook) (Amendment) Byelaws (Northern Ireland) 2002 (S.R. 2002 No. 372)
- Road Traffic (Health Services Charges) (Amendment No. 2) Regulations (Northern Ireland) 2002 (S.R. 2002 No. 373)
- Driving Licences (Community Driving Licence) Regulations (Northern Ireland) 2002 (S.R. 2002 No. 374)
- Motor Vehicles (Construction and Use) (Amendment No. 4) Regulations (Northern Ireland) 2002 (S.R. 2002 No. 375)
- Legal Aid in Criminal Proceedings (Costs) (Amendment) Rules (Northern Ireland) 2002 (S.R. 2002 No. 376)
- Paternity and Adoption Leave Regulations (Northern Ireland) 2002 (S.R. 2002 No. 377)
- Statutory Paternity Pay and Statutory Adoption Pay (General) Regulations (Northern Ireland) 2002 (S.R. 2002 No. 378)
- Statutory Paternity Pay and Statutory Adoption Pay (Administration) Regulations (Northern Ireland) 2002 (S.R. 2002 No. 379)
- Statutory Paternity Pay and Statutory Adoption Pay (Weekly Rates) Regulations (Northern Ireland) 2002 (S.R. 2002 No. 380)
- Statutory Paternity Pay and Statutory Adoption Pay (Health and Personal Social Services Employees) Regulations (Northern Ireland) 2002 (S.R. 2002 No. 381)
- Statutory Paternity Pay and Statutory Adoption Pay (Persons Abroad and Mariners) Regulations (Northern Ireland) 2002 (S.R. 2002 No. 382)
- Motor Vehicles (Driving Licences) (Amendment No. 2) Regulations (Northern Ireland) 2002 (S.R. 2002 No. 383)
- Public Service Vehicles (Conditions of Fitness, Equipment and Use) (Amendment) Regulations (Northern Ireland) 2002 (S.R. 2002 No. 384)
- Police (Recruitment) (Northern Ireland) (Amendment) Regulations 2002 (S.R. 2002 No. S.R. 2002 No. 385)
- Northern Ireland Practice and Education Council for Nursing and Midwifery (Appointments and Procedure) Regulations (Northern Ireland) 2002 (S.R. 2002 No. 386)
- Ballee Road East, Ballymena (Abandonment) Order (Northern Ireland) 2002 (S.R. 2002 No. 387)
- Jobseeker's Allowance (Amendment) Regulations (Northern Ireland) 2002 (S.R. 2002 No. 388)
- One-Way Traffic (Lisburn) (Amendment) Order (Northern Ireland) 2002 (S.R. 2002 No. 389)
- Cycle Tracks (Armagh) Order (Northern Ireland) 2002 (S.R. 2002 No. 390)
- Child Support Appeals (Jurisdiction of Courts) Order (Northern Ireland) 2002 (S.R. 2002 No. 391)
- Social Security Fraud (2001 Act) (Commencement No. 4) Order (Northern Ireland) 2002 (S.R. 2002 No. 392)
- Teachers' (Compensation for Redundancy and Premature Retirement) (Amendment) Regulations (Northern Ireland) 2002 (S.R. 2002 No. 393)
- Londonderry Port and Harbour (Variation of Pilotage Limits) Order (Northern Ireland) 2002 (S.R. 2002 No. 394)
- River Bann Navigation Order (Northern Ireland) 2002 (S.R. 2002 No. 395)
- Airports Byelaws (Designation) Order (Northern Ireland) 2002 (S.R. 2002 No. 396)
- Pharmaceutical Services and Charges for Drugs and Appliances (Amendment) Regulations (Northern Ireland) 2002 (S.R. 2002 No. 397)
- On-Street Parking (Amendment No. 3) Order (Northern Ireland) 2002 (S.R. 2002 No. 398)
- Off-Street Parking (Amendment No. 2) Order (Northern Ireland) 2002 (S.R. 2002 No. 399)
- Compulsory Registration of Title Order (Northern Ireland) 2002 (S.R. 2002 No. 400)

== 401-500 ==
- Compulsory Registration of Title (No. 2) Order (Northern Ireland) 2002 (S.R. 2002 No. 401)
- Route B80 Tempo Road, Ratoran (Abandonment) Order (Northern Ireland) 2002 (S.R. 2002 No. 402)
- Tax Credits (Appeals) Regulations (Northern Ireland) 2002 (S.R. 2002 No. 403)
- Forest Reproductive Material Regulations (Northern Ireland) 2002 (S.R. 2002 No. 404)
- Justice (Northern Ireland) Act 2002 (Commencement No. 2) Order 2002 (S.R. 2002 No. 405)
- Social Security Fraud (2001 Act) (Commencement No. 5) Order (Northern Ireland) 2002 (S.R. 2002 No. 406)
- Seeds (Fees) (No. 2) Regulations (Northern Ireland) 2002 (S.R. 2002 No. 407)
- Social Security Administration (Northern Ireland) Act 1992 (Amendment) Order (Northern Ireland) 2002 (S.R. 2002 No. 408)
- Rates (Making and Levying of Different Rates) Regulations (Northern Ireland) 2002 (S.R. 2002 No. 409)
- Occupational and Personal Pension Schemes (Disclosure of Information) (Amendment) Regulations (Northern Ireland) 2002 (S.R. 2002 No. 410)
- County Court (Amendment No. 2) Rules (Northern Ireland) 2002 (S.R. 2002 No. 412)
- Justice (Northern Ireland) Act 2002 (Amendment of section 46 (1)) Order 2002 (S.R. 2002 No. 414)
