= List of statutory rules of Northern Ireland, 2001 =

This is an incomplete list of statutory rules of Northern Ireland in 2001.

== 1-100 ==
- Specified Risk Material (Amendment) Order (Northern Ireland) 2001 (S.R. 2001 No. 1)
- General Dental Services (Amendment) Regulations (Northern Ireland) 2001 (S.R. 2001 No. 2)
- Road Traffic (Fixed Penalty) Order (Northern Ireland) 2001 (S.R. 2001 No. 3)
- Social Security (Capital Disregards Amendment) Regulations (Northern Ireland) 2001 (S.R. 2001 No. 4)
- Organic Farming Regulations (Northern Ireland) 2001 (S.R. 2001 No. 5)
- Equality Commission (Time Limits) Regulations (Northern Ireland) 2001 (S.R. 2001 No. 6)
- Equality Commission (Time Limits) Regulations (Northern Ireland) 2001 (S.R. 2001 No. 9)
- Child Support (Temporary Compensation Payment Scheme) Regulations (Northern Ireland) 2001 (S.R. 2001 No. 12)
- Stakeholder Pension Schemes (Amendment) Regulations (Northern Ireland) 2001 (S.R. 2001 No. 13)
- Child Support (Collection and Enforcement and Miscellaneous Amendments) Regulations (Northern Ireland) 2001 (S.R. 2001 No. 15)
- Child Support (Information, Evidence and Disclosure and Maintenance Arrangements and Jurisdiction) (Amendment) Regulations (Northern Ireland) 2001 (S.R. 2001 No. 16)
- Child Support (Maintenance Calculation Procedure) Regulations (Northern Ireland) 2001 (S.R. 2001 No. 17)
- Child Support (Maintenance Calculations and Special Cases) Regulations (Northern Ireland) 2001 (S.R. 2001 No. 18)
- Child Support (Transitional Provisions) Regulations (Northern Ireland) 2001 (S.R. 2001 No. 19)
- Child Support (Variations) Regulations (Northern Ireland) 2001 (S.R. 2001 No. 20)
- Child Support (Voluntary Payments) Regulations (Northern Ireland) 2001 (S.R. 2001 No. 21)
- Social Security (Claims and Payments) (Amendment) Regulations (Northern Ireland) 2001 (S.R. 2001 No. 22)
- Social Security and Child Support (Decisions and Appeals) (Amendment) Regulations (Northern Ireland) 2001 (S.R. 2001 No. 23)
- Child Support (Variations) (Modification of Statutory Provisions) Regulations (Northern Ireland) 2001 (S.R. 2001 No. 24)
- Social Security (Child Maintenance Premium and Miscellaneous Amendments) Regulations (Northern Ireland) 2001 (S.R. 2001 No. 25)
- Dairy Produce Quotas (Amendment) Regulations (Northern Ireland) 2001 (S.R. 2001 No. 27)
- Motor Vehicles (Construction and Use) (Amendment) Regulations (Northern Ireland) 2001 (S.R. 2001 No. 28)
- Child Support (Consequential Amendments and Transitional Provisions) Regulations (Northern Ireland) 2001 (S.R. 2001 No. 29)
- Potatoes Originating in Egypt (Amendment) Regulations (Northern Ireland) 2001 (S.R. 2001 No. 32)
- Child Support, Pensions and Social Security (2000 Act) (Commencement No. 4) Order (Northern Ireland) 2001 (S.R. 2001 No. 34)
- Northern Ireland Policing Board (Prescribed Period) Regulations 2001 (S.R. 2001 No. 35)
- Statutory Maternity Pay (General) and Statutory Sick Pay (General) (Amendment) Regulations (Northern Ireland) 2001 (S.R. 2001 No. 36)
- Industrial Tribunals (1996 Order) (Application of Conciliation Provisions) Order (Northern Ireland) 2001 (S.R. 2001 No. 37)
- Recognition and Derecognition Ballots (Qualified Persons) Order (Northern Ireland) 2001 (S.R. 2001 No. 38)
- Trade Union Recognition (Method of Collective Bargaining) Order (Northern Ireland) 2001 (S.R. 2001 No. 39)
- Waste and Contaminated Land (1997 Order) (Commencement No. 5) Order (Northern Ireland) 2001 (S.R. 2001 No. 40)
- Social Security Benefits Up-rating Order (Northern Ireland) 2001 (S.R. 2001 No. 41)
- Guaranteed Minimum Pensions Increase Order (Northern Ireland) 2001 (S.R. 2001 No. 42)
- Countryside Management Regulations (Northern Ireland) 2001 (S.R. 2001 No. 43)
- Coffee Extracts and Chicory Extracts Regulations (Northern Ireland) 2001 (S.R. 2001 No. 45)
- Miscellaneous Food Additives (Amendment) Regulations (Northern Ireland) 2001 (S.R. 2001 No. 46)
- Feeding Stuffs Regulations (Northern Ireland) 2001 (S.R. 2001 No. 47)
- Specified Risk Material (Amendment) Regulations (Northern Ireland) 2001 (S.R. 2001 No. 48)
- Additional Pension (First Appointed Year) Order (Northern Ireland) 2001 (S.R. 2001 No. 49)
- Social Fund (Recovery by Deductions from Benefits) (Amendment) Regulations (Northern Ireland) 2001 (S.R. 2001 No. 52)
- Employment Rights (Increase of Limits) Order (Northern Ireland) 2001 (S.R. 2001 No. 54)
- Rates (Regional Rates) Order (Northern Ireland) 2001 (S.R. 2001 No. 55)
- Jobseeker's Allowance (Joint Claims: Consequential Amendments) Regulations (Northern Ireland) 2001 (S.R. 2001 No. 56)
- Registered Rents (Increase) Order (Northern Ireland) 2001 (S.R. 2001 No. 57)
- Local Government Pension Scheme (Pension Sharing on Divorce) Regulations (Northern Ireland) 2001 (S.R. 2001 No. 61)
- Local Government Pension Scheme (Management and Investment of Funds) (Amendment) Regulations (Northern Ireland) 2001 (S.R. 2001 No. 62)
- Local Government Pension Scheme (Amendment) Regulations (Northern Ireland) 2001 (S.R. 2001 No. 63)
- Local Government Pension Scheme (Amendment No. 2) Regulations (Northern Ireland) 2001 (S.R. 2001 No. 64)
- Magistrates' Courts (Terrorism Act 2000) Rules (Northern Ireland) 2001 (S.R. 2001 No. 65)
- Welfare of Animals (Slaughter or Killing) (Amendment) Regulations (Northern Ireland) 2001 (S.R. 2001 No. 66)
- County Courts (Financial Limits) Order (Northern Ireland) 2001 (S.R. 2001 No. 67)
- Superannuation (Chief Executive to the Mental Health Commission) Order (Northern Ireland) 2001 (S.R. 2001 No. 69)
- Less Favoured Area Compensatory Allowances Regulations (Northern Ireland) 2001 (S.R. 2001 No. 71)
- Private Streets (Amendment) (1992 Order) (Commencement) Order (Northern Ireland) 2001 (S.R. 2001 No. 72)
- Private Streets (Construction) (Amendment) Regulations (Northern Ireland) 2001 (S.R. 2001 No. 73)
- Nurses, Midwives and Health Visitors (Professional Conduct) (Amendment) Rules 2001, Approval Order (Northern Ireland) 2001 (S.R. 2001 No. 76)
- Education (Student Support) (Amendment No. 3) Regulations (Northern Ireland) 2001 (S.R. 2001 No. 77)
- Social Security (Miscellaneous Amendments) Regulations (Northern Ireland) 2001 (S.R. 2001 No. 78)
- Housing Benefit (General) (Amendment) Regulations (Northern Ireland) 2001 (S.R. 2001 No. 79)
- Royal Ulster Constabulary Reserve (Full-time) (Appointment and Conditions of Service) (Amendment) Regulations 2001 (S.R. 2001 No. 80)
- Foot-and-Mouth Disease (Amendment) Order (Northern Ireland) 2001 (S.R. 2001 No. 82)
- Foot-and-Mouth Disease (Infected Area) Order (Northern Ireland) 2001 (S.R. 2001 No. 83)
- Rates (Regional Rates) (No. 2) Order (Northern Ireland) 2001 (S.R. 2001 No. 84)
- Food Safety (General Food Hygiene) (Amendment) Regulations (Northern Ireland) 2001 (S.R. 2001 No. 85)
- Social Security (Reciprocal Agreements) Order (Northern Ireland) 2001 (S.R. 2001 No. 86)
- Foot-and-Mouth Disease (Controlled Area) Order (Northern Ireland) 2001 (S.R. 2001 No. 87)
- Social Security (Credits and Incapacity Benefit) (Amendment) Regulations (Northern Ireland) 2001 (S.R. 2001 No. 88)
- General Dental Services (Amendment No. 2) Regulations (Northern Ireland) 2001 (S.R. 2001 No. 89)
- Pig Industry Restructuring (Capital Grant) Scheme (Northern Ireland) 2001 (S.R. 2001 No. 90)
- Pig Industry Restructuring (Non-Capital Grant) Scheme Order (Northern Ireland) 2001 (S.R. 2001 No. 91)
- Foot-and-Mouth Disease (Controlled Area) (No. 2) Order (Northern Ireland) 2001 (S.R. 2001 No. 93)
- Pensions Increase (Review) Order (Northern Ireland) 2001 (S.R. 2001 No. 94)
- Housing Benefit (Extended Payments) Regulations (Northern Ireland) 2001 (S.R. 2001 No. 99)
- Social Security Revaluation of Earnings Factors Order (Northern Ireland) 2001 (S.R. 2001 No. 100)

== 101-200 ==
- Historic Monuments (Class Consents) Order (Northern Ireland) 2001 (S.R. 2001 No. 101)
- Social Security (Crediting and Treatment of Contributions, and National Insurance Numbers) Regulations (Northern Ireland) 2001 (S.R. 2001 No. 102)
- Community Drivers' Hours (Foot-and-Mouth Disease) (Temporary Exception) Regulations (Northern Ireland) 2001 (S.R. 2001 No. 103)
- Travelling Expenses and Remission of Charges (Amendment) Regulations (Northern Ireland) 2001 (S.R. 2001 No. 104)
- Income Support (General) (Amendment) Regulations (Northern Ireland) 2001 (S.R. 2001 No. 105)
- Social Security Benefits Up-rating Regulations (Northern Ireland) 2001 (S.R. 2001 No. 106)
- Social Security (Industrial Injuries) (Dependency) (Permitted Earnings Limits) Order (Northern Ireland) 2001 (S.R. 2001 No. 107)
- Social Security (Benefits for Widows and Widowers) (Consequential Amendments) Regulations (Northern Ireland) 2001 (S.R. 2001 No. 108)
- Pensions Appeal Tribunals (Northern Ireland) (Amendment) Rules 2001 (S.R. 2001 No. 109)
- New Deal (Miscellaneous Provisions) Order (Northern Ireland) 2001 (S.R. 2001 No. 110)
- Legal Aid (Financial Conditions) Regulations (Northern Ireland) 2001 (S.R. 2001 No. 111)
- Legal Advice and Assistance (Financial Conditions) Regulations (Northern Ireland) 2001 (S.R. 2001 No. 112)
- Legal Advice and Assistance (Amendment No. 2) Regulations (Northern Ireland) 2001 (S.R. 2001 No. 113)
- Welfare Reform and Pensions (1999 Order) (Commencement No. 7 and Transitional Provisions) Order (Northern Ireland) 2001 (S.R. 2001 No. 114)
- Social Security (Hospital In-Patients) (Amendment) Regulations (Northern Ireland) 2001 (S.R. 2001 No. 115)
- Workmen's Compensation (Supplementation) (Amendment) Regulations (Northern Ireland) 2001 (S.R. 2001 No. 116)
- Social Security (Invalid Care Allowance) (Amendment) Regulations (Northern Ireland) 2001 (S.R. 2001 No. 117)
- Occupational and Personal Pension Schemes (Perpetuities and Contracting-out) (Amendment) Regulations (Northern Ireland) 2001 (S.R. 2001 No. 118)
- Stakeholder Pension Schemes (Amendment No. 2) Regulations (Northern Ireland) 2001 (S.R. 2001 No. 119)
- Social Security (Joint Claims Amendments) Regulations (Northern Ireland) 2001 (S.R. 2001 No. 120)
- Charges for Drugs and Appliances (Amendment) Regulations (Northern Ireland) 2001 (S.R. 2001 No. 123)
- Dental Charges (Amendment) Regulations (Northern Ireland) 2001 (S.R. 2001 No. 124)
- Road Traffic (Health Services Charges) Regulations (Northern Ireland) 2001 (S.R. 2001 No. 125)
- Extensification Payment Regulations (Northern Ireland) 2001 (S.R. 2001 No. 127)
- Health and Personal Social Services (2001 Act) (Commencement No. 1) Order (Northern Ireland) 2001 (S.R. 2001 No. 128)
- Milk and Milk Products (Pupils in Educational Establishments) Regulations (Northern Ireland) 2001 (S.R. 2001 No. 129)
- Police (Northern Ireland) Act 2000 (Commencement No. 2) Order 2001 (S.R. 2001 No. 132)
- Optical Charges and Payments (Amendment) Regulations (Northern Ireland) 2001 (S.R. 2001 No. 133)
- Social Security (Miscellaneous Amendments No. 2) Regulations (Northern Ireland) 2001 (S.R. 2001 No. 134)
- General Medical Services (Amendment) Regulations (Northern Ireland) 2001 (S.R. 2001 No. 135)
- Welfare Reform and Pensions (1999 Order) (Commencement No. 8) Order (Northern Ireland) 2001 (S.R. 2001 No. 137)
- Occupational Pension Schemes (Pensions Compensation Provisions) (Amendment) Regulations (Northern Ireland) 2001 (S.R. 2001 No. 138)
- Welfare Foods (Amendment) Regulations (Northern Ireland) 2001 (S.R. 2001 No. 139)
- Police (Recruitment) (Northern Ireland) Regulations 2001 (S.R. 2001 No. 140)
- Child Support, Pensions and Social Security (2000 Act) (Commencement No. 5) Order (Northern Ireland) 2001 (S.R. 2001 No. 141)
- Construction (Design and Management) (Amendment) Regulations (Northern Ireland) 2001 (S.R. 2001 No. 142)
- Lobster (Conservation of Stocks) (Revocation) Regulations (Northern Ireland) 2001 (S.R. 2001 No. 144)
- Assistance of Fish Farming Scheme (Revocation) Order (Northern Ireland) 2001 (S.R. 2001 No. 145)
- Motor Cycles (Eye Protectors) (Amendment) Regulations (Northern Ireland) 2001 (S.R. 2001 No. 146)
- Motor Cycles (Protective Headgear) (Amendment) Regulations (Northern Ireland) 2001 (S.R. 2001 No. 147)
- Social Security (Widow's Benefit and Retirement Pensions) (Amendment) Regulations (Northern Ireland) 2001 (S.R. 2001 No. 148)
- Teachers' Superannuation (Sharing of Pensions on Divorce or Annulment) Regulations (Northern Ireland) 2001 (S.R. 2001 No. 149)
- Social Security (Capital Disregards and Recovery of Benefits Amendment) Regulations (Northern Ireland) 2001 (S.R. 2001 No. 150)
- Social Security (New Deal Amendment) Regulations (Northern Ireland) 2001 (S.R. 2001 No. 151)
- Social Security (Work-focused Interviews for Lone Parents) Regulations (Northern Ireland) 2001 (S.R. 2001 No. 152)
- Companies (1986 Order) (Audit Exemption) (Amendment) Regulations (Northern Ireland) 2001 (S.R. 2001 No. 153)
- Community Drivers' Hours (Foot-and-Mouth Disease) (Temporary Exception) (No. 2) Regulations (Northern Ireland) 2001 (S.R. 2001 No. 154)
- Fresh Meat (Beef Controls) (Amendment) Regulations (Northern Ireland) 2001 (S.R. 2001 No. 155)
- Social Security (Incapacity Benefit) (Amendment) Regulations (Northern Ireland) 2001 (S.R. 2001 No. 156)
- Social Security (Capital Disregards Amendment No. 2) Regulations (Northern Ireland) 2001 (S.R. 2001 No. 157)
- Foyle Area and Carlingford Area (Angling) Regulations 2001 (S.R. 2001 No. 158)
- Foyle Area and Carlingford Area (Tagging and Logbook) Regulations 2001 (S.R. 2001 No. 159)
- Foyle Area and Carlingford Area (Close Seasons for Angling) Regulations 2001 (S.R. 2001 No. 160)
- Education (Student Loans) (Repayment) (Amendment) Regulations (Northern Ireland) 2001 (S.R. 2001 No. 162)
- Disability Discrimination Act 1995 (Commencement No. 7) Order (Northern Ireland) 2001 (S.R. 2001 No. 163)
- Street Trading (2001 Act) (Commencement) Order (Northern Ireland) 2001 (S.R. 2001 No. 164)
- Street Trading (Fixed Penalty) (Notice and Procedure) Regulations (Northern Ireland) 2001 (S.R. 2001 No. 165)
- Street Trading (Form of Licence) Regulations (Northern Ireland) 2001 (S.R. 2001 No. 166)
- General Medical Services (Amendment No. 2) Regulations (Northern Ireland) 2001 (S.R. 2001 No. 167)
- Chemicals (Hazard Information and Packaging for Supply) (Amendment) Regulations (Northern Ireland) 2001 (S.R. 2001 No. 168)
- Disability Discrimination (Taxis) (Carrying of Guide Dogs etc.) Regulations (Northern Ireland) 2001 (S.R. 2001 No. 169)
- Motor Vehicles (Approval) (Fees) Regulations (Northern Ireland) 2001 (S.R. 2001 No. 170)
- Road Vehicles Lighting (Amendment) Regulations (Northern Ireland) 2001 (S.R. 2001 No. 171)
- Motor Vehicles (Approval) Regulations (Northern Ireland) 2001 (S.R. 2001 No. 172)
- Motor Vehicles (Construction and Use) (Amendment No. 2) Regulations (Northern Ireland) 2001 (S.R. 2001 No. 173)
- Motor Vehicles (Type Approval) (Amendment) Regulations (Northern Ireland) 2001 (S.R. 2001 No. 174)
- Social Security (Claims and Information) Regulations (Northern Ireland) 2001 (S.R. 2001 No. 175)
- Social Security (Work-focused Interviews) Regulations (Northern Ireland) 2001 (S.R. 2001 No. 176)
- General Grant (Specified Bodies) Regulations (Northern Ireland) 2001 (S.R. 2001 No. 178)
- Housing Benefit (General) (Amendment No. 2) Regulations (Northern Ireland) 2001 (S.R. 2001 No. 179)
- Import and Export Restrictions (Foot-and-Mouth Disease) Regulations (Northern Ireland) 2001 (S.R. 2001 No. 183)
- RUC (Complaints etc.) Regulations 2001 (S.R. 2001 No. 184)
- Resident Magistrate, Justice of the Peace and Clerk of Petty Sessions (Costs) Regulations (Northern Ireland) 2001 (S.R. 2001 No. 185)
- Restriction on Pithing Regulations (Northern Ireland) 2001 (S.R. 2001 No. 186)
- Seed Potatoes Regulations (Northern Ireland) 2001 (S.R. 2001 No. 188)
- Specified Risk Material (Amendment) (No. 2) Regulations (Northern Ireland) 2001 (S.R. 2001 No. 196)
- Child Support (Miscellaneous Amendments) Regulations (Northern Ireland) 2001 (S.R. 2001 No. 197)
- Motor Hackney Carriages (Belfast) (Amendment) By-Laws (Northern Ireland) 2001 (S.R. 2001 No. 198)
- Slaughter Premium Regulations (Northern Ireland) 2001 (S.R. 2001 No. 199)

== 201-300 ==
- Non-automatic Weighing Instruments (Use for Trade) Regulations (Northern Ireland) 2001 (S.R. 2001 No. 202)
- Import and Export Restrictions (Foot-and-Mouth Disease) (No. 2) Regulations (Northern Ireland) 2001 (S.R. 2001 No. 204)
- Health and Personal Social Services (Assessment of Resources) (Amendment) Regulations (Northern Ireland) 2001 (S.R. 2001 No. 205)
- Code of Practice (Access to Workers during Recognition and Derecognition Ballots) (Appointed Day) Order (Northern Ireland) 2001 (S.R. 2001 No. 208)
- Feeding Stuffs (Sampling and Analysis) (Amendment) Regulations (Northern Ireland) 2001 (S.R. 2001 No. 209)
- Bovines and Bovine Products (Trade) (Amendment) Regulations (Northern Ireland) 2001 (S.R. 2001 No. 210)
- Smoke Control Areas (Exempted Fireplaces) (Amendment) Regulations (Northern Ireland) 2001 (S.R. 2001 No. 211)
- Foot-and-Mouth Disease (Controlled Area) (No. 3) Order (Northern Ireland) 2001 (S.R. 2001 No. 212)
- Housing Benefit (Decisions and Appeals) Regulations (Northern Ireland) 2001 (S.R. 2001 No. 213)
- Housing Benefit (Decisions and Appeals) (Transitional and Savings) Regulations (Northern Ireland) 2001 (S.R. 2001 No. 214)
- Housing Benefit (Decisions and Appeals and Discretionary Financial Assistance) (Consequential Amendments and Revocations) Regulations (Northern Ireland) 2001 (S.R. 2001 No. 215)
- Discretionary Financial Assistance Regulations (Northern Ireland) 2001 (S.R. 2001 No. 216)
- Medical Act 1983 (Approved Medical Practices and Conditions of Residence) and General Medical Services (Amendment No. 3) Regulations (Northern Ireland) 2001 (S.R. 2001 No. 217)
- General Medical Services (Miscellaneous Amendments) Regulations (Northern Ireland) 2001 (S.R. 2001 No. 218)
- Income Support (General) (Standard Interest Rate Amendment) Regulations (Northern Ireland) 2001 (S.R. 2001 No. 219)
- Pharmaceutical Services (Amendment) Regulations (Northern Ireland) 2001 (S.R. 2001 No. 222)
- Community Drivers' Hours (Foot-and-Mouth Disease) (Temporary Exception) (No. 2) (Amendment) Regulations (Northern Ireland) 2001 (S.R. 2001 No. 223)
- Planning (Fees) (Amendment) Regulations (Northern Ireland) 2001 (S.R. 2001 No. 225)
- Gelatine (Intra-Community Trade) Regulations (Northern Ireland) 2001 (S.R. 2001 No. 226)
- Income Support and Jobseeker's Allowance (Amounts for Persons in Residential Care and Nursing Homes) Regulations (Northern Ireland) 2001 (S.R. 2001 No. 227)
- Seed Potatoes (Crop Fees) Regulations (Northern Ireland) 2001 (S.R. 2001 No. 228)
- Departments (Transfer of Functions) Order (Northern Ireland) 2001 (S.R. 2001 No. 229)
- Education (Pupil Records) (Amendment) Regulations (Northern Ireland) 2001 (S.R. 2001 No. 236)
- Compulsory Registration of Title Order (Northern Ireland) 2001 (S.R. 2001 No. 237)
- Housing Benefit (General) (Amendment No. 3) Regulations (Northern Ireland) 2001 (S.R. 2001 No. 238)
- Import and Export Restrictions (Foot-and-Mouth Disease) (No. 2) (Revocation) Regulations (Northern Ireland) 2001 (S.R. 2001 No. 239)
- Motor Vehicles (Driving Licences) (Fees) (Amendment) Regulations (Northern Ireland) 2001 (S.R. 2001 No. 240)
- Motor Vehicles (Construction and Use) (Amendment No. 3) Regulations (Northern Ireland) 2001 (S.R. 2001 No. 241)
- Products of Animal Origin (Import and Export) (Amendment) Regulations (Northern Ireland) 2001 (S.R. 2001 No. 242)
- Public Service Vehicles (Licence Fees) (Amendment) Regulations (Northern Ireland) 2001 (S.R. 2001 No. 244)
- Motor Vehicles (Driving Licences) (Amendment) (Test Fees) Regulations (Northern Ireland) 2001 (S.R. 2001 No. 245)
- Motor Vehicle Testing (Amendment) (Fees) Regulations (Northern Ireland) 2001 (S.R. 2001 No. 246)
- Goods Vehicles (Testing) (Fees) (Amendment) Regulations (Northern Ireland) 2001 (S.R. 2001 No. 247)
- Rehabilitation of Offenders (Exceptions) (Amendment) Order (Northern Ireland) 2001 (S.R. 2001 No. 248)
- Child Support, Pensions and Social Security (2000 Act) (Commencement No. 6) Order (Northern Ireland) 2001 (S.R. 2001 No. 249)
- Criminal Appeal (Amendment) (Northern Ireland) Rules 2001 (S.R. 2001 No. 250)
- Legal Aid in Criminal Proceedings (Costs) (Amendment) Rules (Northern Ireland) 2001 (S.R. 2001 No. 251)
- Crown Court (Amendment) Rules (Northern Ireland) 2001 (S.R. 2001 No. 253)
- Rules of the Supreme Court (Northern Ireland) (Amendment) 2001 (S.R. 2001 No. 254)
- Social Security (Volunteers Amendment) Regulations (Northern Ireland) 2001 (S.R. 2001 No. 258)
- Housing Benefit (General) (Amendment No. 4) Regulations (Northern Ireland) 2001 (S.R. 2001 No. 259)
- Social Security (1998 Order) (Commencement No. 12) Order (Northern Ireland) 2001 (S.R. 2001 No. 260)
- Social Security (Discretionary Housing Payments Amendment) Regulations (Northern Ireland) 2001 (S.R. 2001 No. 261)
- Royal Ulster Constabulary Pensions (Amendment) Regulations 2001 (S.R. 2001 No. 263)
- Rail Vehicle Accessibility Regulations (Northern Ireland) 2001 (S.R. 2001 No. 264)
- Rail Vehicle (Exemption Applications) Regulations (Northern Ireland) 2001 (S.R. 2001 No. 265)
- Motor Vehicles (Driving Licences) (Amendment) Regulations (Northern Ireland) 2001 (S.R. 2001 No. 267)
- Community Drivers' Hours (Foot-and-Mouth Disease) (Temporary Exception) (No. 2) (Amendment No. 2) Regulations (Northern Ireland) 2001 (S.R. 2001 No. 268)
- Environmentally Sensitive Areas Designation Order (Northern Ireland) 2001 (S.R. 2001 No. 269)
- Environmentally Sensitive Areas (Enforcement) Regulations (Northern Ireland) 2001 (S.R. 2001 No. 270)
- Beef Labelling (Enforcement) Regulations (Northern Ireland) 2001 (S.R. 2001 No. 271)
- Education (Student Loans) (Amendment) Regulations (Northern Ireland) 2001 (S.R. 2001 No. 276)
- Education (Student Support) Regulations (Northern Ireland) 2001 (S.R. 2001 No. 277)
- Social Security (Students and Income-Related Benefits Amendment) Regulations (Northern Ireland) 2001 (S.R. 2001 No. 278)
- Local Government (Discretionary Payments) Regulations (Northern Ireland) 2001 (S.R. 2001 No. 279)
- Plant Protection Products (Amendment) Regulations (Northern Ireland) 2001 (S.R. 2001 No. 280)
- Industrial Training Levy (Construction Industry) Order (Northern Ireland) 2001 (S.R. 2001 No. 281)
- Sex Discrimination (Indirect Discrimination and Burden of Proof) Regulations (Northern Ireland) 2001 (S.R. 2001 No. 282)
- Water (1999 Order) (Commencement and Transitional Provisions) Order (Northern Ireland) 2001 (S.R. 2001 No. 283)
- Control of Pollution (Applications and Registers) Regulations (Northern Ireland) 2001 (S.R. 2001 No. 284)
- Education (Grants for Disabled Postgraduate Students) Regulations (Northern Ireland) 2001 (S.R. 2001 No. 285)
- Catering Waste (Feeding to Livestock) Order (Northern Ireland) 2001 (S.R. 2001 No. 286)
- Welfare Reform and Pensions (Persons Abroad: Benefits for Widows and Widowers) (Consequential Amendments) Regulations (Northern Ireland) 2001 (S.R. 2001 No. 287)
- General Teaching Council for Northern Ireland (Constitution) Regulations (Northern Ireland) 2001 (S.R. 2001 No. 288)
- Income Support (General) (Standard Interest Rate Amendment No. 2) Regulations (Northern Ireland) 2001 (S.R. 2001 No. 289)
- Legal Advice and Assistance (Amendment No. 3) Regulations (Northern Ireland) 2001 (S.R. 2001 No. 290)
- Fisheries (Tagging and Logbook) Byelaws (Northern Ireland) 2001 (S.R. 2001 No. 291)
- Bovine Spongiform Encephalopathy Monitoring Regulations (Northern Ireland) 2001 (S.R. 2001 No. 292)
- Lands Tribunal (Salaries) Order (Northern Ireland) 2001 (S.R. 2001 No. 293)
- Community Drivers' Hours (Foot-and-Mouth Disease) (Temporary Exception) (No. 2) (Amendment No. 3) Regulations (Northern Ireland) 2001 (S.R. 2001 No. 294)
- Genetically Modified Organisms (Contained Use) Regulations (Northern Ireland) 2001 (S.R. 2001 No. 295)
- Food Protection (Emergency Prohibitions) Order (Northern Ireland) 2001 (S.R. 2001 No. 296)
- Students Awards Regulations (Northern Ireland) 2001 (S.R. 2001 No. 298)
- Road Traffic (Health Services Charges) (Appeals) Regulations (Northern Ireland) 2001 (S.R. 2001 No. 299)

== 301-400 ==
- Salaries (Assembly Ombudsman and Commissioner for Complaints) Order (Northern Ireland) 2001 (S.R. 2001 No. 302)
- Foot-and-Mouth Disease (Controlled Area) (No. 4) Order (Northern Ireland) 2001 (S.R. 2001 No. 303)
- Social Security (Medical Evidence) and Statutory Maternity Pay (Medical Evidence) (Amendment) Regulations (Northern Ireland) 2001 (S.R. 2001 No. 308)
- General Dental Services (Amendment No. 3) Regulations (Northern Ireland) 2001 (S.R. 2001 No. 309)
- Motor Vehicles (Driving Licences) (Amendment No. 2) (Test Fees) Regulations (Northern Ireland) 2001 (S.R. 2001 No. 310)
- Community Drivers' Hours (Foot-and-Mouth Disease) (Temporary Exception) (No. 2) (Amendment No. 4) Regulations (Northern Ireland) 2001 (S.R. 2001 No. 311)
- Animals and Animal Products (Import and Export) (Amendment) Regulations (Northern Ireland) 2001 (S.R. 2001 No. 312)
- Northern Ireland Social Care Council (Appointments and Procedure) Regulations (Northern Ireland) 2001 (S.R. 2001 No. 313)
- Social Security (Personal Allowances for Children and Young Persons Amendment) Regulations (Northern Ireland) 2001 (S.R. 2001 No. 314)
- Housing Renovation etc. Grants (Reduction of Grant) (Amendment) Regulations (Northern Ireland) 2001 (S.R. 2001 No. 315)
- Social Security (Incapacity Benefit) (Miscellaneous Amendments) Regulations (Northern Ireland) 2001 (S.R. 2001 No. 316)
- Life Sentence Review Commissioners' Rules 2001 (S.R. 2001 No. 317)
- Social Fund (Maternity and Funeral Expenses) (General) (Amendment) Regulations (Northern Ireland) 2001 (S.R. 2001 No. 318)
- Part-Time Workers (Prevention of Less Favourable Treatment) Regulations (Northern Ireland) 2001 (S.R. 2001 No. 319)
- Adoption (Intercountry Aspects) Act (Northern Ireland) 2001 (Commencement No. 1 Order (Northern Ireland) 2001 (S.R. 2001 No. 322)
- Health and Personal Social Services (2001 Act) (Commencement No. 2) Order (Northern Ireland) 2001 (S.R. 2001 No. 324)
- Vegetable Seeds (Amendment) Regulations (Northern Ireland) 2001 (S.R. 2001 No. 327)
- Oil and Fibre Plant Seeds (Amendment) Regulations (Northern Ireland) 2001 (S.R. 2001 No. 328)
- Fodder Plant Seeds (Amendment) Regulations (Northern Ireland) 2001 (S.R. 2001 No. 329)
- Cereal Seeds (Amendment) Regulations (Northern Ireland) 2001 (S.R. 2001 No. 330)
- Beet Seeds (Amendment) Regulations (Northern Ireland) 2001 (S.R. 2001 No. 331)
- Rural Development (Financial Assistance) Regulations (Northern Ireland) 2001 (S.R. 2001 No. 332)
- Foot-and-Mouth Disease (Controlled Area) (No. 5) Order (Northern Ireland) 2001 (S.R. 2001 No. 336)
- Life Sentences (Northern Ireland) Order 2001 (Commencement) Order 2001 (S.R. 2001 No. 337)
- Street Works (Sharing of Costs of Works) (Amendment) Regulations (Northern Ireland) 2001 (S.R. 2001 No. 338)
- General Ophthalmic Services (Amendment) Regulations (Northern Ireland) 2001 (S.R. 2001 No. 339)
- Community Drivers' Hours (Foot-and-Mouth Disease) (Temporary Exception) (No. 2) (Amendment No. 5) Regulations (Northern Ireland) 2001 (S.R. 2001 No. 340)
- Food Protection (Emergency Prohibitions No. 2) Order (Northern Ireland) 2001 (S.R. 2001 No. 341)
- Food Protection (Emergency Prohibitions) (Revocation) Order (Northern Ireland) 2001 (S.R. 2001 No. 342)
- Fire Precautions (Workplace) Regulations (Northern Ireland) 2001 (S.R. 2001 No. 348)
- Fishing Vessels (Decommissioning) Scheme (Northern Ireland) 2001 (S.R. 2001 No. 349)
- Suckler Cow Premium Regulations (Northern Ireland) 2001 (S.R. 2001 No. 362)
- Beef Special Premium Regulations (Northern Ireland) 2001 (S.R. 2001 No. 363)
- Motor Vehicle Testing (Amendment) Regulations (Northern Ireland) 2001 (S.R. 2001 No. 364)
- Goods Vehicles (Testing) (Amendment) Regulations (Northern Ireland) 2001 (S.R. 2001 No. 365)
- Public Service Vehicles (Amendment) Regulations (Northern Ireland) 2001 (S.R. 2001 No. 366)
- Health and Personal Social Services (Injury Benefits) Regulations (Northern Ireland) 2001 (S.R. 2001 No. 367)
- Food Protection (Emergency Prohibitions No. 3) Order (Northern Ireland) 2001 (S.R. 2001 No. 368)
- Police Trainee Regulations (Northern Ireland) 2001 (S.R. 2001 No. 369)
- Optical Charges and Payments and General Ophthalmic Services (Amendment) Regulations (Northern Ireland) 2001 (S.R. 2001 No. 370)
- Road Vehicles Lighting (Amendment No. 2) Regulations (Northern Ireland) 2001 (S.R. 2001 No. 372)
- Social Fund Winter Fuel Payment (Amendment) Regulations (Northern Ireland) 2001 (S.R. 2001 No. 373)
- General Medical Services (Amendment No. 4) Regulations (Northern Ireland) 2001 (S.R. 2001 No. 374)
- Road Traffic Offenders (Additional Offences and Prescribed Devices) Order (Northern Ireland) 2001 (S.R. 2001 No. 375)
- Specified Risk Material (Amendment No. 3) Regulations (Northern Ireland) 2001 (S.R. 2001 No. 376)
- Specified Risk Material (Amendment) (No. 2) Order (Northern Ireland) 2001 (S.R. 2001 No. 377)
- Rendering (Fluid Treatment) Order (Northern Ireland) 2001 (S.R. 2001 No. 378)
- Strangford Lough (Prohibition of Fishing for Shellfish) Regulations (Northern Ireland) 2001 (S.R. 2001 No. 379)
- Social Fund (Cold Weather Payments) (General) (Amendment) Regulations (Northern Ireland) 2001 (S.R. 2001 No. 386)
- Carriage of Explosives by Rail Regulations (Northern Ireland) 2001 (S.R. 2001 No. 387)
- Street Works (1995 Order) (Commencement No. 5) Order (Northern Ireland) 2001 (S.R. 2001 No. 388)
- Food Protection (Emergency Prohibitions No. 4) Order (Northern Ireland) 2001 (S.R. 2001 No. 389)
- Carriage of Explosives (Amendment) Regulations (Northern Ireland) 2001 (S.R. 2001 No. 390)
- Farm Subsidies (Review of Decisions) Regulations (Northern Ireland) 2001 (S.R. 2001 No. 391)
- Social Security (Capital Disregards Amendment No. 3) Regulations (Northern Ireland) 2001 (S.R. 2001 No. 392)
- Dogs (Licensing and Identification) (Amendment) Regulations (Northern Ireland) 2001 (S.R. 2001 No. 393)
- Drainage (Environmental Impact Assessment) Regulations (Northern Ireland) 2001 (S.R. 2001 No. 394)
- Local Government (General Grant) Order (Northern Ireland) 2001 (S.R. 2001 No. 395)
- Police (Northern Ireland) Act 2000 (Commencement No. 3 and Transitional Provisions) Order 2001 (S.R. 2001 No. 396)
- Foyle Area and Carlingford Area (Licensing of Fishing Engines) Regulations 2001 (S.R. 2001 No. 397)
- Community Drivers' Hours (Foot-and-Mouth Disease) (Temporary Exception) (No. 2) (Amendment No. 6) Regulations (Northern Ireland) 2001 (S.R. 2001 No. 398)
- Food Protection (Emergency Prohibitions No. 2) (Revocation) Order (Northern Ireland) 2001 (S.R. 2001 No. 399)
- Rehabilitation of Offenders (Exceptions) (Amendment) (No. 2) Order (Northern Ireland) 2001 (S.R. 2001 No. 400)

== 401-500 ==
- Plant Health (Wood and Bark) (Amendment) Order (Northern Ireland) 2001 (S.R. 2001 No. 401)
- Motor Vehicles (Driving Licences) (Amendment No. 2) Regulations (Northern Ireland) 2001 (S.R. 2001 No. 402)
- Processed Animal Protein Regulations (Northern Ireland) 2001 (S.R. 2001 No. 405)
- Income Support (General) and Jobseeker's Allowance (Amendment) Regulations (Northern Ireland) 2001 (S.R. 2001 No. 406)
- Food Protection (Emergency Prohibitions) (Revocation No. 2) Order (Northern Ireland) 2001 (S.R. 2001 No. 407)
- Colours in Food (Amendment) Regulations (Northern Ireland) 2001 (S.R. 2001 No. 408)
- Street Works (Inspection Fees) Regulations (Northern Ireland) 2001 (S.R. 2001 No. 409)
- Income Support (General) (Standard Interest Rate Amendment No. 3) Regulations (Northern Ireland) 2001 (S.R. 2001 No. 410)
- Sheep Annual Premium (Amendment) Regulations (Northern Ireland) 2001 (S.R. 2001 No. 411)
- Occupational Pensions (Revaluation) Order (Northern Ireland) 2001 (S.R. 2001 No. 412)
- Street Works (Maintenance) Regulations (Northern Ireland) 2001 (S.R. 2001 No. 413)
- Gaming (Variation of Monetary Limits) Order (Northern Ireland) 2001 (S.R. 2001 No. 414)
- Gaming (Bingo) (Amendment) Regulations (Northern Ireland) 2001 (S.R. 2001 No. 415)
- Social Security Fraud (2001 Act) (Commencement No. 1) Order (Northern Ireland) 2001 (S.R. 2001 No. 416)
- Miscellaneous Food Additives (Amendment No. 2) Regulations (Northern Ireland) 2001 (S.R. 2001 No. 419)
- Social Security (Notification of Change of Circumstances) Regulations (Northern Ireland) 2001 (S.R. 2001 No. 420)
- Fair Employment (Specification of Public Authorities) (Amendment) Order (Northern Ireland) 2001 (S.R. 2001 No. 421)
- Biocidal Products Regulations (Northern Ireland) 2001 (S.R. 2001 No. 422)
- New Deal (Lone Parents) (Miscellaneous Provisions) Order (Northern Ireland) 2001 (S.R. 2001 No. 423)
- Foot-and-Mouth Disease (Controlled Area) (No. 6) Order (Northern Ireland) 2001 (S.R. 2001 No. 424)
- Legal Aid in Criminal Proceedings (Costs) (Amendment No. 2) Rules (Northern Ireland) 2001 (S.R. 2001 No. 426)
- Feeding Stuffs (Amendment) Regulations (Northern Ireland) 2001 (S.R. 2001 No. 428)
- Poultry Meat, Farmed Game Bird Meat and Rabbit Meat (Hygiene and Inspection) (Amendment) Regulations (Northern Ireland) 2001 (S.R. 2001 No. 429)
- Misuse of Drugs (Designation) Order (Northern Ireland) 2001 (S.R. 2001 No. 431)
- Magistrates' Courts (Amendment) Rules (Northern Ireland) 2001 (S.R. 2001 No. 432)
- Fisheries (Amendment) Byelaws (Northern Ireland) 2001 (S.R. 2001 No. 433)
- Road Traffic (Health Services Charges) (Amendment) Regulations (Northern Ireland) 2001 (S.R. 2001 No. 434)
- Environmental Impact Assessment (Uncultivated Land and Semi-Natural Areas) Regulations (Northern Ireland) 2001 (S.R. 2001 No. 435)
- Radiation (Emergency Preparedness and Public Information) Regulations (Northern Ireland) 2001 (S.R. 2001 No. 436)
- Plant Health (Amendment) Order (Northern Ireland) 2001 (S.R. 2001 No. 437)
- Welfare Reform and Pensions (1999 Order) (Commencement No. 9) Order (Northern Ireland) 2001 (S.R. 2001 No. 438)
- Disability Discrimination Act 1995 (Commencement No. 8) Order (Northern Ireland) 2001 (S.R. 2001 No. 439)
- Additional Pension and Social Security Pensions (Home Responsibilities) (Amendment) Regulations (Northern Ireland) 2001 (S.R. 2001 No. 440)
- Social Security (Inherited SERPS) Regulations (Northern Ireland) 2001 (S.R. 2001 No. 441)
