= Police (Northern Ireland) Act 2003 =

Act of the Parliament of the United Kingdom

Police (Northern Ireland) Act 2003 (Note: Section 47.)
- Act of Parliament
- Parliament of the United Kingdom
- Long title: An Act to make provision about policing in Northern Ireland and the exercise of police powers in Northern Ireland by persons who are not police officers; and to amend the Police and Criminal Evidence (Northern Ireland) Order 1989.
- Citation: 2003 c. 6
- Territorial extent: Northern Ireland (Note: Section 46.)

Dates
- Royal assent: 8 April 2003
- Commencement: 8 April 2003 (Note: Section 4(b) of the Interpretation Act 1978.)
Other legislation
Amends	Terrorism Act 2000; Police (Northern Ireland) Act 2000
Amended by	Northern Ireland (St Andrews Agreement) Act 2006; Justice Act (Northern Ireland) 2011; Offensive Weapons Act 2019; Tobacco and Vapes Act 2026

Status: Amended

History of passage through Parliament

Text of statute as originally enacted

Revised text of statute as amended

The Police (Northern Ireland) Act 2003 (c. 6) is an act of the Parliament of the United Kingdom.

It implements recommendations made in the Patten report.

== Provisions ==
The act strengthens the role of the Northern Ireland Policing Board and it also clarifies the relationship between the board and the chief constable.

== See also ==
- Police (Northern Ireland) Act 2000
- Police Act
