= Independent Commission on Policing for Northern Ireland =

Commission established in 1998

The Independent Commission on Policing for Northern Ireland was established in 1998 as part of the Belfast Agreement, intended as a major step in the Northern Ireland peace process. Chaired by Conservative politician and the last Governor of Hong Kong Chris Patten, it was better known as the Patten Commission and it produced a report in 1999 known as the Patten Report. The other members of the Commission were Maurice Hayes, Peter Smith, Kathleen O'Toole, Gerald W. Lynch, Sir John Smith, Lucy Woods and Professor Clifford Shearing. The Secretary to the Commission was Bob Peirce, who drafted the report.

== Terms of reference ==
Under the terms of reference defined in the Belfast Agreement, the Commission was to inquire into policing in Northern Ireland, consult widely, and make proposals for future policing structures and arrangements, including the police force composition, recruitment, training, culture, ethos and symbols.

The aim of the proposals was to create a police service that would be effective, operate in partnership with the community, cooperate with the Garda Síochána and other police forces, and be accountable both to the law and the community which it was to serve.

== Report ==
On 9 September 1999 the Commission produced its report, entitled A New Beginning: Policing in Northern Ireland popularly known as the Patten Report, which contained 175 symbolic and practical recommendations. Key recommendations included:

- renaming the Royal Ulster Constabulary the Police Service of Northern Ireland;
- a new Policing Board and District Policing Partnership Boards to ensure accountability;
- creation of a Police Ombudsman and a Complaints Tribunal;
- removal of most visible symbols of Britishness from the police service;
- a 50-50 recruitment policy for Catholics and Protestants;
- a new code of ethics and oath of office, including a strong emphasis on human rights;
- an emphasis on community policing and normalisation;
- proposals for training, community liaison, cooperation with other police services, and recruitment from outside Northern Ireland; and
- repeal by the Gaelic Athletic Association of its Rule 21, which prohibited members of the police or Army in Northern Ireland from being members of the Association.

== Effect ==
The recommendations contained in the report have been partly implemented by the Police (Northern Ireland) Act 2000 and the Police (Northern Ireland) Act 2003. Sinn Féin, which represents a quarter of Northern Ireland's voters, refused to endorse the new force until the Patten recommendations had been implemented in full, but voted to support the force in 2007 and now take their seats on the Northern Ireland Policing Board. The recommendation to change the RUC name to Northern Ireland Police Service was changed to Police Service of Northern Ireland instead. A Gaelic Athletic Association convention repealed Rule 21 (a ban on members of the British army and the Royal Ulster Constabulary from playing Gaelic games), although almost all of the votes to do so came from the Republic (there were exceptions: Kerry, Cavan and Monaghan voted against repealing the rule). Of the six associations in Northern Ireland, only County Down voted to repeal it.

== Affirmative action measures ==
Affirmative action in Northern Ireland denotes proactive measures seeking to redress inequalities experienced by a particular group. The Equalities Review defines the goal of equality in a democratic society as: ‘An equal society [which] protects and promotes equal, real freedom and … removes the barriers that limit what people can do and can be.’ The backdrop to affirmative action in Northern Ireland (NI) was, "[t]hirty years of internal war [which] intensified already deeply etched fissures and suspicions" between the Roman Catholic and Protestant communities. The recognition of the dominance of the two populace lead to proactive measures in anti-discrimination legislation.

== Context ==
=== Policing in Northern Ireland ===
Traces of proactive equality measures can be traced back to the Fair Employment Act (NI) 1976. This legislation recognised the importance of equality in the workplace between Protestant and Roman Catholic communities. With the 1989 Amendment imposing positive duties on employers to prevent discrimination. Such actions have led to the NI approach of addressing inequality of opportunity to be considered as "radically different" to the rest of the United Kingdom (UK).

The Good Friday Agreement 1998 provided the agenda of creating a "new beginning to policing [in] Northern Ireland, with a police service capable of attracting and sustaining support from the community as a whole." The Cameron Report identified that incidents of misconduct in the Royal Ulster Constabulary (RUC), such as the widely televised unrest erupting from the Civil Rights March on 5 October 1968, added weight its public perception as a Protestant organisation. The NI Affairs Committee noted that ‘whether criticism of the force has been justified or not, it is the case that any settlement in Northern Ireland involves policing issues’.

Whilst the RUC had an affirmative action programme in place, this was largely ineffective. A reflection of the data demonstrates the Roman Catholic representation of the police force to increase from 7.4% in 1991 to a mere 8.2% seven years later.

=== Patten Report ===
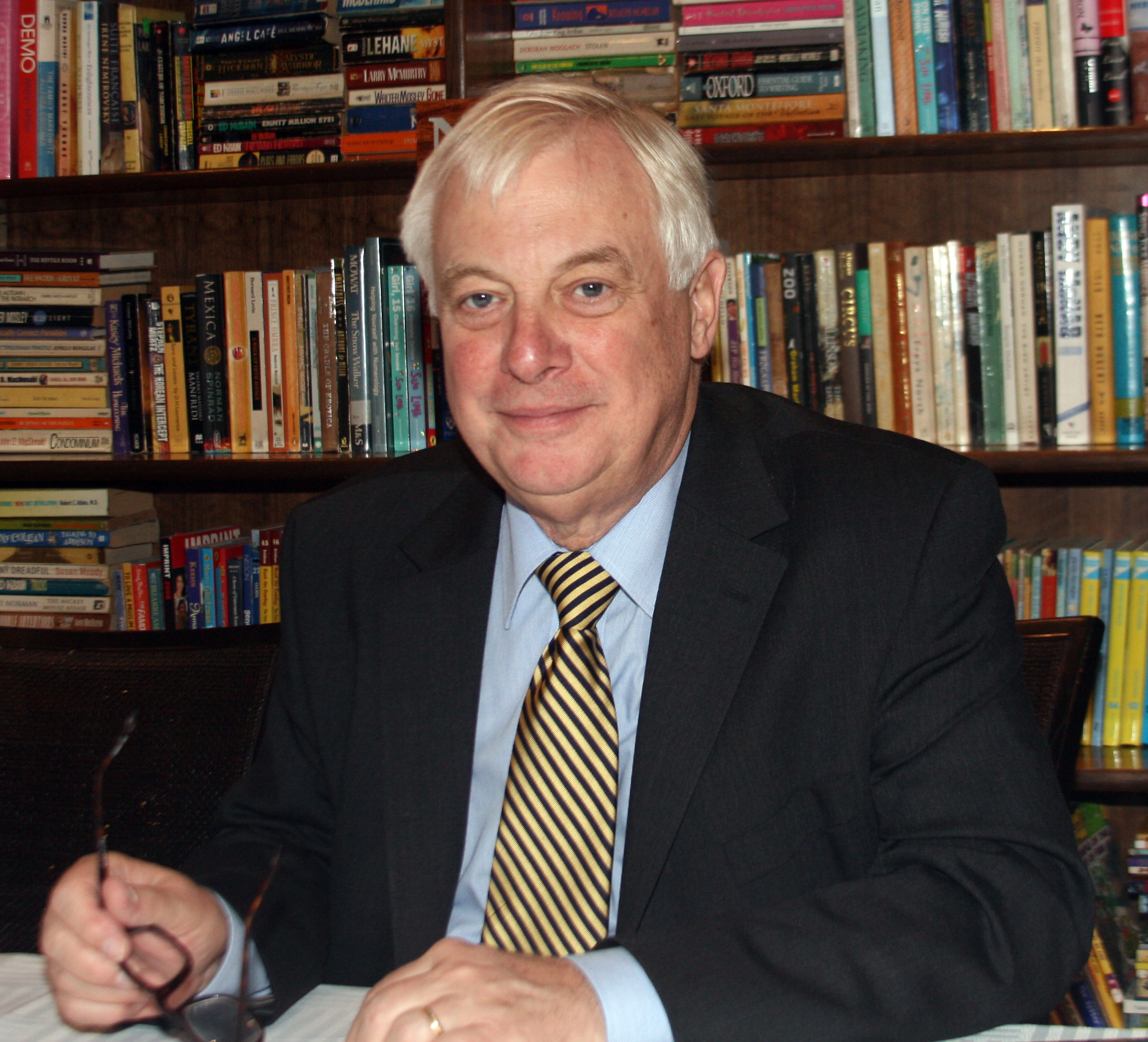
Chris Patten, former Governor of Hong Kong led ‘A New Beginning: Policing in Northern Ireland - The Report of the Independent Commission on Policing for Northern Ireland’ (1999) (referred to as the Patten Report)

A post conflict solution arising from the Independent Commission on Policing, led by Chris Patten, included proposals for more inclusive policing arrangements. The aim was to create a police force more representative of the society it serves. The immediate rebranding of policing to the "PSNI" (Police Service of Northern Ireland) sought to overcome the backdrop of discrimination that had become synonymous with the former institution. The report was a comprehensive plan including proactive measures regarding gender equality, community awareness training and changing the culture and ethos of the police.

A key focus was placed on the 50:50 recruitment measure, which proposed that ‘an equal number of Protestant and Catholics would be drawn from the pool of qualified candidates.’

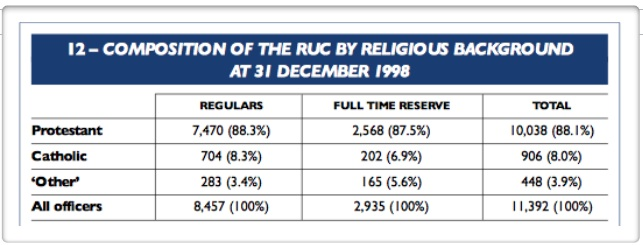
Patten Report. Fig. 12

The pursuit of a more proportional representation was critical in adopting this temporary measure (See table, fig 12) in addition to the certainty of results it was likely to produce within a reasonable timeframe. A broader reading of the contemporary political context in NI implicates the measure with the long term goal of achieving peace within NI. The Patten Report noted the findings from the, "Community Attitudes Survey which found that over three quarters of all Catholics thought there were too few Catholics represented and over 60% of all Protestants agreed." The Report also recognised that for effective policing in a democracy, it must be based on consent across the community. It was particularly important to restore the police’s legitimacy and public confidence.

Whilst the Patten proposals were largely accepted by the Secretary of State, the temporary 50:50 recruitment measure was not universally welcomed. In particular, the measure was not welcomed by Unionist political parties. The temporary 50:50 recruitment measure came into effect by the enactment of the Police (NI) Act 2000.

== Evaluation ==
=== Academic commentary ===
Advocates of such measures, such as Sandra Fredman point to a number of advantages and justifications for supporting affirmative action. Fredman argues that affirmative action programmes can lead to greater integration of minorities within the community which can, in turn, help to reduce inequalities. These improvements help to reverse the negative effects of past discrimination. However, Fredman also recognises the ability of affirmative action to change inequality in the future. One benefit she notes is the creation of role models for other individuals within the traditionally disadvantaged community. This can pave the way for a change in attitude and thus predicate institutional change.

The "merit principle" has long been an important term in determining the appropriate scope of affirmative action. As Son Hing, Bobocel and Zanna note, typically people who strongly endorse the merit principle and believe that outcomes should be given to those most deserving, oppose affirmative action programmes that violate this principle. Sally Wokes highlights that affirmative action violates the essential principle of equality, suggesting that it is likely to increase tensions between communities and lead to the stigmatisation of those groups which benefit. She also questions the validity of the ‘role model’ argument on the basis that the perceived lack of merit undermines the legitimacy of their position, thus negating their positive influence as a role model. Furthermore, Wokes suggests that affirmative action will only benefit the least deprived members of a minority, therefore doing little to tackle the underlying disadvantage.

=== Impact on Northern Ireland policing ===
In December 1998, the Catholic proportion of the police service represented 8.3% this had significantly increased by March 2011 to 29.7%. Owen Paterson viewed this result as a ‘tremendous change’ which was at the top end of the Patten Report’s critical mass. In August 2014, the Catholic proportion had increased to 30.75%.

Catholic confidence in the PSNI has continued to increase. In December 2006, 79% had some level of confidence in the PSNI, as compared to 75% in September 2005. This is broadly similar to Protestant confidence levels which have remained static at 80%. However, critics point to questions around falling levels of public confidence in some loyalist and republican communities.

Nevertheless, the discriminatory impact on other communities, specifically Protestant, has been acknowledged against this context of increasing Catholic representation and support for the police. The Parliamentary Under Secretary of State for NI, Ian Pearson, stated that "our figures on discrimination against the Protestant community by the policy show that, to date 440 people have been discriminated against".

Furthermore, Patrick Yu (Executive Director of the Northern Ireland Council for Ethnic Minorities) criticises the 50:50 measure, for categorising Catholics and ‘non-Catholics,’ highlighting that the legislation addresses only two communities, with all other minorities, ’fall(ing) through the gap.’ It is however noted that by August 2014, ethnic minorities employed as police officers stood at 0.51% of the population, which is broadly in line with census data.

Policing in NI continues to evolve and its effectiveness will be subject to ongoing review and evaluation by the Policing Board. A Public Accounts Committee report stated almost 40% of all temporary workers were former police officers and nearly 20% of Patten retirees were reemployed by the PSNI as temporary staff. This has provoked criticism that the results produced by the Patten recommendations are somewhat superficial.

Given the close alignment between the political context and policing, the affirmative action measures and their effectiveness will constantly be subject to review and evaluation. It is possible that the compositional improvements of the PSNI may have influenced the Metropolitan Police in London to call for positive action measures to increase the representation of ethnic minorities.

== See also ==
- Affirmative Action § United Kingdom
