= Police (Northern Ireland) Act 2000 =

Act of the Parliament of the United Kingdom

Police (Northern Ireland) Act 2000 (Note: Section 81.)
- Act of Parliament
- Parliament of the United Kingdom
- Long title: An Act to make provision about policing in Northern Ireland; and for connected purposes.
- Citation: 2000 c. 32
- Territorial extent: Northern Ireland; England and Wales (section 78(2)); Scotland (section 78(2)); (Note: Section 80.)

Dates
- Royal assent: 23 November 2000
- Commencement: Various (Note: Section 79.)
Other legislation
Amends	House of Commons Disqualification Act 1975; Aviation Security Act 1982; Official Secrets Act 1989
Amended by	Police (Northern Ireland) Act 2003; Justice (Northern Ireland) Act 2004; Northern Ireland (St Andrews Agreement) Act 2006; Justice Act (Northern Ireland) 2011

Status: Amended

Text of statute as originally enacted

Revised text of statute as amended

The Police (Northern Ireland) Act 2000 (c. 32) is an act of the Parliament of the United Kingdom. The act renamed the Royal Ulster Constabulary (RUC) to the Police Service of Northern Ireland (PSNI). It also created the Northern Ireland Policing Board and District Police Partnerships. The act was designed to gain cross-community support for law enforcement in Northern Ireland with several initiatives included in the act, including a change of oath of office and a 50:50 recruitment policy for Protestants and Roman Catholics.

The bill for this act received its first reading in the House of Commons on 16 May 2000.

== Background ==
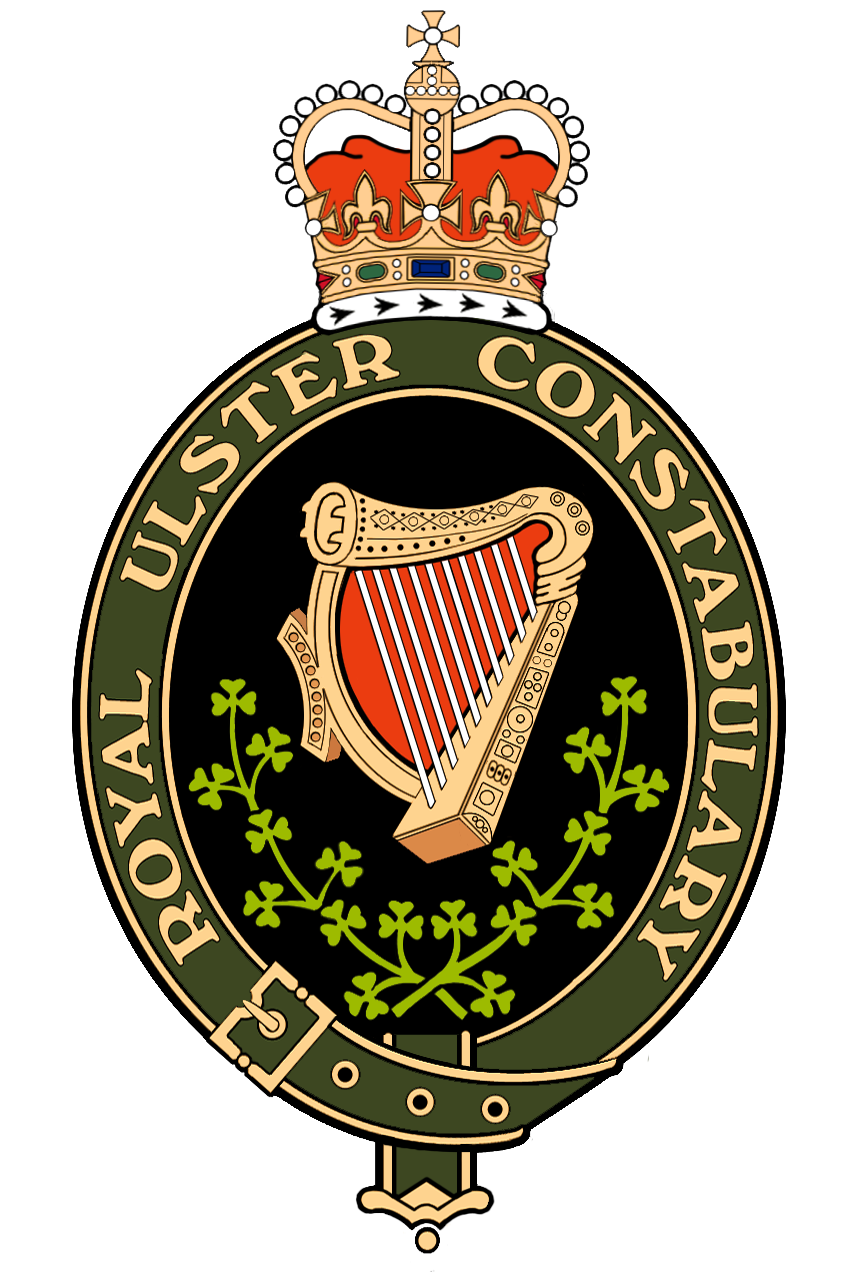
Royal Ulster Constabulary badge

The Royal Ulster Constabulary had been responsible for law enforcement in Northern Ireland since being split from the all-Ireland Royal Irish Constabulary before the partition of Ireland. During The Troubles, they had been accused by nationalists of having a unionist bias against the nationalist minority. Despite this, they had a reputation as an efficient anti-terrorism police force and were collectively awarded the George Cross by Queen Elizabeth II.

Following the Good Friday Agreement in 1998 to end hostilities in Northern Ireland, a report was set up led by the former Governor of Hong Kong Chris Patten to look into giving policing in Northern Ireland cross-community consent. The majority of the report from the Independent Commission on Policing for Northern Ireland (known as the Patten Report) suggested substituting the Royal Ulster Constabulary for a more representative force with a change of name and reduction of numbers. The Police (Northern Ireland) Act was intended to fulfill this report though it was amended when going through Parliament.

== Name of the force ==
The first clause of the act covered the name of the police force. The Patten Report originally suggested naming the force the "Northern Ireland Police Service". The government of the United Kingdom adapted the proposal and put forward for the force to be named "Police Service of Northern Ireland" instead as they disliked the acronym of NIPS. Unionists wanted to retain the royal title in the name of the new police force, with the Ulster Unionist Party leader and First Minister of Northern Ireland, David Trimble citing not many British police forces had a royal title and felt that the heritage of the Royal Ulster Constabulary was being ignored. During the debate on the bill, MPs cited that there were several organisations in the Republic of Ireland, such as the Royal Irish Yacht Club and the Royal Irish Academy, that retained a royal title without comment. In the House of Lords, the former leader of the nationalist Social Democratic and Labour Party, Lord Fitt also requested that the Royal Ulster Constabulary retain its name. Following pressure from the Conservative Party, the government compromised and the Police (Northern Ireland) Act 2000 decreed the official name of the force to be the "Police Service of Northern Ireland (incorporating the Royal Ulster Constabulary)". The act also provided for the Royal Ulster Constabulary George Cross Foundation to be established for "marking the sacrifices and honouring the achievements of the Royal Ulster Constabulary".

== Police authority ==
A new Northern Ireland Policing Board would be created under the act to replace the Police Authority of Northern Ireland. The Patten Report suggested having political representation on the board with local divisions corresponding to Northern Irish district councils being appointed with full administrative oversight. The Sinn Féin leader Gerry Adams wanted the Patten Report's suggestions to be fully implemented. However following unionist concerns that the proposed districts would give members of the IRA too much influence over the police, the proposals were watered down to allow Chief Constables to challenge decisions made by the board. Sinn Féin initially refused to take their seats on the Policing Board as a result. They would eventually do so in 2007.

== Recruitment ==
The act included a provision regarding recruitment for new police officers. It stated that the force's size should be reduced by 4,500 officers over ten years. It was felt that the force was too large for a peacetime service. A generous severance scheme was set up to compensate any officers who left the police as a result. At the time of the act's passage, the Royal Ulster Constabulary had a 9:1 ratio of Protestant to Roman Catholic officers. The act provided that recruitment would be done on a 50:50 basis to gradually lead towards a police force that was 50 per cent Protestant and 50 per cent Catholic. This proposal in the Patten Report was made in the hope that the Gaelic Athletic Association (GAA) would repeal Rule 21 which prohibited members of British police forces from playing Gaelic games. The GAA eventually did this in 2001. The act also followed on from a policy change that stated constables would no longer have to swear an oath of allegiance to the Queen in 1997.

In 2011, the British government voted to repeal the 50:50 recruitment requirement when Catholic membership numbered 30 per cent of the police. Nationalist politicians believed it was a successful policy however unionists stated that the policy had discriminated against Protestants. Calls have been made by Catholic clergymen for the policy to be restored until the force was 50:50.

== Miscellaneous provisions ==
The act provided for cross-border support with the police of the Republic of Ireland, Garda Síochána, with the opportunities for PSNI officers to go on secondment with the Garda and vice versa. The act also stated that the Secretary of State for Northern Ireland had the power to decide the PSNI's uniform and flags. Their new uniform retained the rifle green colour of the Royal Ulster Constabulary but included name tags, against the wishes of the Police Federation. The Secretary of State would also be able to rule if the Union Jack would be able to fly over PSNI police stations as they had under the Royal Ulster Constabulary.

=== Notifiable organisations ===
The act stipulated that members of the police force would be required to declare their membership of certain ‘notifiable organisations’. The final draft of the bill included Opus Dei, a prelature of the Catholic Church, as one such organisation. The Church objected to Opus Dei’s inclusion in the act, with Archbishop Luciano Storero, the papal nuncio to Ireland, writing to the Northern Ireland Secretary claiming that it constituted religious discrimination. The government agreed to remove Opus Dei from the bill in the House of Lords.

== See also ==
- Belfast Agreement
- Independent Commission on Policing for Northern Ireland
- Police (Northern Ireland) Act 2003
