= List of terrorist incidents in 1989 =

This is a timeline of incidents in 1989 that have been labelled as "terrorism" and are not believed to have been carried out by a government or its forces (see state terrorism and state-sponsored terrorism).

== Guidelines ==
- To be included, entries must be notable (have a stand-alone article) and described by a consensus of reliable sources as "terrorism".
- List entries must comply with the guidelines outlined in the manual of style under MOS:TERRORIST.
- Casualty figures in this list are the total casualties of the incident including immediate casualties and later casualties (such as people who succumbed to their wounds long after the attacks occurred).
- Casualties listed are the victims. Perpetrator casualties are listed separately (e.g. x (+y) indicate that x victims and y perpetrators were killed/injured).
- Casualty totals may be underestimated or unavailable due to a lack of information. A figure with a plus (+) sign indicates that at least that many people have died (e.g. 10+ indicates that at least 10 people have died) – the actual toll could be considerably higher. A figure with a plus (+) sign may also indicate that over that number of people are victims.
- If casualty figures are 20 or more, they will be shown in **bold**. In addition, figures for casualties more than 50 will also be **underlined**.
- Incidents are limited to one per location per day. If multiple attacks occur in the same place on the same day, they will be merged into a single incident.
- In addition to the guidelines above, the table also includes the following categories:

0 people were killed/injured by the incident.
1–19 people were killed/injured by the incident.
20–49 people were killed/injured by the incident.
50–99 people were killed/injured by the incident.
100+ people were killed/injured by the incident.

== List ==
| Date | Type | Dead | Injured | Location | Details | Perpetrator | Part of |
|---|---|---|---|---|---|---|---|
| February 23–24 | Shooting, Clash | 13 (28+ attackers) and a horse | 53 (4 missing) | Buenos Aires, Argentina | The 1989 attack on La Tablada barracks was an attempt to occupy the barracks of the Mechanized Infantry Regiment 3 General Belgrano of the Argentine Army in La Tablada, Buenos Aires Province, by members of the All Movement for the Fatherland (MTP). 32 guerrillas, 9 soldiers and 2 policemen were killed. | MTP | |
| February 28 | Firebombing | 0 | 0 | New York City, United States | The offices of the newspaper The Riverdale Press are firebombed in the Bronx. The attack came shortly after the paper published an article defending Salman Rushdie over his book the Satanic Verses. | Unknown Islamist(s) | The Satanic Verses controversy |
| May 24 | Assassination | 2 | 0 | La Paz, Bolivia | Assassinations of Elders Jeffrey Brent Ball and Todd Ray Wilson: Assassinations of LDS Missionaries | Zarate Willka Armed Forces of Liberation | Terrorism in Bolivia |
| May 30 | Bombing, attempted assassination | 4 | 37 | Colombia | A bomb kills four and injures 37 on an assassination attempt against Miguel Maza Márquez, head of the Colombian Secret Service. | Unknown | Colombian conflict |
| July–December | Bioattack | 0 | 0 | Southern California, United States | Several outbreaks of medflies occurred, particularly in the Los Angeles metropolitan area. The outbreaks devastated crops. On December 8, a group calling themselves "The Breeders" claimed responsibility for the outbreaks and stated it was retaliation for California's malathion aerial spraying program. However, no one from "The Breeders" was ever arrested and they were never heard from again after the attacks ceased. California stopped its malathion program shortly after The Breeders claimed responsibility. | The Breeders/Unknown | |
| July 5 | Car bomb | 0 | 33 | Callao, Peru | Soviet sailors shopping in the port were targeted as a bomb that was placed under one of their buses exploded. | Shining Path | Internal conflict in Peru |
| July 6 | Hijacking | 16 | 27 | Kiryat Ye'arim, Israel | An Egged bus is hijacked and driven off a cliff while en route to Jerusalem from Tel Aviv. The hijacker, Abd al-Hadi Rafa Ghanim of the Palestinian Islamic Jihad, survives. | Palestinian Islamic Jihad | Israeli–Palestinian conflict |
| August 9 | Car bomb | 2 occupants of car | 6 IDF and SLA soldiers. | Israel's self-proclaimed security zone in South Lebanon. | Retaliation for the Israeli kidnapping of Sheikh Abdel Karim Obeid | claimed by Hizbullah | Lebanese Civil War |
| August 18 | Assassinations | 2 | 14 | Soacha, Medellín, Colombia | Gunmen assassinate both presidential candidate Luis Carlos Galán and Waldemar Franklin Quintero. 10 bodyguards of Galan were injured at a rally and 4 were injured in Waldemar's attack | Medellín cartel | Colombian conflict |
| September 19 | Bombing | 170 | 0 | Ténéré, Niger | French airliner UTA Flight 772 is bombed en route from Brazzaville to Paris, and comes down in the Ténéré desert. All 170 people on board were killed. The attack is believed to have been carried out by Libyan agents in retaliation for France's support of Chad during the Chadian–Libyan conflict. | Libya (suspected) | |
| September 22 | Deal barracks bombing | 11 | 21 | Kent, United Kingdom | Deal barracks bombing – the Provisional IRA (IRA) exploded a time bomb at the Royal Marines School of Music building, Deal Barracks. The building collapsed, killing 11 marines from the Royal Marines Band Service and wounding another 21. | Provisional IRA | The Troubles |
| November 27 | Bombing | 110 | 0 | Soacha, Colombia | Avianca Flight 203 is bombed en route from Bogotá to Cali. Medellín cartel hitman Dandeny Muñoz Mosquera is convicted for the bombing. | Medellín cartel | |
| November 30 | Bombing, assassination | 1 | 0 | Bad Homburg vor der Höhe, Germany | Bomb assassination and murder of banker Alfred Herrhausen. The Red Army Fraction was behind the attack. | Red Army Fraction | |
| December 6 | Truck bombing | 70 | 600+ | Bogotá, Colombia | A truck bomb at the DAS headquarters kills 52 people and injures over a thousand. The Medellín Cartel was responsible. | Medellín Cartel | Colombian conflict |
| December 6 | Mass Shooting | 14 (+1) | 14 | Montreal, Quebec, Canada | Fourteen women were killed in an anti-feminist mass shooting at an engineering university. | Marc Lépine | |
| December 8 | Kidnapping | 0 | 1 (kidnapped) | Nowgam, India | Rubaiya Sayeed, the daughter of Mufti Mohammad Sayeed, the then home minister of India, is kidnapped by terrorists from the Jammu Kashmir Liberation Front. She is released five days later after five imprisoned JKLF terrorists were released. | JKLF | Insurgency in Jammu and Kashmir |

== See also ==
- List of terrorist incidents
