= Terrorism in Bolivia =

Terrorism in Bolivia has occurred since the 1960s and continues sporadically until the present. A number of bombings targeted public places, such as bank branches, ATM's, commercial institutions and interests generally leaving material damage.

== 1980s ==
Several international terrorist meetings were reported to have been held in Bolivia in the 1980s, including three in 1985 and 1986 that were attended by terrorist representatives from other South American countries. Two meetings between Bolivian left-wing extremists and representatives of other South American terrorist organizations allegedly were held in Cobija, Pando Department, and in La Paz in 1985. According to the deputy minister of interior, migration, and justice, representatives of terrorist organizations from eight countries held another meeting in Santa Cruz de la Sierra in February 1986.

In early 1987, Peru's Sendero Luminoso (Shining Path) began to concern Bolivian civilian and military authorities after they learned that its strategic plan called for expanding terrorist actions into Bolivia and Ecuador. Various press reports in 1987 and 1988 suggested that Sendero Luminoso guerrillas were using Bolivian territory, especially La Paz, to obtain medical assistance, medicine, food, weapons, and other supplies to support their revolutionary activities in Peru.

A total of six international terrorist incidents took place in Bolivia in 1988, compared with three in 1987. A previously unknown group called the Revolutionary Labor Movement (Movimiento Obrero Revolucionario—MOR) claimed responsibility for assassinating the Peruvian military attaché in La Paz in December 1988, an act that the Bolivian police commander attributed to Sendero Luminoso. A number of politically oriented terrorist incidents took place in the months leading up to the May 1989 elections.

A terrorist group called the Zarate Willka Armed Forces of Liberation (Fuerzas Armadas de Liberación Zárate Willka—FALZW), presumably another name for the FIPZW, took responsibility for a bombing in December 1988 that caused much damage to the offices of the president of the Chamber of Deputies and for machine gunning to death two young Mormon missionary from Utah in a La Paz barrio in May 1989. Pre-election terrorism by unknown perpetrators in March 1989 included bombings at various political party offices in the La Paz area that caused considerable property damage and a bomb attempt at the United States embassy.

== Terrorism by context ==
=== Marxist guerrillas ===
On June 11, 1990, members of the CNPZ group kidnapped businessman Jorge Lonsdale, the manager of the Vascal bottling firm (a Coca-Cola distributor), shareholder in La Razón newspaper, and member of La Paz's Club Social. Lonsdale's family members and the authorities were initially unaware that his kidnapping was the act of a political organization rather an ordinary attempt to extract ransom.

Members of the Néstor Paz Zamora Commission publicized its existence with graffiti bearing its initials and the phrase Bolivia digna y soberana (Bolivia dignified and sovereign) in August 1990. The group first gained international attention following an attack on the marine guardhouse at the United States embassy in October 1990. During the October attack a police guard was shot dead. On December 4, police with the Centro Especial de Investigaciones Policiales (CEIP) captured Evaristo Salazar, one of two members of the Peruvian Túpac Amaru Revolutionary Movement operating within the CNPZ, during a sting operation in which Lonsdale's family promised to deliver ransom. Bolivian police fatally tortured Salazar, discovered the location where the group was keeping Lonsdale, and finally shot him later that night.

During a police operation to retrieve Lonsdale, the kidnapped businessman and three CNPZ guerrillas were killed by gunshots, while two other CNPZ members were captured alive. A forensic report indicates that at least one of the guerrillas, Italian national Michael Northfuster, was shot at close range in an apparent execution.

Another group, the Zarate Willka Armed Forces of Liberation claimed responsibility for an assassination attempt on United States Secretary of State George P. Shultz in August 1988, the bombing of the Bolivian Parliament in December 1988, another bombing which caused a local blackout, the bombing of the Church of Jesus Christ of Latter-day Saints meetinghouse, the killings of two American missionaries for The Church of Jesus Christ of Latter-day Saints on May 24, 1989, and the bombing of the US Embassy in a failed attempt to assassinate US Ambassador Robert S. Gelbard on December 20, 1989. By 1991, most members of the group had been apprehended, tried, convicted and imprisoned, and the organization was effectively disbanded.

The most important of this group were the Túpac Katari Guerrilla Army, of indigenist inspiration, the movement had a multiracial membership. The organization descended directly from the original revolutionaries trained by Che Guevara in the 1960s. Their objective was to fight for social equality in Bolivia and amongst its indigenous population. They carried out their first attack on July 5, 1991, destroying an electric power pylon in El Alto, a major city which adjoins La Paz, Bolivia's administrative capital. Most of the group's attacks have been similarly small-scale and they had confined their activities largely to Bolivia. The group suffered a major setback in a crackdown in 1992, when much of its leadership was neutralized through incarceration.

=== 21st-century incidents ===
In 13 May of 2005 an "cachorro" in front of the Petrobras offices in the city of Santa Cruz de la Sierra, Subsequently, different media received a video in which a Frente Nacional Anti-Corruption claims the action, in a video statement which claim a letter to Carlos Mesa and demanding 15 days for the Government to nationalize hydrocarbons and confiscate all the assets of former President Gonzalo Sánchez de Lozada.

On 10 February 2018, an explosion occurred in the afternoon of the Bolivian city of Oruro during the traditional carnival of the city. Three days later in a street food stand, 8 people were killed by an explosion near the main street of Oruro. At first it was thought that it was the explosion of a gas canister due to mishandling, but not finding fragments of the alleged canister or a gas leak that caused it, the government has discarded this theory. It also left more than fifty people were injured. The culprit of both explosions is unknown, but there have been several detainees. Three suspects who were in the explosion site of the second explosion were arrested the following day.

Another suspect of the first explosion continues apprehended since 27 March 2018. The 2018 Oruro attacks were considered the worst attack against civilians in the 21st century.
