= Dandeny Muñoz Mosquera =

Former chief assassin for the now-defunct Medellín Cartel

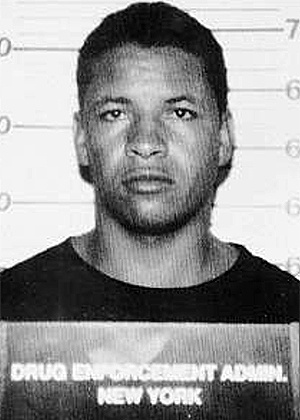
- Born: Dandenys Muñoz Mosquera; August 27, 1965 (age 61); Medellín, Colombia
- Other name: La Quica
- Occupations: Cartel hitman and bodyguard
- Status: Incarcerated
- Convictions: Terrorism, murder, drug trafficking, forgery
- Penalty: 10 consecutive life sentences without the possibility of parole plus 45 years

Details
- Date apprehended: September 25, 1991
- Imprisoned at: USP Atwater

Dandeny Muñoz Mosquera (born August 27, 1965), also known as "La Quica" (Colombian slang for "the fat girl", a childhood nickname), is a former sicario (hitman; paid assassin) for the Colombian Medellín Cartel, a prominent drug trafficking enterprise in Colombia in the late 1980s and early 1990s. He was described at one point as the "chief assassin" for the Cartel's leader Pablo Escobar.

He was believed to be responsible for the deaths of an unknown number of people with official estimates ranging in the hundreds. US authorities currently link him to the deaths of more than 220 people, having supposedly murdered members of both his own organization the Medellín Cartel and the rival Cali Cartel, as well as police officers and government officials. Colombian authorities connect him to the deaths of more than 40 police officers.

Arrested in 1991, he is serving multiple life sentences in a US prison. He was the first person to be convicted under a 1956 federal law that made bombing a civilian aircraft a crime and the 1986 terrorism statute that allows the trial of foreign citizens in the United States if at least one victim was an American citizen. Among his convicted crimes is the 1989 bombing of Avianca Flight 203, which killed 110 civilians.

== Early life ==
Born in Medellín, Muñoz Mosquera's father was a police officer and his mother an evangelist. He was raised in the church. He is believed to have joined the Medellín Cartel in 1978 at the age of twelve after being drawn into the gang by his brother Brance (also known as Tyson due to his resemblance to boxer Mike Tyson) before becoming a gunman in his teens. He was given the nickname "La Quica" (Colombian slang for "the fat girl") from a young age due to his resemblance to his great-aunt. He rose to become one of Pablo Escobar's highest ranking enforcers. However, Muñoz Mosquera has claimed that he joined the Colombian army as a teenager before leaving in 1986 and was jailed on "three or four" occasions on minor theft charges.

In 1991, he was arrested and convicted of being one of the main conspirators in the assassination of New Liberalism founder Luis Carlos Galán, a candidate in the Colombian presidential election set to be held in May 1990. Galán was murdered by an unknown gunman as he took the stage at a political rally to deliver a campaign speech in Soacha. He was jailed in the capital city, Bogotá, but escaped in April 1991 after paying more than $500,000 in bribes, the second time he had escaped from a Colombian prison.

He was wanted in connection with the murder of over 40 police officers in Colombia after Pablo Escobar began offering a $4000 reward for the murder of any officer in Medellín. Colombian authorities also believe that he was directly involved in the bombing at the headquarters of the Administrative Department of Security in December 1989 and a rocket attack on the US Embassy. He was also believed to run a training camp for teenage potential sicarios (hitmen) for the Cartel. He has two children.

== US arrest and subsequent legal actions ==
In September 1991, Muñoz Mosquera travelled to the United States, landing in Miami before travelling to Los Angeles and New York. After federal agents received a tipoff from Colombia, on September 25, 1991, Muñoz Mosquera was arrested along with two other men while using a payphone in the Jackson Heights area of Queens, New York, for traveling with a fake passport. Officials stated that none of the men were armed and offered no resistance when challenged by officers. Muñoz Mosquera initially lied to agents, stating his name as Esteban Restrepo-Echavarria, before his identity was confirmed by fingerprint records provided by Colombian officials. He was presumed to have travelled to the United States on an assassination mission and was held without bail as a result. One of his suspected targets was believed to be Max Mermelstein, a former drug smuggler who had worked for Escobar but had entered witness protection and was expected to implicate Escobar in the murder of Barry Seal.

He was convicted one month later of lying to a federal officer and possessing a fake passport and sentenced to the maximum term of six years in jail. While he was in jail, federal prosecutors claimed that he was a major player in the Medellín Cartel and was responsible for the bombing of Avianca Flight 203 on the orders of Pablo Escobar. On 27 November 1989, the flight took off from El Dorado International Airport in Bogotá bound for Alfonso Bonilla Aragón International Airport in Cali but exploded in mid air minutes after takeoff, killing all 101 passengers and 6 crew members. Although the bombing had occurred in Colombia, he was eligible to be tried by the United States as two passengers on the flight, Carlos Andres Escobí and Astrid del Pilar Gómez, were American citizens.

Muñoz Mosquera was charged with "conspiracy to import and distribute cocaine, substantive importation of cocaine, participating and conspiring to participate in a racketeering enterprise, engaging in a continuing criminal enterprise, various offenses relating to the bombing of a civilian airliner and the extraterritorial murder of two citizens of the United States". His first trial in 1994 lasted two months but was declared a mistrial after the jury were unable to reach a verdict. In his second trial, in the same year, he was convicted on all thirteen counts and sentenced to 10 life sentences plus 45 years in United States Penitentiary, Marion, all to be served consecutively. He became the first person to be convicted under a 1956 Federal law that made bombing a civilian aircraft a crime and the 1986 terrorism statute that allows the trial of foreign citizens in the United States if at least one victim was an American citizen. Before sentencing, Judge Sterling Johnson Jr. commented "Not only are you an evil man, but the things you did, you enjoyed doing." Johnson also stated his belief that Muñoz Mosquera was fortunate that the prosecution had not sought the death penalty as "these acts cry out for the death penalty." Following his conviction, he became one of the first inmates housed at ADX Florence, a supermax prison in Colorado. He is currently incarcerated at United States Penitentiary, Atwater, in California.

While Muñoz Mosquera was convicted of the Avianca bombing, his involvement in the bombing was questioned by Colombian Attorney General Gustavo de Greiff, who sent a letter to Judge Sterling Johnson before the final trial, stating:

I felt necessary to inform you ... with the intention to avoid the miscarriage of justice in the case you have in your hands. We have no evidence linking Mr. Muñoz Mosquera to that attack.

De Greiff was accused by United States officials of being involved financially in the cocaine trade.

The Colombian government initially suspected Gonzalo Rodríguez Gacha a.k.a. "The Mexican". Carlos Mario Alzate had also been blamed for the bombing and had confessed to the crime before Muñoz Mosquera was put on trial.

Many witnesses testified in court about Muñoz Mosquera's brutal acts as a high-ranking member of the Medellín cartel. Many of those witnesses were convicted felons with links to the Medellín and Cali Cartels. Muñoz Mosquera claims that he did not recognize the prosecution's witnesses, and his defense hinged on the insistence that he was a small-time thief and not even a sicario (contract killer), let alone Escobar's chief assassin. He did not deny that his brother Brance, known as "Tyson", later shot dead by Colombian forces, was involved in the Cartel (some, such as the anonymous informant whose tip led to Tyson's death, have claimed was the Medellín "Chief of Security").

== In popular culture ==
- In the original Netflix series Narcos, Muñoz Mosquera is portrayed by Mexican actor Diego Cataño.
- Rapper Nicki Minaj mentions "La Quica" in her 2016 hit "Black Barbies".
- In the 2012 Colombian television series Escobar, El Patrón del Mal, Manuel Viveros portrays the character of Daniel Muñoz 'Quico'.
