= Manuel Alberto Casanova =

Colombian intelligence official

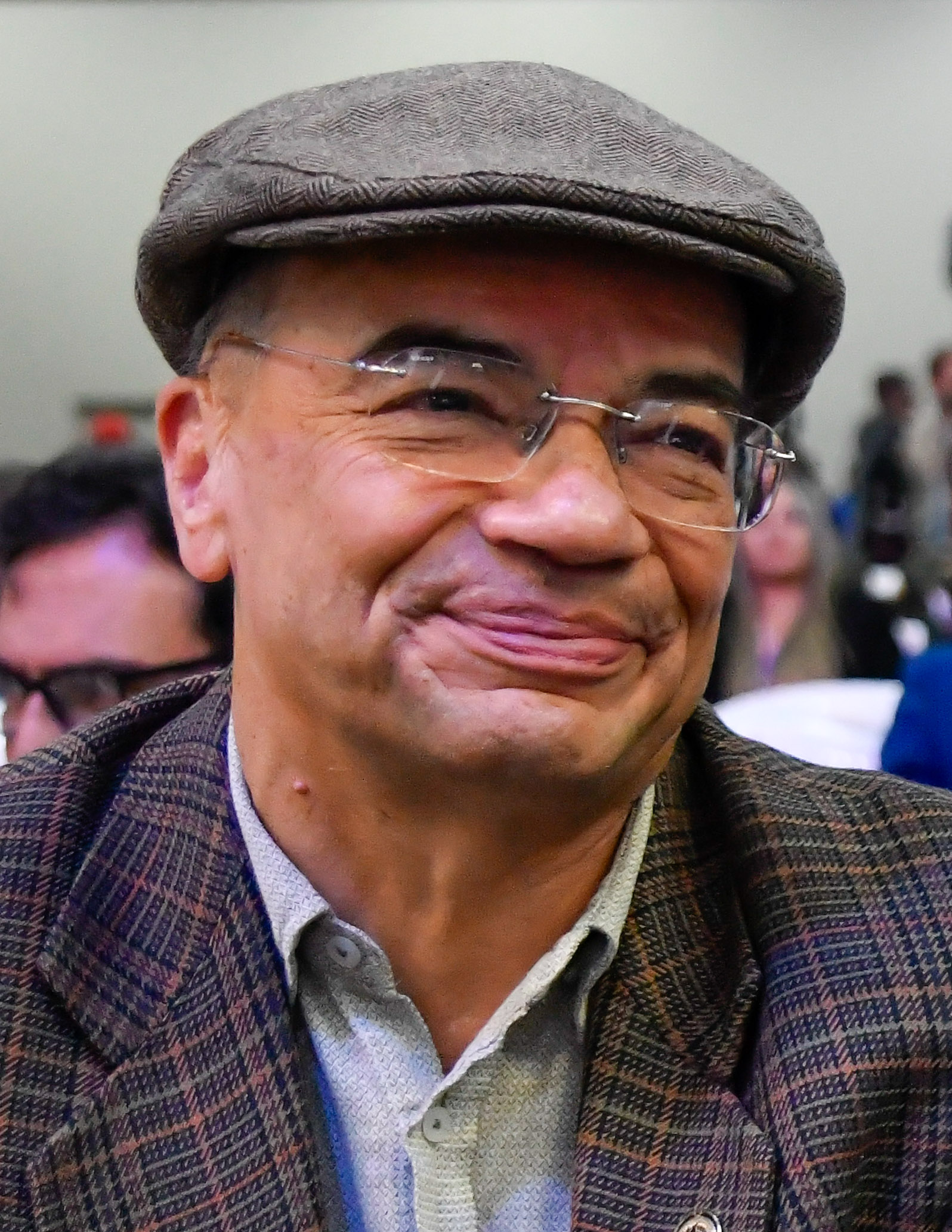
- Casanova in 2023
- Occupation: Intelligence official
- Title: Director Of the National Intelligence Directorate
- Term: 2022 - 2026

Manuel Alberto Casanova is a Colombian government official. He has served as the director of the National Intelligence Directorate, Colombia's main intelligence agency, under President Gustavo Petro, since August 2022, when he replaced Rodolfo Amaya. He is a former member of the 19th of April Movement.
