= La Rochela massacre =

1989 massacre of judicial officials in Simacota, Colombia

- Part of the Colombian conflict
- Location: La Rochela, Simacota, Colombia
- Date: January 18, 1989
- Attack type: Mass shooting
- Deaths: 12
- Injuries: 3
- Convictions: 11
- Litigation: Inter-American Court of Human Rights

The La Rochela massacre occurred on January 18, 1989, at La Rochela, Simacota municipality, Colombia. 15 judicial officials, who were investigating crimes committed in the area, were rounded up and shot by a group of gunmen sent by Rodriguez Gacha. 12 of the officials were killed, while three survived. This was the first of the long series of terror attacks that shook Colombia in 1989, culminating with the November 27 bombing of Avianca Flight 203 and the 6 December DAS Building bombing in Bogotá.

== Legal aftermath ==
In November 1990, nine civilians and two army personnel were sentenced to jail for their role in the La Rochela massacre. In 2007, the State of Colombia was sentenced by the Inter-American Court of Human Rights to pay damages to the relatives of the 12 victims. The international tribunal ruled that the Colombian government had failed to investigate the complicity of state agents in the massacre.

== See also ==
- List of massacres in Colombia
