= Maria del Pilar Hurtado =

María del Pilar Hurtado was the chief of Colombia's Administrative Department of Security under President Álvaro Uribe. After her political asylum in Panama was revoked, she turned herself in to Colombian authorities and was sentenced to 14 years in prison for illegal wiretapping and abusing public office.
