= Jorge Noguera Cotes =

Former director of the Administrative Department of Security of Colombia

Jorge Aurelio Noguera Cotes

Director of the Administrative Department of Security
- In office 16 August 2002 – 26 October 2005
- President: Álvaro Uribe Vélez
- Preceded by: Luis Ernesto Gilibert Vargas
- Succeeded by: Andrés Mauricio Peñate Giraldo

Personal details
- Born: 25 September 1963 (age 63) Santa Marta, Magdalena, Colombia
- Party: Party of the U (2005-2011)
- Other political affiliations: Liberal (-2005)
- Education: Pontifical Xavierian University (LLB, 1988)
- Profession: Lawyer

Jorge Aurelio Noguera Cotes (born 25 September 1963) is a Colombian lawyer, former Director of the Administrative Department of Security (DAS), the intelligence service agency of Colombia and a polemical convicted murderer who served during the direct orders of the president Álvaro Uribe Vélez. A Liberal party politician, he served as regional campaign manager in the Department of Magdalena for then-candidate Álvaro Uribe Vélez during the 2002 presidential elections. After Uribe's victory in the elections, Noguera was appointed Director of the DAS, serving from 2002 to 2005, after which time he was appointed Consul-General if Colombia in Milan in 2006.

On 14 September 2011, the Penal Chamber of the Supreme Court of Colombia found Noguera guilty and sentenced him to 25 years in prison for conspiracy to commit aggravated crime; conspiracy to commit murder; destruction, suppression, and concealment of public documents; and the illegal unauthorized disclosure of secret information and activities, all stemming from his time as Director of the DAS and his involvement in the paramilitary activities of the United Self-Defense Forces of Colombia (AUC) by allowing the DAS to be infiltrated by the AUC.

== Paramilitary infiltration in the DAS ==
Noguera held the position as chair of the DAS throughout Uribe's first term as president, Uribe would later name him as a consul-general in Milan during his second administration as president. Noguera later resigned to his post after the Colombian weekly magazine Semana revealed that judiciary investigations (judicial proceedings held against a plaintiff) linking him to paramilitary groups were currently taking place.

The Colombian parapolitics scandal originated as a result of the detention of former DAS chief of information technology, Rafael García Torres by Colombian authorities. García had been accused of using his position of authority in order to assist paramilitary groups and drug traffickers with extradition orders. Soon after the former allegations were proven to be legitimate, Garcia chose to collaborate with the authorities by identifying several other individuals involved in the corruption allegations making him a key witness in the scandal. One of Garcia's numerous statements mentioned that Noguera Cortes used his position of influence in order to make the resources of the DAS readily available to the paramilitary group AUC which was led at the time by Rodrigo Tovar Pupo, also known by his alias as Jorge 40. In addition to this, Garcia assured the authorities that Noguera personally provided the AUC with the necessary logistics to carry out assassinations against trade unionists throughout the country.

After the former accusations were revealed to the public, Noguera Cotes, who had been strongly backed by Colombian president Alvaro Uribe Velez, resigned to his post as acting consul-general in Milan to stand before judicial authorities. On 22 September 2007 Noguera was arrested under charges of conspiracy to commit crime and murder.

As news of these accusations reached president Uribe, he declared that if Noguera were to be found guilty, he would have to issue an apology to the country for having named him as consul-general. Noguera was named as one of the executive directors for Alvaro Uribe's presidential campaign in the Caribbean coastal department of Magdalena in 2002. One week after his appointment under Uribe's presidential campaign, Noguera was appointed head of the Administrative Department of Security (DAS) for the next four years until his assignation as consul-general in Milan during Uribe's second term as president.

On 23 March 2007, Noguera was released from detention because of procedural flaws after his lawyer was able to prove that (under the provision of the Superior Council of the Judicature of Habeas Corpus), that his client's detention did not take place as specified by law – making Noguera's arrest illegitimate since he was denied of this fundamental right. The case was then passed onto the hands of Attorney General Mario Iguaran, who did not hide his dissatisfaction with the court's decision; Iguaran quickly declared that he would launch an inquiry into the prospective actions that his office could take to counter-act this decision. Noguera was taken into custody for a second time on 6 July 2007, three months after his previous release.

In November 2007, the Attorney General's office dismissed Noguero from his posts and barred him from holding public office for the next 18 years due to his collaboration with the far right-wing paramilitary group AUC. The charges included mismanagement of resources and falsification of data in order to benefit drug trafficking groups.

The prosecutor's office continued to investigate Noguera's case until 11 June 2008 when the Supreme Court of Colombia overturned the Attorney General's office decision since the lead prosecutor, Mario Iguaran named a fiscal officer to lead the investigation against Noguera. This is a task would have been exclusively reserved for Iguaran since under the provision of fuero constitucional, only the country's Attorney General has the ability to investigate the head of the DAS. Noguera was once again released from custody while waiting for yet another trial to be held against him while the Supreme Court sent forth copies of Iguaran's findings to the Commission of Accusations, a committee led by the Chamber of Representatives to investigate the irregularities in the proceedings held against Noguera. On December 12, 2008, Noguera was once again arrested; the public prosecutor's office accuses him of homicide and conspiracy to commit crime. He was sentenced to 25 years in prison on 14 September 2011.

== Personal life ==
Born to Luís Aurelio Noguera and Maruja Cotes Blanco on 25 September 1963 in Santa Marta, Colombia, he graduated from the Colegio San Luis Beltran, and attended the Pontifical Xavierian University in Bogotá where he obtain his Bachelor of Laws in 1988.
