= Latter Day Saint martyrs =

Latter Day Saint martyrs are persons who belonged to The Church of Jesus Christ of Latter-day Saints (LDS Church) or another church within the Latter Day Saint movement who were killed or otherwise persecuted to the point of premature death on account of their religious beliefs, or while performing their religious duties.

Although the term "martyr" is not frequently used in Latter Day Saint terminology, Latter Day Saints recognize a number of prophets, apostles, and other religious persons as recorded in the Bible, including both the Old Testament and New Testament, and Book of Mormon as martyrs within the same religious tradition (albeit at an earlier time) to which they subscribe. For Latter Day Saints, the most notable martyr is Jesus Christ. Other scriptural examples include Abel ("the first martyr"), John the Baptist, James, the brother of John, Stephen whose stoning is recorded in the Book of Acts, Abinadi, women and children of Ammonihah, etc. Latter Day Saints also acknowledge as "Early-day Saint" martyrs those early Christians who were killed for their faith prior to or as a result of the Great Apostasy.

The most notable post-Biblical Latter Day Saint martyrs are Joseph Smith and his brother, Hyrum Smith.

Individuals who die "in the Lord's service" are believed to be rewarded with eternal life: "And whoso layeth down his life in my cause, for my name's sake, shall find it again, even life eternal." Joseph F. Smith, LDS Church president, declared: "I beheld that the faithful elders of this dispensation, when they depart from mortal life, continue their labors in the preaching of the gospel ... in the great world of the spirits."

In 1989, following the death of two LDS Church missionaries in Bolivia, apostle L. Tom Perry noted that from 1831 until 1989, "only seventeen LDS missionaries [were] killed by assassins." Also at that time, apostle M. Russell Ballard "indicated that of the 447,969 missionaries who have served since the days of Joseph Smith, only 525—about one-tenth of 1 percent—have lost their lives through accident, illness, or other causes while serving. 'When you contemplate that number,' he said, 'it appears that the safest place to be in the whole world is on a full-time mission.'"

Missionaries who died from illness or accident are not listed. However, depending on the circumstances of their death, they could be deemed "martyrs" for having died while in religious service.

Many Mormon pioneers and other early church members who suffered privation and early death on account of their religious beliefs would likely qualify as "martyrs." However, they are too numerous to list here. This list also does not include early Mormon settlers who were killed in encounters with Native Americans during the Mormon settlement of the American West.

== List of Latter Day Saint martyrs ==
Death date	Location	Name	Church	Cause of death	Age at death
January 7, 1832	Pomfret, Vermont	Joseph B. Brackenbury (missionary)	Church of Christ	Poisoning	43
November 5, 1833	Battle near the Blue, Jackson, Missouri	Andrew Barber	Church of Christ	Shot in battle [November 4] by Robert Patten - died the next day	17
October 25, 1838	Battle of Crooked River, Missouri	Gideon Carter	Church of Jesus Christ of Latter Day Saints	Killed in battle	
October 25, 1838	Battle of Crooked River, Missouri	Patrick O'Banion	Church of Jesus Christ of Latter Day Saints	Killed in battle by John Lockhart	
October 25, 1838	Battle of Crooked River, Missouri	David W. Patten (apostle)	Church of Jesus Christ of Latter Day Saints	Killed in battle	39
December 1838	Haun's Mill, Missouri	Hiram Abbott	Church of Jesus Christ of Latter Day Saints	Massacre; died in December 1838 from wounds	25
October 30, 1838	Haun's Mill, Missouri	Elias Benner Sr.	Church of Jesus Christ of Latter Day Saints	Massacre	43
October 30, 1838	Haun's Mill, Missouri	John Byers	Church of Jesus Christ of Latter Day Saints	Massacre	
October 30, 1838	Haun's Mill, Missouri	Alexander Campbell	Church of Jesus Christ of Latter Day Saints	Massacre	
October 31, 1838	Haun's Mill, Missouri	Simon Cox	Church of Jesus Christ of Latter Day Saints	Massacre; mortally wounded and lived until the next morning	
October 30, 1838	Haun's Mill, Missouri	Josiah Fuller	Church of Jesus Christ of Latter Day Saints	Massacre	35
October 30, 1838	Haun's Mill, Missouri	Austin Hammer Sr.	Church of Jesus Christ of Latter Day Saints	Massacre	34
October 30, 1838	Haun's Mill, Missouri	John Lee	Church of Jesus Christ of Latter Day Saints	Massacre	
October 30, 1838	Haun's Mill, Missouri	Benjamin Franklin Lewis	Church of Jesus Christ of Latter Day Saints	Massacre; shot by Mr. Rockholt, lived a few hours	35
October 30, 1838	Haun's Mill, Missouri	Thomas White McBride (justice of the peace)	Church of Jesus Christ of Latter Day Saints	Massacre; shot in chest by Jacob Rogers with his own gun; head and body hacked with a corn knife	62
November 1838	Haun's Mill, Missouri	Charles Merrick (from Kirtland Camp)	Church of Jesus Christ of Latter Day Saints	Massacre; died 25 November 1838 from wounds	9
October 30, 1838	Haun's Mill, Missouri	Levi Newton Merrick (from Kirtland Camp)	Church of Jesus Christ of Latter Day Saints	Massacre	30
October 30, 1838	Haun's Mill, Missouri	William Napier Sr.	Church of Jesus Christ of Latter Day Saints	Massacre	43
October 30, 1838	Haun's Mill, Missouri	George Spencer Richards (from Kirtland Camp)	Church of Jesus Christ of Latter Day Saints	Massacre	15
October 30, 1838	Haun's Mill, Missouri	Sardius Washington Smith (from Kirtland Camp)	Church of Jesus Christ of Latter Day Saints	Massacre; top of skull blown off from musket shot by William Reynolds	10
October 30, 1838	Haun's Mill, Missouri	Warren Smith (from Kirtland Camp)	Church of Jesus Christ of Latter Day Saints	Massacre	44
October 31, 1838	Haun's Mill, Missouri	John York Jr.	Church of Jesus Christ of Latter Day Saints	Massacre; mortally wounded and died the next day	62
May 27, 1840	Nauvoo, Illinois	Edward Partridge (bishop)	Church of Jesus Christ of Latter Day Saints	Persecution	46
August 20, 1840	Nauvoo, Illinois	Marietta Carter Holmes	Church of Jesus Christ of Latter Day Saints	Mob attack in her home Note, it is disputed if a mob attack even occurred for Joseph Johnston claims there are no national news articles at the time, as was done for violence perpetrated against Mormons in 1840. Additionally, John Smith, uncle of the prophet, listed her cause of death as disease.	20
June 27, 1844	Carthage Jail, Illinois	Joseph Smith, Jr.	Church of Jesus Christ of Latter Day Saints	Mob assassination	38
June 27, 1844	Carthage Jail, Illinois	Hyrum Smith	Church of Jesus Christ of Latter Day Saints	Mob assassination	44
July 30, 1844	Nauvoo, Illinois	Samuel Harrison Smith (one of Eight Witnesses)	Church of Jesus Christ of Latter Day Saints	Attributed to internal injuries sustained while fleeing a mob on horseback on the day his brothers were murdered	36
November 15, 1845	Hancock County, Illinois	Edmund Durfee	LDS Church	shot in the back by arsonists	57
July 9, 1856	St. James Township, Beaver Island, Michigan	James Strang (president of the church)	Church of Jesus Christ of Latter Day Saints (Strangite)	Shot on June 16, 1856 by Thomas Bedford, a member who Strang had had flogged for adultery; Strang died in Voree, Wisconsin	43
May 13, 1857	near Van Buren, Arkansas	Parley P. Pratt (apostle)	LDS Church	Shot and stabbed by Hector McLean, the ex-husband of one of Pratt's plural wives	50
July 21, 1879	Varnell, Georgia	Joseph Standing (missionary)	LDS Church	Mob murder	24
August 10, 1884	Cane Creek, Tennessee	William S. Berry (missionary)	LDS Church	Mob assassination	46
August 10, 1884	Cane Creek, Tennessee	John H. Gibbs (missionary)	LDS Church	Mob assassination	32
August 10, 1884	Cane Creek, Tennessee	W. Martin Conder	LDS Church	Mob assassination	20
August 10, 1884	Cane Creek, Tennessee	John Riley Hutson	LDS Church	Mob assassination	27
May 1898	Sanderson, Florida	George P. Canova	LDS Church	Shot and killed	
May 4, 1912	Diaz, Galeana, Chihuahua, Mexico	James D. Harvey	LDS Church	Shot and killed	49
August 27, 1912	Colonia Pacheco, Mexico	Joshua Stevens	LDS Church	Killed by Mexican rebels	
1915	San Marcos, Hidalgo, Mexico	Rafael Monroy (branch president)	LDS Church	Execution by Liberation Army of the South	
1915	San Marcos, Hidalgo, Mexico	Vicente Morales	LDS Church	Execution by Liberation Army of the South	
August 20, 1972	Ensenada, Baja California, Mexico	Joel LeBaron (president of the church)	Church of the Firstborn of the Fulness of Times	Shot and killed by Daniel Jordan on the orders of Ervil LeBaron, Joel's brother and a rival fundamentalist Mormon leader	49
October 1974	Austin, Texas	Gary Darley (missionary)	LDS Church	Murder by an unidentified individual (Robert Elmer Kleason was convicted for the crime but his conviction was later overturned); presumably dismembered with chainsaw	20
October 1974	Austin, Texas	Mark Fischer (missionary)	LDS Church	Murder by an unidentified individual (Robert Elmer Kleason was convicted for the crime but his conviction was later overturned); presumably dismembered with chainsaw	19
May 10, 1977	Murray, Utah	Rulon C. Allred (head of church)	Apostolic United Brethren	Shot and killed by Rena Chynoweth and another woman on orders of Ervil LeBaron, a rival fundamentalist Mormon	71
December 15, 1979	North Charleston, South Carolina	Elizabeth King (missionary)	LDS Church	Found beaten and shot to death in a car in a parking lot	66
December 15, 1979	North Charleston, South Carolina	Ruth Teuscher (missionary)	LDS Church	Found beaten and shot to death in a car in a parking lot	65
February 1987	Lisbon, Portugal	Roger Hunt (missionary)	LDS Church	Shot and killed by a security guard who thought he had stolen a car	19
May 24, 1989	La Paz, Bolivia	Todd Ray Wilson (missionary)	LDS Church	Assassination in terrorist attack by Zarate Willka Armed Forces of Liberation	20
May 24, 1989	La Paz, Bolivia	Jeffrey Brent Ball (missionary)	LDS Church	Assassination in terrorist attack by Zarate Willka Armed Forces of Liberation	20
May 27, 1990	Dublin, Ireland	Gale Stanley Critchfield (missionary)	LDS Church	Stabbed to death	20
August 22, 1990	Huancayo, Peru	Manuel Antonio Hidalgo (missionary)	LDS Church	Assassination in terrorist attack by Tupac Amaru Revolutionary Movement	22
August 22, 1990	Huancayo, Peru	Cristian Andreani Ugarte (missionary)	LDS Church	Assassination in terrorist attack by Tupac Amaru Revolutionary Movement	21
March 6, 1991	Tarma, Peru	Oscar Zapata (missionary)	LDS Church	Shot and killed after getting off a bus	20
October 17, 1998	Ufa, Russia	José Manuel Mackintosh (missionary)	LDS Church	Stabbed outside the lobby of a building where he and his companion had been visiting Church members	21
April 24, 1999	Abidjan, Ivory Coast	Jonathan Philip Barrett (missionary)	LDS Church	Stabbed while walking to a teaching appointment.	19
January 2, 2006	Chesapeake, Virginia	Morgan W. Young (missionary)	LDS Church	Fatal shooting	23
August 29, 2010	Visalia, California	Clay R. Sannar (bishop)	LDS Church	Killed by an ex-member of the church while performing his duties as bishop.	40

== See also ==
- Anti-Mormonism
- Death of Joseph Smith
- Haun's Mill massacre
- Missouri Executive Order 44
- Mormon War (1838)
- Mormonism and violence
- Persecution
- Religious discrimination
- Religious persecution

== Notes ==
- History of the Church, Volume 1
- Mormon Redress Petitions
- Sacred places : a comprehensive guide to early LDS historical sites, Volume four, Missouri, LaMar C. Berrett, general editor; Max H. Parkin, pp. 105–6.
