= DAS Building bombing =

1989 bomb attack in Bogotá, Colombia

Coordinates: 4.615231°N 74.086708°W

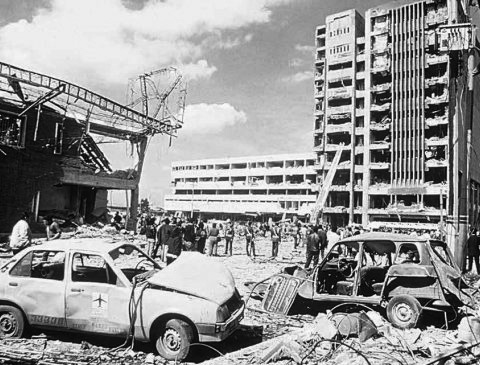
- Location: Bogotá, Colombia
- Date: December 6, 1989; 7:30 a.m. (COT)
- Target: Administrative Department of Security (DAS)
- Attack type: Truck bombing Attempted assassination
- Weapon: Dynamite modified time bomb
- Deaths: 63
- Injuries: ~2,248
- Motive: Attempt to assassinate Miguel Maza Márquez

The DAS Building bombing was a truck bomb attack in Bogotá, Colombia, at 7:30 am on December 6, 1989, targeting the Administrative Department of Security (DAS) headquarters.

A truck parked near the building exploded, killing 57 people instantly and injuring 2,248. The bomb blast, an estimated 9,000 kg of dynamite, destroyed 14 city blocks and destroyed more than 300 commercial properties. The last victim of the bombing died on April 27, 1990. It was the deadliest car bomb attack in Latin America before being succeeded by the AMIA bombing 5 years later. It is widely believed that the Medellín Cartel was responsible for the attack, in an attempt to assassinate DAS director Miguel Maza Márquez, who escaped unharmed. The same group was believed to be behind the bombing of Avianca Flight 203 9 days before.

The DAS Building bombing was the last in the long series of attacks that targeted Colombian politicians, officials, and journalists in 1989, which started with the January 18 killing of 12 judicial officials in Simacota.

== See also ==
- Terrorism in Colombia
