= Simacota =

Coordinates: 6°27′N 73°20′W

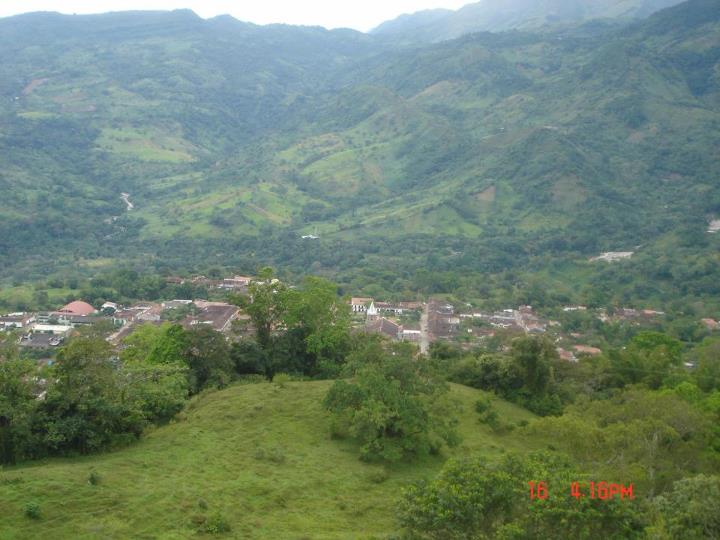
- View of Simacota

- Flag

- Location of the town and municipality of Simacota in the Santander Department.
- Country: Colombia
- Department: Santander

Government
  - Mayor (Alcalde): Severiano Cala Cala (2008-2011)

Area
  - Total: 1,413 km^{2} (546 sq mi)

Population
  - Total: 7,845
- Website: www.simacota-santander.gov.co

Simacota is a town and municipality in the Santander Department in northeastern Colombia. In 1965, the city had briefly been invaded by more than 100 members of the anti-government Ejército de Liberación Nacional (ELN), the "National Liberation Army") and "captured the public imagination" in its first act as a new guerrilla organization. The invaders murdered three of Simacota's four policemen, robbed the local bank, harassed the townspeople and looted the local pharmacy of its medicines, before being driven out by the Colombian Army. Only three of the 100 ELN men were captured. In 1989, Simacota was the site of the La Rochela massacre, where 15 judicial officials were targeted by gunmen sent by the Medellín Cartel leader José Gonzalo Rodríguez Gacha.
