= Miguel Maza Márquez =

Colombian general

General Miguel Alfredo Maza Márquez (born 1942 in Santa Marta, Magdalena) is a retired Colombian general, who was director of the Administrative Department of Security (DAS) from 1985 to 1991.

On May 30, 1989, a bombing attempt on his life left four dead and 37 wounded. In December 1989, he survived another attempted assassination by Pablo Escobar's Medellin Cartel, the DAS Building bombing which killed 63 people.

In November 2016, the Colombian Supreme Court sentenced him to 30 years in prison for his participation in the assassination of liberal Presidential candidate Luis Carlos Galán in August 1989.
