= Zarate Willka Armed Forces of Liberation =

Bolivian guerrilla group during the 1980s

- Fuerzas Armadas de Liberación Zarate Willka (FAL-ZW)
- Dates active: c. 1985–1991
- Active regions: La Paz, Bolivia
- Ideology: Marxism–Leninism; Indigenism; Foquismo; Katarismo

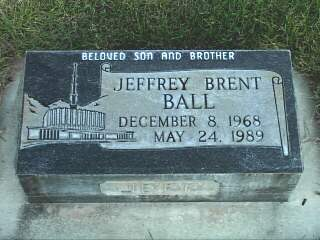
Gravestone of Jeffrey Brent Ball in Coalville, Utah

Zarate Willka Armed Forces of Liberation (Fuerzas Armadas de Liberación Zárate Willca) was a Bolivian guerrilla group which was organized about 1985 and surfaced with a series of bombings, assassinations, and attempted assassinations in La Paz, Bolivia, during 1988 and 1989.

== History ==
They claimed responsibility for an assassination attempt on United States Secretary of State George P. Shultz in August 1988, the bombing of the Bolivian Parliament in December 1988, another bombing which caused a local blackout, the bombing of a Mormon meetinghouse, the slaying of two American Mormon missionaries on May 24, 1989, and the bombing of the US Embassy in a failed attempt to assassinate US Ambassador Robert S. Gelbard on December 20, 1989. By 1991, most members of the group had been apprehended, tried, convicted and imprisoned, and the organization was effectively disbanded.

The group was named after Pablo Zárate, known as Willka, who died in 1905 after leading a large Indian rebellion.

== See also ==
- Latter Day Saint martyrs
- Nestor Paz Zamora Commission
