= National Intelligence Directorate (Colombia) =

National intelligence agency of Colombia

- Dirección Nacional de Inteligencia; DNI
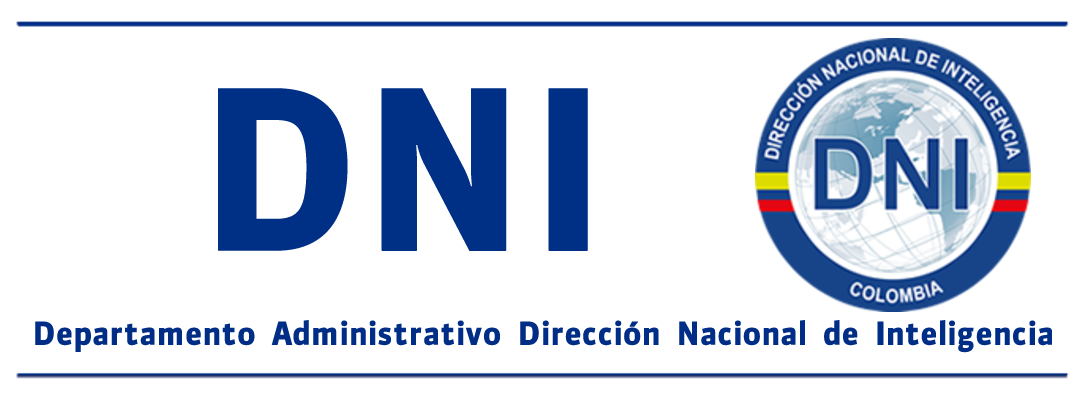

Agency overview
- Formed: 4 November 2011; 14 years ago
- Preceding agency: Administrative Department of Security
- Jurisdiction: Government of Colombia
- Employees: Classified
- Annual budget: Classified
- Agency executive: Director General
- Parent agency: Presidency of Colombia
- Website: www.dni.gov.co

The National Intelligence Directorate (Spanish: Dirección Nacional de Inteligencia; DNI) is the main intelligence agency of Colombia. It is the successor organization to the Administrative Department of Security (DAS) which was tasked with providing internal and external intelligence, law enforcement and immigration control. The agency reports solely to the President of Colombia, and is currently led by retired Admiral Rodolfo Amaya.

In November 2011, President Juan Manuel Santos announced that he would be dissolving the Administrative Department of Security after the agency went through various scandals involving agents spying on politicians and judges. Aside from the scandals, the creation of the DNI was incentivised by the need to revamp the intelligence services, and decentralise power among the security and intelligence institutions in Colombia. The DNI unlike its predecessor organisation the DAS, does not take part in Law Enforcement activities, nor does it control the border and immigration services. Its main task is Intelligence both domestic and abroad, and counter intelligence. Its strategic vision was laid out in 2011, with the aim of becoming a leader in the production and analysis of strategic intelligence and counter intelligence in the national and international realm by 2019. One practical aspect towards reaching this goal has been to diversify its recruitment pool by providing more professional career pathways for individuals with no military or police background.
