= 2018 Oruro attacks =

Explosions in Oruro, Bolivia

- 2018 Oruro attacks (Bolivia)
- Location: Oruro, Oruro Department, Bolivia
- Date: 10–13 February 2018; 18:45–18:57 (AST)
- Attack type: Provoked explosions
- Weapons: First explosion: Dynamite with hydrogel Second explosion: Dynamite mixed with ANFO
- Deaths: 12
- Injuries: +49
- Assailants: Unknown, Juan Carlos Herrera Beltrán is the main suspect of the first explosion.
- Motive: Unknown

On 10 February 2018, an explosion occurred in the afternoon in the Bolivian city of Oruro during the traditional carnival of the city. At a street food stand, eight people were killed by an explosion near the main street of Oruro. At first, it was thought that it was the explosion of a gas canister due to mishandling, but after no fragments were found of the alleged canister or a gas leak that caused it, the government discarded this theory. The explosion also left more than forty people injured.

Three days later, another attack occurred at 18:57. Approximately three kilos of dynamite mixed with ANFO were used, which were detonated a short distance from the first explosion. The explosion caused the death of four persons, two of them children, and left nine people injured.

The culprits of both explosions are unknown, but several people were detained. Three suspects who were at the site of the second explosion were arrested the following day, but later it was discovered that they had no relation at all with the event. Another suspect of the first explosion remained detained since 27 March 2018. They were the most serious explosive attacks in Bolivian history.

== Aftermath ==
=== First explosion ===
Initially, the first detonation was attributed to the mishandling of a gas canister from a food stall installed in the street, but this was ruled out upon the announcement of the second explosion, which caused the conclusion of the investigation of the first explosion to be reviewed. It was discovered that the weapons used were 3 kilos of dynamite with hydrogel. It is thought that this dynamite was placed next to a carafe of liquefied petroleum gas with the intention of exploiting it. All the victims belonged to the same family, so it is possible that there were interests involved and that it was a targeted killing.

It was requested that the nearby houses and businesses deliver the filmings of between February 10 and 12 as a result of the non-functioning of the security cameras due to flaw.

The culprit is not known, but a suspect has been arrested, Juan Carlos Herrera Beltrán. He was arrested by the police on 27 March 2018 thanks to the recordings obtained by volunteers who offered to help. According to studies, it has been determined that the explosives were placed in a blue container placed in the middle of the victims, which implies that it was an attack directed at these people. It has also been claimed that Herrera left the place minutes before the attack. In the recordings, it was observed how Herrera did not help his wife when she was still alive. Herrera was remanded in custody. It is suspected that the crime is passionate, since he maintained a loving relationship with his sister-in-law, Amanda Balderrama.

Three days after the first explosion, the second would take place.

=== Second explosion ===
The Bolivian Police assured that there is no risk of a new attack and that there is a device deployed in the city. It has been criticized that the government did not exercise any preventive measure and that the second explosion would have been avoided had it not been for their ineptitude. Three suspects who were in the explosion site were arrested the following day, of which two of them circulated in a vehicle that presented damage presumably produced by explosives. Later, it was discovered that they were not related to the attack and that they were separated at the time of the explosion, but they continued to be detained because of the possession of illegal weapons. The explosion caused the death of four persons, two of them under-ages, and left nine people injured.

The Bolivian authorities classified the event as a terrorist attack, too. It has been suggested that the explosion was caused by a gas leak, but due to the dimensions of the crater, that has been ruled out. The general commander of the Bolivian Police, Faustino Mendoza, declared that they had found the remains of a detonator for more than 3 kilos of dynamite.

The company YPFB, a state-owned oil and gas company, cut the supply of gas in the area and verified that there was no gas leak, while conveying condolences to the families of the victims, action that also made the President Evo Morales.

The places where both explosions occurred remain closed. Several parents decided not to send their children to school the next day. Many schools did not teach, and those that did were under strong police protection. Other people did not leave their homes because of the fear of being victims of a new explosion. Morales offers an amount of 150,000 bolivianos for all who of reliable information about the authors.

In social networks, a lot of false information was spread like other alleged explosions or armed people in the street. Mendoza condemned these acts and called disinformation as part of terrorism.
