= Administrative Department of Security =

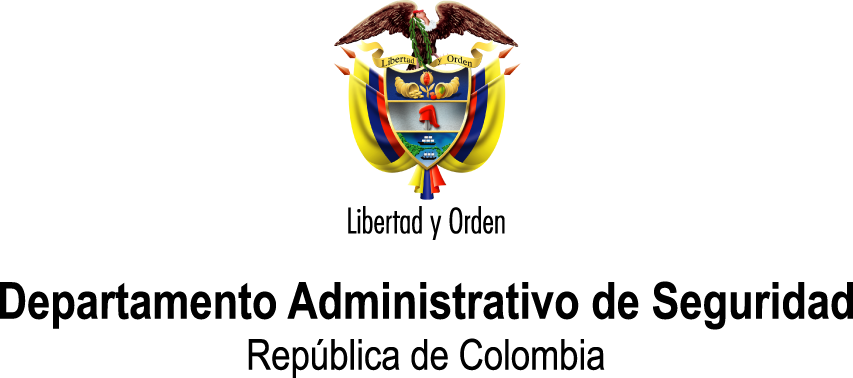
- Motto: Lealtad, Valor, Honradez; Loyalty, Valor, Honesty

Agency overview
- Formed: 18 July 1960
- Preceding agencies: Departamento Administrativo del Servicio de Inteligencia Colombiano; Migración Colombia
- Dissolved: 31 October 2011
- Superseding agency: National Intelligence Directorate (Colombia) (DNI)
- Employees: 6,800
- Annual budget: COP$263,853,350,000 (est. 2010)

Jurisdictional structure
- National agency: Colombia
- Operations jurisdiction: Colombia
- Constituting instrument: Decree 1717 of 1960
- General nature: Civilian police

Operational structure
- Overseen by: Inspector General of Colombia; Controller General of Colombia
- Headquarters: Cra 28 No. 17 A-00 (Paloquemao); Bogotá, D.C., Colombia; 4°36′54″N 74°5′14″W
- Agency executives: Felipe Muñoz Gómez, Director; Jaime Andrés Polanco Barreto, Deputy Director
- Child agencies: Academia Superior de Inteligencia y Seguridad Pública; Fondo Rotatorio del Departamento Administrativo de Seguridad

Notables
- Programme: DAS Most Wanted Terrorists

Website
- www.das.gov.co

The Administrative Department of Security (Spanish: Departamento Administrativo de Seguridad, DAS) was the security service agency of Colombia, which was also responsible for border and immigration services. It was dissolved on 31 October 2011 as part of a wider Executive Reform, and was replaced by the Dirección Nacional de Inteligencia (DNI).

== Activities ==
DAS was tasked with providing security to state institutions and VIPs, providing judiciary police investigative services and serving as a counter-intelligence service to both external and internal threats. At DAS, citizens and foreigners living in Colombia could obtain their background records, a common requirement for a variety of transactions and services involving both state and private institutions. In addition, DAS was responsible for immigration control and the issuance of visas.

Public law 218 of 2000, at section 38, states that all employees of DAS were intelligence agents. DAS worked with the Drug Enforcement Administration (DEA), an agency of the US government tasked with combating the trade of illegal narcotics.

== History ==
The events that followed Jorge Eliécer Gaitán's assassination in 1948 provoked a violent riot in Bogotá, now known as the Bogotazo, which also started a further ten years of violence in all of Colombia known in Colombian history as La Violencia. These events also brought in a Military Government headed by General Gustavo Rojas Pinilla. Within the policies implemented by this Government was the creation, by means of Presidential Decree 2872 of 1953, of an administrative department known as the Colombian Administrative Department of Intelligence Services, (SIC). This department was in charge of Internal and External Intelligence and was created with the purpose of having an agency within the framework of the State to handle matters of intelligence, security and Constitutional enforcement.

President Alberto Lleras Camargo changed the course of the SIC when he issued the Decree 1717 of 18 July 1960, substituting the SIC with the Departamento Administrativo de Seguridad (DAS), or Administrative Department of Security.

The functions of the DAS were laid out by means of Decree 512 of 1989, passed during the administration of President Virgilio Barco Vargas. The DAS formally became the Security Organization of the State as an official, technical, professional and apolitical institution during the administration of President César Gaviria Trujillo, by means of Decree 2110 of 1992.

During the administration of President Andrés Pastrana Arango and in compliance with the State Reform brought on by Law 489 of 1998, the Decrees 218 of 2000, and 1272 of 2000 modified the structure of the DAS, giving the DAS the same parameters, privileges and flexibility of a State Government Ministry.

=== 1989 Headquarters Bombing ===
On December 6, 1989, at 7:30 AM, the Medellín Cartel detonated a bus loaded with 1,100 pounds (500 kg) of explosives directly in front of the headquarters building in downtown Bogotá. The explosion left 49 dead, 600 wounded and hundreds of retail outlets completely destroyed. It is the deadliest terrorist bombing in the history of Colombia after the bombing of Avianca Flight 203. It was also the second time the cartel attempted to kill DAS director Miguel Maza Márquez using an explosive device; the first attack on May 30, 1989, left four dead and 37 wounded.

=== Scandals ===
Members of DAS have been previously accused of interacting with left-wing guerrillas, right-wing paramilitary, drug dealers and smugglers, among others.

In October 2005, the content of a tape arguably containing a conversation between Special Intelligence Group Director Enrique Ariza and other DAS members, apparently discussing plans to create an intelligence office with financing from illegal paramilitary groups, was published in the Colombian press. Unspecified sources accused vice-director José Miguel Narváez of allegedly leaking this tape as part of a setup in order to discredit DAS Director Jorge Noguera. Director Noguera resigned and Narváez was removed from command.

Subsequently, Andrés Peñate was selected as the new DAS Director, together with the announcement of polygraph tests for DAS personnel and the creation of a commission tasked with proposing reforms and a restructuring of the DAS.

Between January and March 2006, new allegations came to light about DAS-paramilitary relations and former Director Noguera's potential involvement. President Uribe publicly asked Noguera to appear before the Attorney General's office, but Noguera refused alleging economic and security reasons. Noguera was then acting Consul in Milan, Italy. He later resigned, returned to the country and appeared before judicial authorities. On February 22, 2007, Noguera was arrested, accused of having ties to paramilitaries.

On June 11, 2008, the Colombian Supreme Court ordered the immediate release of Jorge Noguera. According to the José Alvear Restrepo Lawyers' Collective, Noguera was only released due to procedural defects; however the charges against him, conspiracy to commit a crime, misuse of authority through an arbitrary and unjust act, and improper use of classified or secret information, may still be prosecuted.

On October 24, 2008, the head of the DAS Maria del Pilar Hurtado stepped down from her post after allegations that the agency had conducted surveillance on Senator Gustavo Petro and other left-wing political opponents of President Álvaro Uribe Vélez. The incident has been dubbed The Colombian Watergate, in reference to the Watergate scandal in the United States involving President Richard Nixon and wiretapping. The allegations were later admitted to be true after some internal memos were anonymously received by Senator Petro. One ordered that information be gathered on Petro's "contacts with people who offer to testify against the government.". Hurtado said that she at no time had received or given any instructions linked to the incidents that were made public, and that she was stepping down to preserve the honour of the agency. She was under political asylum in the country of Panama and has been requested in extradition by the Colombian Government after having undergone Justice trial. Panama has declined the extradition to this date. She turned herself in on February 6, 2015, at the Colombian Embassy in Panama. As of February 16, 2015, she is in prison and awaiting trial in Colombia.

President Uribe made Joaquín Polo Montalvo the subdirector of DAS the new acting director.

=== Dissolution ===
In late 2011, President Juan Manuel Santos announced that DAS was to be replaced by a new agency, the national intelligence agency (ANIC, in Spanish). The purpose of the new agency would be solely to gather intelligence. The additional functions under the purview of DAS, namely immigration and security protocols, were distributed to the Ministry of Foreign Relations and the Ministry of the Interior.

== See also ==
- Colombian conflict
- List of intelligence agencies
- List of terrorist incidents
- Colombian parapolitics scandal
