= Néstor Paz Zamora Commission =

Militant Bolivian Marxist–Leninist organization

- Comisión Néstor Paz Zamora
- Dates active: ~1989–October 1990
- Active regions: La Paz, Bolivia
- Ideology: Marxism–Leninism; Guevarism; Foquismo

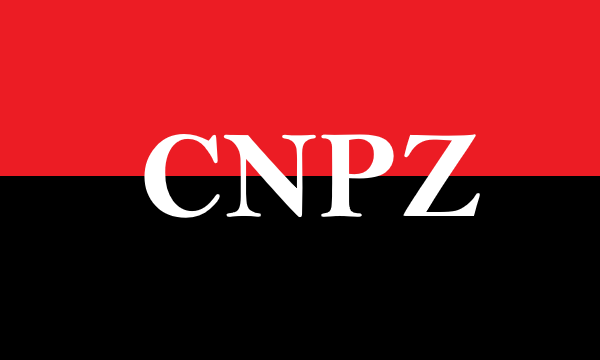
Logo of Comisión Néstor Paz Zamora

The Nestor Paz Zamora Commission (Spanish: Comision Nestor Paz Zamora, CNPZ) was a militant Bolivian Marxist–Leninist organization which became publicly known in October 1990. It was named after Nestor Paz Zamora, the brother of Jaime Paz Zamora, who was then the president of Bolivia. Nestor Paz Zamora had participated in the 1970 guerrilla insurgency at Teoponte.

== Kidnapping ==
On June 11, 1990, members of the group kidnapped businessman Jorge Lonsdale, the manager of the Vascal bottling firm (a Coca-Cola distributor), shareholder in La Razón newspaper, and member of La Paz's Club Social. Lonsdale's family members and the authorities were initially unaware that his kidnapping was the act of a political organization rather an ordinary attempt to extract ransom.

Members of the group publicized its existence with graffiti bearing its initials and the phrase Bolivia digna y soberana (Bolivia dignified and sovereign) in August 1990. The group first gained international attention following an attack on the marine guardhouse at the United States embassy in October 1990. During the October attack a police guard was shot dead.

On December 4, police with the Centro Especial de Investigaciones Policiales (CEIP) captured Evaristo Salazar, one of two members of the Peruvian Túpac Amaru Revolutionary Movement operating within the CNPZ, during a sting operation in which Lonsdale's family promised to deliver ransom. Bolivian police fatally tortured Salazar, discovered the location where the group was keeping Lonsdale, and finally shot him later that night.

During a police operation to retrieve Lonsdale, the kidnapped businessman and three CNPZ guerrillas were killed by gunshots, while two other CNPZ members were captured alive. A forensic report indicates that at least one of the guerrillas, Italian national Michael Nothdurfter, was shot at close range in an apparent execution.
