= Assassinations of Jeffrey Brent Ball and Todd Ray Wilson =

Murder of two Missionaries of the Church of Jesus Christ of Latter-day Saints

- Location: 856 José María Achá Street (near Avenida Baptista), Garita de Lima neighborhood, La Paz, Bolivia
- Date: May 24, 1989; 10:20 p.m. (Bolivia Time (BOT))
- Target: Jeffrey Brent Ball and Todd Ray Wilson
- Weapon: 9 mm machine gun
- Deaths: 2; Jeffrey Brent Ball and Todd Ray Wilson
- Perpetrator: Zarate Willka Armed Forces of Liberation
- Motive: Political statement against the perceived violations of the national sovereignty of Bolivia by the United States

Elders Jeffrey Brent Ball and Todd Ray Wilson, two American missionaries of the Church of Jesus Christ of Latter-day Saints (LDS Church) were killed in La Paz, Bolivia on May 24, 1989, by members of the Fuerzas Armadas de Liberación-Zarate Willka terrorist group who associated them and the church they represented with perceived American imperialist activities. Later, three Peruvians, Elders Manuel Hidalgo, Cristian Ugarte, and Oscar Zapata were killed in Peru for similar reasons on August 22, 1990, and March 6, 1991.

Government officials of both the United States and Bolivia employed their resources in bringing the assassins to justice, and the accused assassins suffered deprivations to their persons and families, including the murder of a brother.

Some assassinations of missionaries are because of anti-Mormon hostility, some are due to political reasons, and some are simply random attacks. The LDS Church views slain missionaries as martyrs. Their names "will be engraved forever in the history of this Church as those who lived as faithful servants of God and died as martyrs to His eternal work."

The circumstances surrounding the politically motivated assassinations of Ball and Wilson affected people of many different groups. As one sister of Wilson expressed over ten years later, "It is something you never forget."

== Elders Ball and Wilson ==
Jeffrey Brent Ball was born December 8, 1968, the second of three children born to Alfred Brent Ball and Lois Joyce Bates Ball of Wanship, outside Coalville, Utah, who operated the Rafter-B Gas 'N Grub as a family business. Jeffrey was a stockily built athlete and an all-state American football player for three consecutive years, acting as the varsity team captain for two of those years. He was also active in student politics at North Summit High School in Coalville, where he served as student body vice president. His older sister, Wendy, described him as "a powerful authority who also had a caring soft side he tried to hide but couldn't." His desire to serve a mission was manifested by his selling his Jeep that he "dearly loved" to finance it. He entered the Missionary Training Center (MTC) in June 1988, and served at the same time as his sister, who labored in the Guatemala Guatemala City North Mission. Their eighteen-year-old brother Greg was preparing to serve a mission as well.

Todd Ray Wilson was born May 5, 1969. He was the seventh of ten children born to mine electrician Arvil Ray Wilson and his wife Elaine Bunderson Wilson of Wellington, a small town about five miles southeast of Price, Utah. He had been an honor student at Carbon High School, and had begun attending the College of Eastern Utah, while working as the night manager at Wendy's Restaurant in Price. Todd had a friendly, gregarious personality and an exceptional academic aptitude, especially excelling in accounting. In order to save more money for his mission, he dropped his classes and continued to work late at night. He had "looked forward to his mission above all else." He was the third of his siblings to serve a full time mission for the Church of Jesus Christ. Todd entered the MTC in July 1988. At the time of his death, his brother Brad was preparing to depart for his mission. Brad left just 3 months after Todd’s death and served in the Spain, Seville mission. His youngest brother, James, later served a mission in Eastern Canada.

== Terrorism in Bolivia ==
When Jeffrey Ball and Todd Wilson arrived in Bolivia in 1988, they entered an environment of severe political unrest and anti-Mormon antagonism in the nation and in Latin America generally. The first violent attacks against the LDS Church occurred in Colombia in 1983 where two meetinghouses were bombed eight times. Between 1984 and 1989, targets of the LDS Church in Latin America were hit by terrorists sixty-two times. The majority of these attacks (46) occurred in Chile, though five attacks took place in Bolivia. The LDS Church in Latin America was attacked in this period more frequently than any other American-based bank, business, church, or other institution.

One group that specifically targeted the LDS Church in Bolivia was known as the Fuerzas Armadas de Liberación Zarate Willka (Zarate Willka Armed Forces of Liberation, hereafter referred to as FAL Zarate Willka), named for a nineteenth century Indian hero. FAL Zarate Willka was a relatively unknown terrorist group apparently formed around 1985. It first surfaced in August 1988 in connection with a failed attack on former US Secretary of State George Shultz, who was in La Paz for talks with government officials. A bomb exploded near his motorcade, but no one was hurt. The group later claimed responsibility for an attack on the Bolivian Parliament and caused a blackout in La Paz with another bombing. Later that year on December 20, 1989, protesting American intervention in Panama, they attacked the U.S. Embassy in a failed attempt to assassinate U.S. Ambassador Robert Gelbard.

This group had previously assaulted the LDS Church on several occasions. At one point, not long before the assassinations, it bombed the Villa Victoria chapel in Jeffrey Ball and Todd Wilson's area, which sustained severe damage to the entrance and exterior facade. Graffiti on the side of the chapel said "Americans go home."

Other chapels were robbed, and another nearby chapel was nearly bombed. This chapel was also vandalized, with graffiti saying "Americans go home." A young man attending a youth activity saw a cardboard box in the chapel and took it home to his family, who lived across the street. When he showed it to his mother the next morning, she discovered a bomb inside the box. The family left their home and called the police, who came to investigate. The police reported that the bomb had a main wire and a backup wire and that, although the first wire was disconnected, the second was still intact. They had no explanation for why the bomb had not gone off. The mother was convinced that it was a miracle.

These incidents were reported to the Mission President, Steven R. Wright, who did not feel inspired to remove missionaries from the area, but counseled them to live close to the spirit and follow that inspiration. Not long after, tragedy occurred.

== Assassinations ==
For several months, members of FAL Zarate Willka had been determining the schedules of the missionaries. Police discovered that one group member, Susana Zapana Hannover, had been a member of the LDS Church and another had been receiving discussions from the zone leader over the area. A rumor later surfaced of a hit list that the group held which named several other missionaries and Americans in the area. On Wednesday, May 24, 1989, after returning at about 9:30 p.m., Jeffrey Ball and Todd Wilson left their apartment. There are two theories explaining why they left. One says that they had simply returned home that evening without having eaten dinner, and decided to go get food. The other idea is that the assassins lured them out by having someone call them saying that the sisters needed a film projector. Such a call seemed plausible since the sisters didn't have a telephone. They were then followed back to their apartment as they returned at about 10:20 p.m.

As they were about to enter their apartment, a yellow compact car (possibly a Volkswagen) drove by, and they were shot with 9 mm machine gun fire.

One of the men was killed instantly as a bullet penetrated his heart. The other received a spray of bullets in his stomach and back. He remained conscious for a few minutes, then died in an ambulance.

Jeffrey Ball and Todd Wilson shared an apartment with two other missionaries, Thayne Carlson and V. Shane Mylroie. Mylroie was the first to find them. They called an ambulance and notified President Wright.

Within half an hour of the slayings, a note from FAL Zarate Willka was received at the newspaper offices of El Matutino Ultima Hora de La Paz. It read:

Yankees and their Bolivian lackeys' violation of our national sovereignty will not remain unpunished. The Yankee invaders who come to massacre our peasant brethren are warned, as are their local slaves. We, the poor, have no other road than to rise up in arms. Our hatred is implacable, and our war is to the death.

== Motivations ==
At first, beyond the note received at newspaper offices, officials knew little about FAL Zarate Willka's philosophy. One United States House Foreign Affairs Committee member theorized that the attack could have come from the political left or right, "the left, because they [the missionaries] represent anti-communist America; the right because they proselytize the Indians, and (those on the right) want them left alone and unchanged. The right includes the big landowners and mine owners." Some guessed that this group might be a branch of the Sendero Luminoso (Shining Path), a prominent Peruvian terrorist group.

At this time, the United States had three main goals in Bolivia, "fostering democracy, supporting economic stabilization and development and reducing production of coca, the plant used to make cocaine," of which the single largest interest was "the impact that production of the coca and cocaine has on the body politic up here. The No. 1 U.S. interest in Bolivia is doing away with that problem." The general climate in Bolivia reflected dissatisfaction with these policies. One former sister missionary reports being accosted by groups of students demanding to know why Bolivia should change its coca culture because the United States had a drug problem. Years later, graffiti asserting that "Coca is not cocaine nor Coca-Cola" could be seen on walls in Bolivia.

It was early theorized by Bolivian and U.S. officials that this group resisted U.S. anti-drug policies, possibly being connected with drug traffickers. However, this drug theory later became seen as only part of a larger problem as officials discovered FAL Zarate Willka's Marxist ideology, which was mixed with the philosophies of an Indian Rights movement known as Katarismo. Such findings were further confirmed as authorities learned that one or more of the rebels had received bomb training in Cuba. "It's pure Cuban terrorism, I don't think there is any question about it," said Ambassador Robert Gelbard. Thus, Bolivian Marxist ideologues and politicians such as FAL Zarate Willka considered United States anti-drug and military aid programs as violating their national sovereignty. In addition to using the United States as a scapegoat for Bolivia's problems, FAL Zarate Willka "sought revenge for their political party's poor showing in Bolivia's recent national election," on May 15, blaming the United States for this as well, claimed Gelbard.

FAL Zarate Willka attacked religious targets, such as the LDS Church, because they viewed the church as an imperialist agent of U.S. interests. While this may seem unreasonable to an organization that constantly affirms its political neutrality and disavows any connection with any government, according to leftist groups, "the connection is so apparent that there is no need to explain or justify it." Latin America does not share the tradition of separation of church and state found in the United States. On the contrary, religion has played a prominent role in politics since the European colonization of the 1500s. Their idea of imperialism is not limited to territorial expansion, but "involves a whole series of political, cultural, and religious means," including the LDS Church. This view of the LDS Church as Yankee is reinforced by a heavy American missionary presence, midwestern worship styles, centralization of the church in the United States, and the church's doctrinal justification of the United States Constitution. This view is further substantiated by the tithes and offerings that go directly to church headquarters in Salt Lake City, Utah, the church's extensive corporate holdings, and the impressive structure and location of its buildings.

It is generally felt that this group targeted American missionaries because they were such an easy mark. Their white shirts, ties, and name tags made them stand out prominently, to say nothing of their generally fair complexion and relative height. Jeffrey Ball and Todd Wilson worked in a particularly poor, rough section of La Paz that was "well known for its brothels and bars, and the fact that most of the people in that part of town wouldn't say anything about what they saw." Indeed, the United States felt it necessary to offer a $500,000 reward for information leading to the capture of the assassins, in an attempt to induce individuals to come forward.

Finally, while some have speculated that Jeffrey Ball and Todd Wilson were not the intended targets, that "the group made a mistake and then decided to run with it" and the assassination was "nothing but a tragic error," the evidence suggested that the missionaries were staked out and might have been lured from their apartment. Furthermore, the group had particularly targeted the LDS Church, and had even bombed a chapel in the area. These facts, combined with the assertion of the U.S. Consul in Bolivia that the terrorists could have assassinated practically any member of the U.S. diplomatic mission had they merely desired an American target, overwhelmingly suggest that Jeffrey Ball and Todd Wilson were specifically marked by the terrorists for assassination.

== Reactions ==
Word spread quickly in the mission. "I speak for the other missionaries when I say I'm scared right now. We're real scared," said Mark Huffaker, a former companion of Ball to Deseret News reporters. "We're all kind of scared right now," echoed Brad Giles, who served with Wilson. "I guess it's fear of the unknown. But everyone still wants to finish their missions."

Similar response was heard in Utah. That night in Wellington, Stake President Roger Branch interviewed Wilson's younger brother, Brad, as he prepared for his mission. A few hours later, he and the bishop went to the Wilson home to notify them of the murders. Brad was asleep on the couch, but awoke when he heard his parents crying. President Branch then witnessed Sister Wilson whom he described as an "angel," consoling her family.

The next day, the First Presidency issued a statement reading in part:

We are grieved to learn of the assassination of two of our missionaries .... We regret that anyone would think that these ..., who have been sent to preach the gospel of peace, would be characterized as enemies of any group. They have died as martyrs in the cause of the Lord.

Community reaction was one of shock. Coalville Utah Stake President Myron Richins said, "This is something we can't explain. It takes something greater and more powerful than us." Jane Caspar, a friend of the Ball family explained the general feeling, "No one can comprehend it; it's just unbelievable. It's something that happens somewhere else to someone else's kids." Another friend, Terry McQueen lamented, "He was there doing what the Lord wanted him to do, so why did this happen?" Later that year, the football team that Jeff Ball had captained dedicated their season to him and went on to win the 1A High School Championship with an 11–1 season. A scholarship fund was also established in his memory.

The bodies of the missionaries arrived in Salt Lake City on Delta Flight 705 on Sunday, May 28. Awaiting the plane's arrival were M. Russell Ballard of the Quorum of the Twelve, Russell C. Taylor of the Second Quorum of the Seventy, and Jeffrey Ball's mother, father, grandfather, brother, and sister, Wendy, who had taken a leave of absence from her mission. The Wilsons chose to attend their Sunday meetings in Wellington, and had asked a family friend, a local mortician, to pick up Todd Wilson's body. Ballard told reporters at the airport, "These missionaries returned to us today in these caskets have fulfilled a noble service ... we pray that hearts will be softened and tragedies like this will never occur again to such wonderful, good men who have devoted their lives to preaching the gospel of peace."

The funerals for both men were held at noon on Tuesday, May 30, in their respective hometowns. Ball's funeral was attended by President Ezra Taft Benson and his counselor Thomas S. Monson, as well as Ballard and Monte J. Brough of the Seventy and over one thousand guests. President Benson's other counselor, Gordon B. Hinckley, presided at Wilson's funeral, which was also attended by L. Tom Perry of the Twelve, Taylor, and seven hundred others. "Missionaries are so dear to the entire church that when one is lost through death the entire church grieves," said President Hinckley. President Monson affirmed, "It is no small thing to have every missionary parent praying for you and knowing that your hearts are filled with sorrow." He continued, "I think your son would say, 'Do not grieve, mother. Do not sorrow, father. I am on the Lord's errand and he may do with me as he sees fit.'" Ballard stated that out of about 447,969 missionaries who had served, only 525 had lost their lives. And of those, Perry declared, only 17 had died as martyrs in this cause. President Hinckley reminded, "He might have given his life in other causes. He could not have given it in a greater cause than this." Wendy Ball and Dan and Diane Wilson, siblings of the Elders, also spoke. Dan read from Wilson's missionary journal, "I know that my call was inspired of God and there is someone in Bolivia that only I can touch." Wendy commented on a humorous missionary incident of her brother's saying, "He always told us to keep a sense of humor." Dan and Diane Wilson together concluded their brother's tribute, reciting what they felt their brother might say, "I have fought a good fight, I have finished the course, I have kept the faith."

Similar feelings were expressed at a memorial service held Sunday May 28 in the Sopocachi Stake Center in La Paz, Bolivia. More than 1,500 people attended this meeting, including 120 missionaries. Church leaders and former companions expressed condolences and renewed their dedication to missionary work. President Wright may have shared a dream he had which Ballard later quoted in General Conference:

I saw these two elders dressed in white, standing at the doors of a beautiful building. They were greeting numerous people, who also were dressed in white as they entered the building. It was obvious from their dress that those who entered were Bolivians. I envisioned the temple that will someday be built in Bolivia. Elders Wilson and Ball were ushering those they had prepared to receive the gospel in the spirit world into the temple to witness the vicarious ordinances being performed in their behalf. This dream has been a great comfort to me and has helped me to understand and accept their deaths.

Following the assassinations, all missionaries were ordered to remain in their rooms for one full week. They were told only to leave when absolutely necessary, and then to wear preparation day clothing instead of regular missionary attire. Members brought in their meals. While they were allowed to attend their meetings on Sunday, including the memorial service, and were reported to be "in good spirits," that week was still difficult. Many worried about their investigators, who would not receive regular contact, and who, if the missionaries were transferred or redeployed, might not be contacted again for "quite some time." Parents of the missionaries were allowed to contact their sons and daughters during this time. Ryan Young remembered "how upset my Dad was when he heard the news on the radio on the way to work." Another mother expressed of her son, "I just don't know how I'm going to live through the next year if he stays there." It was a tense situation. "I don't think anyone felt secure at the time," expressed Young.

When missionaries did begin to leave their apartments, they did so at first without wearing their name tags, though shortly after they resumed doing so. M. Russell Ballard, accompanied by Charles Didier of the Seventy, toured nine missions in early June in Bolivia, Peru and Ecuador. During this visit, they "gave instructions to the missionaries concerning safety precautions they need to observe, including returning to their apartments by 9:30 p.m. and how to travel and conduct themselves in the present climate." The church leaders were accompanied by Richard T. Bretzing, managing director of church security and a retired FBI agent, who gave the missionaries "guidelines for taking precautionary measures," such as to "change [their] routine every day and not do the same things at the same time."

There was a push to pair North American missionaries with Latin missionaries as a precautionary measure.

Despite these precautions, trouble continued to brew. Missionaries were pulled out over the Fourth of July in Huanuni, Oruro, a "hot spot," where in an unreported incident in the mid- 1970s the Elders' home was blown up in their absence, killing the members who were staying there.(88)

Less than a week later, during the evening of Monday, July 10, 1989, the Hamacas Ward chapel in Santa Cruz, Bolivia was bombed. According to Erwin Birnbaumer, Paraíso Stake President, the bomb caused an estimated $16,000 in damage. While he asserted that "a bomb is not going to scare any of us," the First Presidency responded to the general political unrest by reassigning some American missionaries in Bolivia and Peru to other countries and sending others home early. Mission presidents were contacted directly by members of the First Presidency, and informed that "all (American) missionaries with release dates between now [July] and December will be sent home this month and next." While a few Americans remained in the mission, most were sent home or redeployed. Any new American missionaries who arrived were dark-complexioned or Hispanic, "not blondies." These changes reduced the ratio of North American missionaries to their Latin counterparts to about 30/70. Six American sisters were reassigned to the Texas Houston Spanish speaking Mission.

== Government response ==
The impact of the assassinations was not limited to the LDS Church and its members, however. Political, not religious factors motivated the assassinations, and politics soon became involved.

The Governments of Bolivia and the United States both responded with outrage shortly following the attack. Utah's senior senator, Jake Garn (R) expressed, "Such wanton and cowardly acts are among the most disgusting and callous actions of which human beings are capable. They are unforgivable under any circumstances but seem especially so when the victims are young men who have made great personal sacrifices and dedicated themselves to serve their church and fellow man." Orrin Hatch (R–UT) echoed his colleague, calling the killings "a heinous act" of terrorism; "their service was in no way political, and they were innocents in this despicable act."

Helen Lane, Bolivian desk officer for the U.S. State Department, expressed the Bolivians' dismay at the slayings,

The Bolivian government—from the president on down—is shocked by the crime. ... The work of Mormon missionaries is quite well regarded down there. Several newspapers have written editorials condemning the murders. It was a shock because violent crime is not all that common in Bolivia. These were the first assassinations in memory, at least in several years.

Consequently, as is permitted any time an American citizen is killed by terrorists, an FBI probe was sent to Bolivia on May 30 to investigate the slayings. The investigation included five or six members who brought ballistics laboratory equipment, polygraphs, and other equipment. One agent, Michael McPheters, commented on the Bolivians' lack of equipment, "the only big case they'd ever had was when terrorists tried to kill George Shultz. They had one microscope that looked like it came from a high school biology class about twenty years ago. They didn't have cars and they didn't have many guns either." Two of the agents served as liaison between the Embassy and the Minister of the Interior, which heads the Bolivian police. One worked the ballistics equipment, while the other operated the lie detector. McPheters hit the streets with a Bolivian policeman, where they "went through it with a fine-tooth comb and developed witnesses who saw and heard things," in an effort to reconstruct the chronology of the crime. The decision to offer a $500,000 reward was made on June 17 to encourage local residents to come forward with information. While this may have helped, Robert Wharten, press attaché at the U.S. Embassy said that the arrests were "the result of good, solid police work on the part of the Bolivians. The Bolivians should be credited for them."

The initial arrests took place over one week. On Saturday, June 24, after following a "trail of suspects," police arrested Constantino Yujra Loza, a sociology student, and his cousin, who was later released. Yujra declared that the police "approached me and told me 'I have an arrest warrant,' whereupon I resisted and even tried to escape, so they grabbed me and started to hit me brutally until they had me on the ground. They did the same thing to my cousin." Yujra later confessed to having participated in the attack on George Shultz. By Wednesday, June 28, police had also arrested Dr. Gabriel Rojas Bilbao, alleged ideological leader of FAL Zarate Willka, and Tema Salazar Mamani. These arrests led to the naming of brothers Nelson and Félix Encinas Laguna as prime suspects of the bomb on Parliament, and according to Information Minister Hermán Antelo, there were also "indications of their participation in the murders" of Elders Jeffrey Ball and Todd Wilson. Also suspected were two individuals known as "Horacio" and "El Sapo" (the toad), presumably the leaders of the group. Cnl. Antonio Rojas, a Bolivian officer assigned to the case, stated that while they were staking out the home of Susana Zapana (the suspect who had been a member of the LDS Church),

At 11:30 p.m., Susana hadn't arrived to tell us who Horacio was. ... But two young men did arrive and began to knock on the door and nobody opened it .... So one of our men went to speak with them, and immediately they both ran away. We didn't know who they were. ... One of our men ran, 'stop, stop, stop,' and threw them both to the ground. We didn't know who they were, but afterwards they turned out to be Felix and Nelson Encinas.

Despite these arrests, several members of FAL Zarate Willka remained at large, including Johnny Justino Peralta Espinoza, the supposed ringleader of the group, and Susana Zapana Hannover, the former member of the LDS Church, as well as a cousin of the Encinas brothers. The families of these individuals considered them to have disappeared. The trial began soon after Ambassador Gelbard declared to officials of the LDs Church during a Salt Lake City visit that "I have made it crystal clear to the president of Bolivia that this is of the greatest importance to us and we want to bring this to the end of the investigation."

However, the trial progressed very slowly. The first judge assigned to the case, Nestor Loredo, resigned on October 4 as a consequence of anonymous telephoned death threats. The second judge also resigned because he anticipated the trial to be thrown out of court for lack of evidence.(107) By February 8, 1990, the trial seemed to be entering into its final phases, when Judge David Rivas Gradin felt that the key testimonies of two women would enable him to reach a verdict. However, after the resignation of the first two judges, Rivas ordered the five suspects (Yujra, the Encinas brothers, Dr. Rojas, and Simón Tema Mamani) to remain in prison without bail. As a result, the prisoners protested their innocence, and began staging a hunger strike on March 31. Rivas (who was not allowed to rule on the case), along with the prosecuting attorney, José Rivero, sent a plea to the Justice Court of La Paz to appoint a new judge. However, according to a report by the U.S. State Department, "Patterns of Global Terrorism, 1990," a new judge had still not been appointed by the end of 1990. However, a judge was appointed in 1991, and by June the case was predicted to conclude sometime over the next few months.

Finally, on October 9, 1991, the U.S. State Department announced that the defendants had been sentenced to long prison terms. María Sanchez Carlos, head of the department's Bolivia desk wrote Senator Hatch, "There are eight defendants, three of whom are at large, and they got 30 years. The other five, who are currently in jail, got sentences from five to 20 years." The sentences were expected to be appealed to the Bolivia Supreme Court.

Police continued to watch the homes of the remaining members of FAL Zarate Willka. On July 20, 1990, at about 6:45 a.m., a group of agents stopped a student, Juan Domingo Peralta, brother of Johnny Peralta, who was going to take a test at the Universidad Mayor de San Andrés. When Juan attempted to hide, the agents shot him. According to witnesses, after the act, a commander of the group realized, "it's not him, we were wrong." After abandoning the body, Juan's mother and sister took him to the Hospital Juan XXIII accompanied by one of the vigilant police officers, where he was refused medical attention, as police had ordered personnel to "not assist the terrorist." While Juan's sister tried to get the order reversed, his mother watched her son die.

As a result of this tragedy and a subsequent sickness, where he allegedly "thought he was dying," Johnny Peralta returned to his mother's home, where police promptly arrested him. Peralta later stated:

I think that my brother's death was a kind of message to me, a message that was expressed in the most crude, the most violent, the most bloody manner possible. I took that message from the embassy as a type of blackmail, pressure, and action with respect to my person. For me, the death of my brother meant that I had to give myself up at some point, I was a fugitive for three years.

Johnny Peralta claimed, "I am politically responsible for the actions of Zarate Willka, beginning with the attack against the companies of multimillionaire Mario Mercado to the last attack" including the attack on former Secretary George Shultz, the attempted assassination of Ambassador Robert Gelbard, the bombing of the Bolivian Parliament building, and the murders of Jeffrey Brent Ball and Todd Ray Wilson. This action resulted in the suspension of the trial for the other five defendants. At the time, Judge German Urquiza had been scheduled to decide whether the defendants had been accessories to the shooting. Don LeFevre, spokesman for the LDS Church, commended "the Bolivian authorities for their persistence in the pursuit of justice."

== Further developments ==
Terrorist acts against the LDS Church in South America did not end with the deaths of Wilson and Ball. On August 22, 1990, at about 1:30 p.m., in Huancayo, Peru, members of the Tupac Amaru Revolutionary Movement (MRTA) ambushed Manuel Antonio Hidalgo of Arequipa, Peru and his companion Cristian Andreani Ugarte of Trujillo, Peru, serving in the Peru Lima East Mission. The missionaries were apparently on their way to a lunch appointment. Both Elders were beaten, one was stabbed in the throat, and they were both shot once in the head. Their bodies were found with a sign saying, "This is how imperialists' supporters die." The First Presidency released a statement in which they expressed shock and sadness and "pray[ed] for an end to the hatred and misunderstanding which led to this tragedy."

Following on the heels of this tragedy, Oscar Zapata of Piura, Peru, who had been serving in the Peru Lima East Mission for just two weeks, was shot on March 6, 1991, after getting off a bus in the remote town of Tarma, Peru. No one saw where the shot came from that killed him.

As a result of these shootings, North American missionaries were further reduced in Bolivia and Peru. According to Thomas Vea, who served in the Cochabamba Bolivia Mission from March 1990 to March 1992, "90% of the missionaries were Bolivians" at this time, as no new American missionaries were called at this time and those few already in Bolivia completed their missions. By 1993, all North American missionaries had been removed from these missions. Once the missionaries' safety in these areas was determined, North American missionaries began to return around September 1994. In the Bolivia Cochabamba mission, forty-eight American elders and two sisters arrived in the first year (September 1994 – September 1995). Once these missionaries' safety had been reasonably ascertained, fourteen American sisters and three Elders arrived between October 1995 and March 1996. Only five more American elders had arrived by September 1996, when regular groups of Elders and Sisters began arriving. Because sisters are called for periods of eighteen months and elders for periods of twenty-four months, all but a handful of the initial American missionaries who had arrived in the first two years since the mission was reopened to Americans had returned home by July 1997. During this time, Latin missionaries were called to the Bolivia Cochabamba mission at about twice the rate of North American missionaries. Other missions in Bolivia and Peru saw similar patterns as the missions were reintegrated with American and Latin missionaries.

== See also ==
- List of assassinations
- List of (non-state) terrorist incidents
