= Avianca Flight 203 =

1989 airliner bombing in Colombia

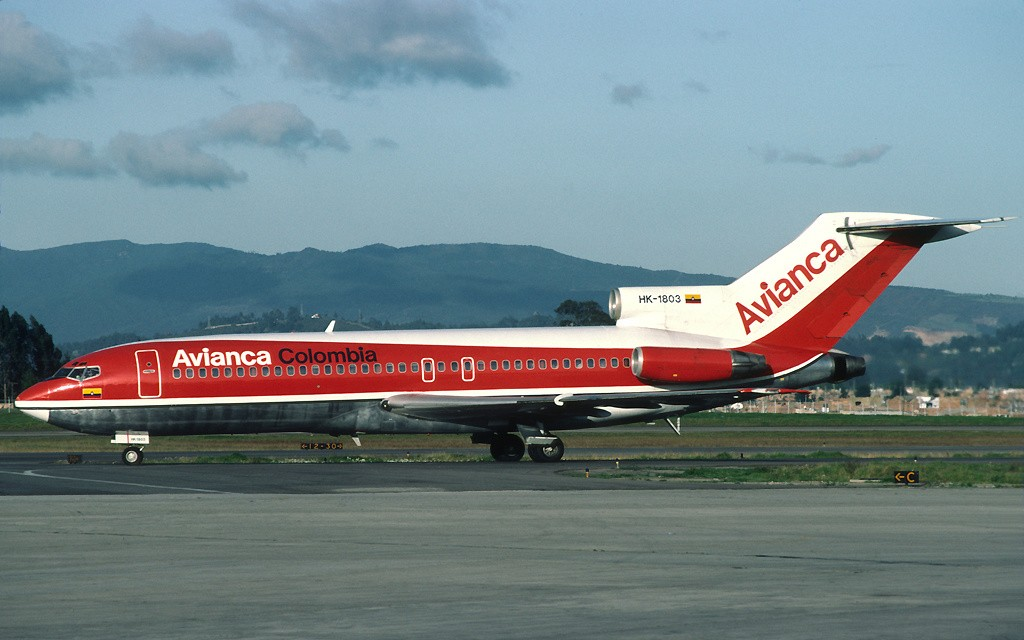
- HK-1803, the aircraft involved in the bombing, pictured in 1982

Bombing
- Date: November 27, 1989
- Summary: In-flight breakup due to terrorist bombing
- Site: Cerro Canoas, Soacha, Colombia; 4°33′30″N 74°15′45″W
- Total fatalities: 110

Aircraft
- Aircraft type: Boeing 727-21
- Operator: Avianca
- IATA flight No.: AV203
- ICAO flight No.: AVA203
- Call sign: AVIANCA 203
- Registration: HK-1803
- Flight origin: El Dorado Int'l Airport
- Destination: Alfonso Bonilla Aragón Int'l Airport
- Occupants: 107
- Passengers: 101
- Crew: 6
- Fatalities: 107
- Survivors: 0

Ground casualties
- Ground fatalities: 3

Avianca Flight 203 was a Colombian domestic passenger flight from El Dorado International Airport in Bogotá to Alfonso Bonilla Aragón International Airport in Cali, Colombia of a Boeing 727. It was destroyed by a bomb over the municipality of Soacha on November 27, 1989. All 107 people on board as well as three people on the ground were killed. The bombing had been ordered by Medellín's drug cartel.

== Aircraft and crew ==
The aircraft was a Boeing 727-21 with registration number HK-1803, serial number 19035, and line number 272. The aircraft was built in 1966, and had its maiden flight on May 19 of the same year. The aircraft was delivered to Pan Am on May 28, and was registered as N326PA. Avianca acquired the aircraft in November 1975, when it was re-registered as HK-1803.

The captain was José Ignacio Ossa Aristizábal (40), the first officer was Fernando Pizarro Esguerra (22), and the flight engineer was Luis Jairo Castiblanco Vargas (34). There were three flight attendants on board.

== Flight ==
Flight 203 took off as scheduled at 07:13. Five minutes into the flight, at a speed of 794 kilometres per hour (429 knots) and an altitude of 13,000 feet (4,000 metres), an explosive charge detonated, causing fuel vapors in the empty central fuel tank to ignite. Eyewitnesses on the ground reported seeing fire erupt out of the right side of the aircraft's fuselage. A second blast ripped the airliner apart; the nose section separated from the tail section, which went down in flames. The wreckage was scattered in a five-kilometre (three-mile) radius around the town of Soacha. All 107 people on board were killed, as well as three people on the ground who were hit by falling debris.

== Aftermath ==
An investigation determined that plastic explosives were used to destroy the plane. Drug king Pablo Escobar, of the Medellín drug cartel, planned the bombing in the lead-up to the 1990 elections, hoping the bomb plot would kill presidential candidate César Gaviria. One account states that two unidentified men dressed in suits who worked for Escobar carried the bomb on board. The men sat in seats 18A and 18K, located above the main fuel tank. At the last moment, one of the men left the aircraft, while his partner stayed on board and was killed in the bombing. A young Colombian man named Alberto Prieto was duped into staying on the flight and activating the bomb once the aircraft had become airborne, thus unknowingly killing himself; he had been told the device was just a recorder he had to turn on to record the conversation of a nearby couple of passengers; because of this, the man had been nicknamed "El Suizo", or "The Swiss", in reference to his role as a "suicide" bomber. Gaviria was not on the aircraft, despite Escobar's expectations, and went on to be elected president. Two Americans were among the dead, prompting the Bush administration to begin Intelligence Support Activity operations to find Escobar.

Nine days after the bombing of the plane, the DAS Building bombing, presumably also ordered by the Medellín Cartel, killed 63 people in Bogotá.

Dandeny Muñoz Mosquera (alias "La Quica"), the chief assassin for the Medellín Cartel, was convicted in 1994 in United States District Court of having been involved in the bombing and various other crimes, and was sentenced to 10 consecutive life sentences.

== Later events ==
On November 28, 2016, the Colombian newspaper El Espectador started publishing an investigative report, consisting of 8 chapters, on Flight 203. It argues that the explosion was caused by a malfunctioning fuel pump inside a tank which had been reported several times before. The report was heavily criticized by Avianca and family members of the victims.

== In popular culture ==
This event is dramatized in Season 1, Episode 6 of Narcos (2015).

== Similar incidents ==
- Metrojet Flight 9268, terrorist bombing perpetrated by the Islamic State's Sinai Branch.
- Iraqi Airways Flight 163, hijacking and bombing perpetrated by the Islamic Jihad Organization.
- Pan Am Flight 103, in-flight bombing as part of a terrorist attack by Libyan agents.
- Air India Flight 182, terrorist bombing perpetrated by Babbar Khalsa.

== See also ==
- Medellín Cartel
- Colombian conflict
