= List of statutory rules of Northern Ireland, 2007 =

This is an incomplete list of statutory rules of Northern Ireland in 2007.

== 1-100 ==
- Rates (Industrial Hereditaments) (Amendment) Order (Northern Ireland) 2007 (S.R. 2007 No. 1)
- Rates (Payment by Owners by Agreement) (Amendment) Order (Northern Ireland) 2007 (S.R. 2007 No. 2)
- Registration of Deeds (Fees) Order (Northern Ireland) 2007 (S.R. 2007 No. 3)
- Registration (Amendment) Rules (Northern Ireland) 2007 (S.R. 2007 No. 4)
- Registration of Deeds (Amendment) Regulations (Northern Ireland) 2007 (S.R. 2007 No. 5)
- Land Registry (Fees) Order (Northern Ireland) 2007 (S.R. 2007 No. 6)
- Motor Vehicles (Wearing of Seat Belts) (Amendment) Regulations (Northern Ireland) 2007 (S.R. 2007 No. 7)
- Motor Vehicles (Wearing of Seat Belts) (Amendment No. 2) Regulations (Northern Ireland) 2007 (S.R. 2007 No. 8)
- Motor Vehicles (Wearing of Seat Belts by Children in Front Seats) (Amendment) Regulations (Northern Ireland) 2007 (S.R. 2007 No. 9)
- Planning (Trees) (Amendment) Regulations (Northern Ireland) 2007 (S.R. 2007 No. 10)
- Health and Personal Social Services (Joint Committee for Commissioning) Order (Northern Ireland) 2007 (S.R. 2007 No. 14)
- Motor Vehicles (Construction and Use) (Amendment) Regulations (Northern Ireland) 2007 (S.R. 2007 No. 15)
- Food Hygiene (Amendment) Regulations (Northern Ireland) 2007 (S.R. 2007 No. 16)
- Smoke Control Areas (Authorised Fuels) (Amendment) Regulations (Northern Ireland) 2007 (S.R. 2007 No. 17)
- Meat (Official Controls Charges) (Amendment) Regulations (Northern Ireland) 2007 (S.R. 2007 No. 18)
- Foyle Area and Carlingford Area (Licensing of Fishing Engines) (Amendment) Regulations 2007 (S.R. 2007 No. 19)
- Non-Domestic Rating (Hardship Relief) Regulations (Northern Ireland) 2007 (S.R. 2007 No. 20)
- Plant Health (Import Inspection Fees) (Amendment) Regulations (Northern Ireland) 2007 (S.R. 2007 No. 21)
- Employment Rights (Increase of Limits) Order (Northern Ireland) 2007 (S.R. 2007 No. 22)
- Environmental Impact Assessment (Fish Farming in Marine Waters) Regulations (Northern Ireland) 2007 (S.R. 2007 No. 23)
- Recovery of Health Services Charges (Reviews and Appeals) Regulations (Northern Ireland) 2007 (S.R. 2007 No. 24)
- Special Educational Needs and Disability (2005 Order) (Commencement No. 1) (Amendment) Order (Northern Ireland) 2007 (S.R. 2007 No. 25)
- Pensions (2005 Order) (Code of Practice) (Modification of Subsisting Rights) (Appointed Day) Order (Northern Ireland) 2007 (S.R. 2007 No. 26)
- Less Favoured Area Compensatory Allowances Regulations (Northern Ireland) 2007 (S.R. 2007 No. 27)
- Street Works (Inspection Fees) (Amendment) Regulations (Northern Ireland) 2007 (S.R. 2007 No. 29)
- Rates (Unoccupied Hereditaments) Regulations (Northern Ireland) 2007 (S.R. 2007 No. 30)
- Control of Asbestos Regulations (Northern Ireland) 2007 (S.R. 2007 No. 31)
- Welfare of Animals (Transport) (Amendment) Regulations (Northern Ireland) 2007 (S.R. 2007 No. 32)
- Dairy Produce Quotas (Amendment) Regulations (Northern Ireland) 2007 (S.R. 2007 No. 33)
- Allocation of Housing and Homelessness (Eligibility) (Amendment) Regulations (Northern Ireland) 2007 (S.R. 2007 No. 34)
- Passenger and Goods Vehicles (Recording Equipment) (Tachograph Card) Regulations (Northern Ireland) 2007 (S.R. 2007 No. 36)
- Housing (Amendment) (2006 Order) (Commencement) Order (Northern Ireland) 2007 (S.R. 2007 No. 37)
- Prescribed Dwelling-house Regulations (Northern Ireland) 2007 (S.R. 2007 No. 38)
- Prescribed Fees and Charges Regulations (Northern Ireland) 2007 (S.R. 2007 No. 39)
- Rent Book (Savings) Order (Northern Ireland) 2007 (S.R. 2007 No. 40)
- Private Crossings (Signs and Barriers) Regulations (Northern Ireland) 2007 (S.R. 2007 No. 41)
- Education (2006 Order) (Commencement No. 1) Order (Northern Ireland) 2007 (S.R. 2007 No. 42)
- Education (Pupil Records and Reporting) (Transitional) Regulations (Northern Ireland) 2007 (S.R. 2007 No. 43)
- Education (Other Skills) Order (Northern Ireland) 2007 (S.R. 2007 No. 44)
- Education (Assessment Arrangements) (Foundation to Key Stage 3) Order (Northern Ireland) 2007 (S.R. 2007 No. 45)
- Education (Curriculum Minimum Content) Order (Northern Ireland) 2007 (S.R. 2007 No. 46)
- Railway Safety Regulations (Northern Ireland) 2007 (S.R. 2007 No. 47)
- Railway Safety (Miscellaneous Provisions) Regulations (Northern Ireland) 2007 (S.R. 2007 No. 48)
- Deposits in the Sea (Amendment) Regulations (Northern Ireland) 2007 (S.R. 2007 No. 51)
- Rates (Regional Rates) Order (Northern Ireland) 2007 (S.R. 2007 No. 52)
- Flexible Working (Eligibility, Complaints and Remedies) (Amendment) Regulations (Northern Ireland) 2007 (S.R. 2007 No. 53)
- Agriculture (Student fees) Regulations (Northern Ireland) 2007 (S.R. 2007 No. 54)
- Criminal Justice (2005 Order) (Commencement No. 3) Order (Northern Ireland) 2007 (S.R. 2007 No. 55)
- Criminal Justice (2003 Order) (Commencement No. 4) Order (Northern Ireland) 2007 (S.R. 2007 No. 56)
- Enterprise Ulster (Dissolution) Order (Northern Ireland) 2007 (S.R. 2007 No. 57)
- Police and Criminal Evidence (Northern Ireland) Order 1989 (Codes of Practice) (No. 3) Order 2007 (S.R. 2007 No. 58)
- Animals and Animal Products (Import and Export) (Amendment) Regulations (Northern Ireland) 2007 (S.R. 2007 No. 59)
- Notification of Marketing of Food for Particular Nutritional Uses Regulations (Northern Ireland) 2007 (S.R. 2007 No. 60)
- Rates Regulations (Northern Ireland) 2007 (S.R. 2007 No. 61)
- Health and Safety (Fees) Regulations (Northern Ireland) 2007 (S.R. 2007 No. 62)
- Occupational and Personal Pension Schemes (Prescribed Bodies) Regulations (Northern Ireland) 2007 (S.R. 2007 No. 64)
- Quick-Frozen Foodstuffs Regulations (Northern Ireland) 2007 (S.R. 2007 No. 65)
- Contaminants in Food Regulations (Northern Ireland) 2007 (S.R. 2007 No. 66)
- Social Security Investigation Powers (Arrangements with Great Britain) Regulations (Northern Ireland) 2007 (S.R. 2007 No. 67)
- Avian Influenza and Influenza of Avian Origin in Mammals Regulations (Northern Ireland) 2007 68)
- Avian Influenza (Vaccination) Regulations (Northern Ireland) 2007 (S.R. 2007 No. 69)
- Avian Influenza (Preventive Measures) Regulations (Northern Ireland) 2007 (S.R. 2007 No. 70)
- Rates (Recreational Hereditaments) Order (Northern Ireland) 2007 (S.R. 2007 No. 72)
- Social Security (Recovery of Benefits) (Amendment) Regulations (Northern Ireland) 2007 (S.R. 2007 No. 73)
- Health and Social Services Trusts (Membership and Procedure) (Amendment) Regulations (Northern Ireland) 2007 (S.R. 2007 No. 82)
- Horse Racing (Charges on Bookmakers) Order (Northern Ireland) 2007 (S.R. 2007 No. 83)
- Metering (Prescribed Consumer) Regulations (Northern Ireland) 2007 (S.R. 2007 No. 84)
- General Grant (Specified Bodies) Regulations (Northern Ireland) 2007 (S.R. 2007 No. 85)
- Rates (Social Sector Value) Regulations (Northern Ireland) 2007 (S.R. 2007 No. 86)
- Tenancy Terms Regulations (Northern Ireland) 2007 (S.R. 2007 No. 87)
- Rent Assessment Committees Regulations (Northern Ireland) 2007 (S.R. 2007 No. 88)
- Rent Book Regulations (Northern Ireland) 2007 (S.R. 2007 No. 89)
- Rates (Transitional Relief) Order (Northern Ireland) 2007 (S.R. 2007 No. 90)
- Employment (Northern Ireland) Order 2003 (Amendment of Schedules 2, 3 and 4) Order (Northern Ireland) 2007 (S.R. 2007 No. 91)
- Local Government (Early Termination of Employment) (Discretionary Compensation) Regulations (Northern Ireland) 2007 (S.R. 2007 No. 93)
- Smoke-free (Premises, Vehicle Operators and Penalty Notices) Regulations (Northern Ireland) 2007 (S.R. 2007 No. 94)
- Companies (Audit, Investigations and Community Enterprise) (2005 Order) (Commencement No. 2) Order (Northern Ireland) 2007 (S.R. 2007 No. 95)
- Public Service Vehicles (Licence Fees) (Amendment) Regulations (Northern Ireland) 2007 (S.R. 2007 No. 97)
- Motor Vehicle Testing (Amendment) Regulations (Northern Ireland) 2007 (S.R. 2007 No. 98)
- Blood Tests (Evidence of Paternity) (Amendment) Regulations (Northern Ireland) 2007 (S.R. 2007 No. 99)
- Fair Employment Tribunal (Remedies) (Amendment) Order (Northern Ireland) 2007 (S.R. 2007 No. 100)

== 101-200 ==
- Industrial Tribunals (Interest on Awards in Sexual Orientation Discrimination Cases) (Amendment) Regulations (Northern Ireland) 2007 (S.R. 2007 No. 101)
- Industrial Tribunals (Interest on Awards in Sex and Disability Discrimination Cases) (Amendment) Regulations (Northern Ireland) 2007 (S.R. 2007 No. 102)
- Race Relations (Interest on Awards) (Amendment) Order (Northern Ireland) 2007 (S.R. 2007 No. 103)
- Renewables Obligation Order (Northern Ireland) 2007 (S.R. 2007 No. 104)
- Planning (General Development) (Amendment) Order (Northern Ireland) 2007 (S.R. 2007 No. 106)
- Milk (Cessation of Production) (Revocation) Scheme (Northern Ireland) 2007 (S.R. 2007 No. 107)
- Meat (Official Controls Charges) Regulations (Northern Ireland) 2007 (S.R. 2007 No. 108)
- Pneumoconiosis, etc., (Workers' Compensation) (Payment of Claims) (Amendment) Regulations (Northern Ireland) 2007 109)
- Quick-Frozen Foodstuffs (No.2) Regulations (Northern Ireland) 2007 (S.R. 2007 No. 110)
- Motor Vehicles (Driving Licences) (Amendment) Regulations (Northern Ireland) 2007 (S.R. 2007 No. 111)
- Social Security (Preparation for Employment Programme 50 to 59 Pilot) Regulations (Northern Ireland) 2007 (S.R. 2007 No. 113)
- Cross-Border Insolvency Regulations (Northern Ireland) 2007 (S.R. 2007 No. 115)
- Food Supplements (Amendment) Regulations (Northern Ireland) 2007 (S.R. 2007 No. 116)
- Smoking (2006 Order) (Commencement) Order (Northern Ireland) 2007 (S.R. 2007 No. 118)
- Non-Domestic Rating (Unoccupied Hereditaments) Regulations (Northern Ireland) 2007 (S.R. 2007 No. 119)
- Rates (Exclusion from Service of Completion Notices) Regulations (Northern Ireland) 2007 (S.R. 2007 No. 120)
- Housing Benefit (Daily Liability Entitlement) (Amendment) Regulations (Northern Ireland) 2007 (S.R. 2007 No. 121)
- Water Abstraction and Impoundment (Licensing) (Amendment) Regulations (Northern Ireland) 2007 (S.R. 2007 No. 122)
- Colours in Food (Amendment) Regulations (Northern Ireland) 2007 (S.R. 2007 No. 123)
- Measuring Instruments (EEC Requirements) (Verification Fees) Regulations (Northern Ireland) 2007 (S.R. 2007 No. 124)
- Weights and Measures (Passing as Fit for Use for Trade and Adjustment Fees) Regulations (Northern Ireland) 2007 (S.R. 2007 No. 125)
- Local Government (General ) (Amendment) Regulations (Northern Ireland) 2007 (S.R. 2007 No. 126)
- Further Education Teachers' (Eligibility) Regulations (Northern Ireland) 2007 (S.R. 2007 No. 127)
- Social Security (Claims and Payments) (Amendment) Regulations (Northern Ireland) 2007 (S.R. 2007 No. 128)
- Social Security (Incapacity Benefit Work-focused Interviews) (Amendment) Regulations (Northern Ireland) 2007 (S.R. 2007 No. 129)
- Police Service of Northern Ireland (Unsatisfactory Performance and Attendance) Regulations 2007 (S.R. 2007 No. 130)
- Private Tenancies (Forms etc.) Regulations (Northern Ireland) 2007 (S.R. 2007 No. 131)
- Health and Social Services Trusts (Dissolution) Order (Northern Ireland) 2007 (S.R. 2007 No. 132)
- Official Controls (Animals, Feed and Food) Regulations (Northern Ireland) 2007 (S.R. 2007 No. 133)
- Smoke-Free (Signs) Regulations (Northern Ireland) 2007 (S.R. 2007 No. 134)
- Work at Height (Amendment) Regulations (Northern Ireland) 2007 (S.R. 2007 No. 135)
- Curd Cheese (Restriction on Placing on the Market) (Revocation) Regulations (Northern Ireland) 2007 (S.R. 2007 No. 136)
- Teachers' Pensions etc. (Reform Amendments) Regulations (Northern Ireland) 2007 (S.R. 2007 No. 137)
- Smoke-free (Exemptions, Vehicles, Penalties and Discounted Amounts) Regulations (Northern Ireland) 2007 (S.R. 2007 No. 138)
- Guaranteed Minimum Pensions Increase Order (Northern Ireland) 2007 (S.R. 2007 No. 139)
- Charges for Drugs and Appliances (Amendment) Regulations (Northern Ireland) 2007 (S.R. 2007 No. 140)
- Optical Charges and Payments (Amendment) Regulations (Northern Ireland) 2007 (S.R. 2007 No. 141)
- Recovery of Health Services Charges (Consequential Provisions) Order (Northern Ireland) 2007 (S.R. 2007 No. 142)
- Firefighters' Compensation Scheme Order (Northern Ireland) 2007 (S.R. 2007 No. 143)
- Firefighters' Pension Scheme Order (Northern Ireland) 2007 (S.R. 2007 No. 144)
- Water and Sewerage Services (Transfer Date) Order (Northern Ireland) 2007 (S.R. 2007 No. 145)
- Social Security and Child Support Commissioners (Procedure) (Amendment) Regulations (Northern Ireland) 2007 (S.R. 2007 No. 146)
- Water Supply (Water Quality) Regulations (Northern Ireland) 2007 (S.R. 2007 No. 147)
- Rate Relief (Education, Training and Leaving Care) Regulations (Northern Ireland) 2007 (S.R. 2007 No. 148)
- Rates (Payment of Interest) Regulations (Northern Ireland) 2007 (S.R. 2007 No. 149)
- Rates (Appeals) Regulations (Northern Ireland) 2007 (S.R. 2007 No. 150)
- Water and Sewerage Charges Scheme Regulations (Northern Ireland) 2007 (S.R. 2007 No. 151)
- Local Government Pension Scheme (Amendment) Regulations (Northern Ireland) 2007 (S.R. 2007 No. 152)
- Social Security Benefits Up-rating Order (Northern Ireland) 2007 (S.R. 2007 No. 153)
- Social Security (Miscellaneous Amendments) Regulations (Northern Ireland) 2007 (S.R. 2007 No. 154)
- Social Security Benefits Up-rating Regulations (Northern Ireland) 2007 (S.R. 2007 No. 155)
- Social Security (Industrial Injuries) (Dependency) (Permitted Earnings Limits) Order (Northern Ireland) 2007 (S.R. 2007 No. 156)
- Pension Protection Fund (Waiver of Pension Protection Levy and Consequential Amendments) Regulations (Northern Ireland) 2007 (S.R. 2007 No. 157)
- Road Humps (Amendment) Regulations (Northern Ireland) 2007 158)
- Local Government (Boundaries 2006) (Commencement No. 1) Order (Northern Ireland) 2007 (S.R. 2007 No. 159)
- Water and Sewerage Services (Successor Company) Order (Northern Ireland) 2007 (S.R. 2007 No. 160)
- Health and Personal Social Services (Assessment of Resources) (Amendment) Regulations (Northern Ireland) 2007 (S.R. 2007 No. 161)
- Health and Personal Social Services (Quality, Improvement and Regulation) (2003 Order) (Specified Agency) Order (Northern Ireland) 2007 (S.R. 2007 No. 162)
- Social Security Revaluation of Earnings Factors Order (Northern Ireland) 2007 (S.R. 2007 No. 163)
- Social Security Pensions (Low Earnings Threshold) Order (Northern Ireland) 2007 (S.R. 2007 No. 164)
- Offshore Safety (Miscellaneous Amendments) Regulations (Northern Ireland) 2007 (S.R. 2007 No. 165)
- Legal Aid (Scope) Regulations (Northern Ireland) 2007 (S.R. 2007 No. 166)
- Social Security (Industrial Injuries) (Prescribed Diseases) (Amendment) Regulations (Northern Ireland) 2007 (S.R. 2007 No. 167)
- Local Government (Payments to Councillors) (Amendment) Regulations (Northern Ireland) 2007 (S.R. 2007 No. 168)
- Pensions Increase (Review) Order (Northern Ireland) 2007 (S.R. 2007 No. 170)
- Workmen's Compensation (Supplementation) (Amendment) Regulations (Northern Ireland) 2007 (S.R. 2007 No. 172)
- Legal Advice and Assistance (Amendment) Regulations (Northern Ireland) 2007 (S.R. 2007 No. 173)
- Legal Advice and Assistance (Financial Conditions) Regulations (Northern Ireland) 2007 (S.R. 2007 No. 174)
- Legal Aid (Financial Conditions) Regulations (Northern Ireland) 2007 (S.R. 2007 No. 175)
- Criminal Evidence (1999 Order) (Commencement No. 5) Order (Northern Ireland) 2007 (S.R. 2007 No. 176)
- Police (Northern Ireland) Act 2003 (Commencement No. 2) Order 2007 (S.R. 2007 No. 177)
- Landfill (Amendment) Regulations (Northern Ireland) 2007 (S.R. 2007 No. 179)
- Rating of Quarries (Plant and Machinery) Order (Northern Ireland) 2007 (S.R. 2007 No. 180)
- Pension Protection Fund (Liability to pay a Contributions Equivalent Premium) Regulations (Northern Ireland) 2007 (S.R. 2007 No. 181)
- Valuation Tribunal Rules (Northern Ireland) 2007 (S.R. 2007 No. 182)
- Rates (Maximum Capital Value) Regulations (Northern Ireland) 2007 (S.R. 2007 No. 184)
- Occupational and Personal Pension Schemes (Miscellaneous Amendments) Regulations (Northern Ireland) 2007 (S.R. 2007 No. 185)
- Pension Protection Fund (Closed Schemes) Regulations (Northern Ireland) 2007 (S.R. 2007 No. 186)
- Urban Waste Water Treatment Regulations (Northern Ireland) 2007 (S.R. 2007 No. 187)
- Healthy Start Scheme and Day Care Food Scheme (Amendment) Regulations (Northern Ireland) 2007 (S.R. 2007 No. 188)
- Rules of the Supreme Court (Northern Ireland) (Amendment) 2007 (S.R. 2007 No. 189)
- Biocidal Products (Amendment) Regulations (Northern Ireland) 2007 (S.R. 2007 No. 190)
- Rates (Transitional Provisions) Order (Northern Ireland) 2007 (S.R. 2007 No. 191)
- Rates (Consequential Provisions) Order (Northern Ireland) 2007 (S.R. 2007 No. 192)
- Pension Protection Fund (Miscellaneous Amendments) Regulations (Northern Ireland) 2007 (S.R. 2007 No. 193)
- Water and Sewerage Services (2006 Order) (Commencement No. 1 and Transitional Provisions) Order (Northern Ireland) 2007 (S.R. 2007 No. 194)
- Education (Student Support) Regulations (Northern Ireland) 2007 (S.R. 2007 No. 195)
- Social Security and Child Support (Miscellaneous Amendments) Regulations (Northern Ireland) 2007 (S.R. 2007 No. 196)
- Education (2006 Order) (Commencement No. 2) Order (Northern Ireland) 2007 (S.R. 2007 No. 197)
- Producer Responsibility Obligations (Packaging Waste) Regulations (Northern Ireland) 2007 (S.R. 2007 No. 198)
- Products of Animal Origin (Third Country Imports) Regulations (Northern Ireland) 2007 (S.R. 2007 No. 199)

== 201-300 ==
- Rate Relief (Qualifying Age) Regulations (Northern Ireland) 2007 (S.R. 2007 No. 203)
- Rate Relief (General) Regulations (Northern Ireland) 2007 (S.R. 2007 No. 204)
- Water Industry (Determination of Turnover for Penalties) Order (Northern Ireland) 2007 (S.R. 2007 No. 205)
- Social Security (Claims and Payments) (Amendment No. 2) Regulations (Northern Ireland) 2007 (S.R. 2007 No. 206)
- Avian Influenza (H5N1 in Poultry) Regulations (Northern Ireland) 2007 (S.R. 2007 No. 207)
- Avian Influenza (H5N1 in Wild Birds) Regulations (Northern Ireland) 2007 (S.R. 2007 No. 208)
- Poultry Breeding Flocks and Hatcheries Scheme Order (Northern Ireland) 2007 (S.R. 2007 No. 209)
- Occupational Pension Schemes (Levies) (Amendment) Regulations (Northern Ireland) 2007 (S.R. 2007 No. 210)
- Pension Protection Fund (Pension Compensation Cap) Order (Northern Ireland) 2007 (S.R. 2007 No. 211)
- Occupational Pension Schemes (Levy Ceiling) Order (Northern Ireland) 2007 (S.R. 2007 No. 212)
- Police (Northern Ireland) Act 2000 (Renewal of Temporary Provisions) Order 2007 214)
- New Firefighters' Pension Scheme Order (Northern Ireland) 2007 (S.R. 2007 No. 215)
- Social Security (Work-focused Interviews for Lone Parents) (Amendment) Regulations (Northern Ireland) 2007 (S.R. 2007 No. 219)
- Health and Personal Social Services (Quality, Improvement and Regulation) (2003 Order) (Commencement No. 4 and Transitional Provisions) Order (Northern Ireland) 2007 (S.R. 2007 No. 220)
- Adult Placement Agencies Regulations (Northern Ireland) 2007 (S.R. 2007 No. 221)
- Regulation and Improvement Authority (Registration) (Amendment) Regulations (Northern Ireland) 2007 (S.R. 2007 No. 222)
- Regulation and Improvement Authority (Fees and Frequency of Inspections) (Amendment) Regulations (Northern Ireland) 2007 (S.R. 2007 No. 223)
- Animals and Animal Products (Import and Export) (Amendment No.2) Regulations (Northern Ireland) 2007 (S.R. 2007 No. 224)
- Employment Equality (Age) (Consequential Amendments) Regulations (Northern Ireland) 2007 (S.R. 2007 No. 225)
- Community Benefit Societies (Restriction on Use of Assets) (Amendment) Regulations (Northern Ireland) 2007 (S.R. 2007 No. 226)
- Day Care Setting Regulations (Northern Ireland) 2007 (S.R. 2007 No. 234)
- Domiciliary Care Agencies Regulations (Northern Ireland) 2007 (S.R. 2007 No. 235)
- Residential Family Centres Regulations (Northern Ireland) 2007 (S.R. 2007 No. 236)
- Justice (Northern Ireland) Act 2002 (Commencement No. 12) Order 2007 (S.R. 2007 No. 237)
- Motor Vehicles (Construction and Use) (Amendment No. 2) Regulations (Northern Ireland) 2007 (S.R. 2007 No. 238)
- Road Vehicles Lighting (Amendment) Regulations (Northern Ireland) 2007 (S.R. 2007 No. 239)
- Motor Vehicles (Type Approval) Regulations (Northern Ireland) 2007 (S.R. 2007 No. 240)
- Motorways Traffic (Amendment) Regulations (Northern Ireland) 2007 (S.R. 2007 No. 242)
- River Lagan Tidal Navigation and General Bye-laws (Northern Ireland) 2007 (S.R. 2007 No. 243)
- Rate Relief (Qualifying Age) (Amendment) Regulations (Northern Ireland) 2007 (S.R. 2007 No. 244)
- Pollution Prevention and Control (Amendment) Regulations (Northern Ireland) 2007 (S.R. 2007 No. 245)
- Bee Diseases and Pests Control Order (Northern Ireland) 2007 (S.R. 2007 No. 246)
- Offshore Installations (Safety Case) Regulations (Northern Ireland) 2007 (S.R. 2007 No. 247)
- Disability Discrimination (Taxis) (Carrying of Guide Dogs etc.) (Amendment) Regulations (Northern Ireland) 2007 (S.R. 2007 No. 248)
- Plant Protection Products (Amendment) Regulations (Northern Ireland) 2007 (S.R. 2007 No. 251)
- Plant Health (Import Inspection Fees) (Amendment No. 2) Regulations (Northern Ireland) 2007 (S.R. 2007 No. 252)
- Lands Tribunal (Salaries) Order (Northern Ireland) 2007 (S.R. 2007 No. 255)
- Landfill (Amendment No. 2) Regulations (Northern Ireland) 2007 (S.R. 2007 No. 258)
- Salaries (Comptroller and Auditor General) Order (Northern Ireland) 2007 (S.R. 2007 No. 259)
- Whole of Government Accounts (Designation of Bodies) Order (Northern Ireland) 2007 (S.R. 2007 No. 260)
- Equality Act (Sexual Orientation) (Amendment No. 2) Regulations (Northern Ireland) 2007 (S.R. 2007 No. 261)
- Jobseeker's Allowance (Extension of the Preparation for Employment Programme) (Amendment) Regulations (Northern Ireland) 2007 (S.R. 2007 No. 262)
- Social Security and Housing Benefit (Amendment) Regulations (Northern Ireland) 2007 (S.R. 2007 No. 263)
- Travelling Expenses and Remission of Charges (Amendment) Regulations (Northern Ireland) 2007 (S.R. 2007 No. 264)
- Air Quality Standards Regulations (Northern Ireland) 2007 (S.R. 2007 No. 265)
- Housing Benefit (Miscellaneous Amendments) Regulations (Northern Ireland) 2007 (S.R. 2007 No. 266)
- Health and Social Services Trusts (Establishment) (Amendment) Order (Northern Ireland) 2007 (S.R. 2007 No. 269)
- Pig Carcase (Grading) (Amendment) Regulations (Northern Ireland) 2007 (S.R. 2007 No. 271)
- Sulphur Content of Liquid Fuels Regulations (Northern Ireland) 2007 (S.R. 2007 No. 272)
- Phosphorus (Use in Agriculture) (Amendment) Regulations (Northern Ireland) 2007 (S.R. 2007 No. 273)
- Foyle Area and Carlingford Area (Angling) (Amendment) Regulations 2007 (S.R. 2007 No. 274)
- Foyle Area (Control of Drift and Draft Net Fishing) (Amendment) Regulations 2007 (S.R. 2007 No. 275)
- Foyle Area (Control of Netting) (Amendment) Regulations 2007 (S.R. 2007 No. 276)
- Foyle Area and Carlingford Area (Licensing of Fishing Engines) (Amendment No. 2) Regulations 2007 (S.R. 2007 No. 277)
- Foyle Area and Carlingford Area (Tagging and Logbook) (Amendment) Regulations 2007 (S.R. 2007 No. 278)
- Transport of Animals and Poultry (Cleansing and Disinfection) Order (Northern Ireland) 2007 (S.R. 2007 No. 279)
- Water and Sewerage Charges Scheme (No. 2) Regulations (Northern Ireland) 2007 (S.R. 2007 No. 280)
- Pollution of Water: Offences (Determination of Liability) Regulations (Northern Ireland) 2007 (S.R. 2007 No. 281)
- Water and Sewerage Services (2006 Order) (Commencement No. 2) Order (Northern Ireland) 2007 (S.R. 2007 No. 282)
- Energy (2003 Order) (Commencement No. 4) Order (Northern Ireland) 2007 (S.R. 2007 No. 283)
- Electricity (Single Wholesale Market) (2007 Order) (Commencement No. 1) Order (Northern Ireland) 2007 (S.R. 2007 No. 284)
- Electricity (Applications for Licences and Extensions of Licences) Regulations (Northern Ireland) 2007 (S.R. 2007 No. 285)
- Transfer of State Pensions and Benefits Regulations (Northern Ireland) 2007 (S.R. 2007 No. 286)
- Pharmaceutical Society of Northern Ireland (General) (Amendment) Regulations (Northern Ireland) 2007 (S.R. 2007 No. 287)
- Education (Prohibition from Teaching or Working with Children) Regulations (Northern Ireland) 2007 (S.R. 2007 No. 288)
- Electricity (Applications for Licences and Extensions of Licences) (No. 2) Regulations (Northern Ireland) 2007 (S.R. 2007 No. 289)
- Industrial Court (Proceedings) Rules (Northern Ireland) 2007 (S.R. 2007 No. 290)
- Construction (Design and Management) Regulations (Northern Ireland) 2007 (S.R. 2007 No. 291)
- General Dental Services (Amendment) Regulations (Northern Ireland) 2007 (S.R. 2007 No. 292)
- Education (Student Support) (Amendment) Regulations (Northern Ireland) 2007 (S.R. 2007 No. 293)
- Waste (Amendment) (2007 Order) (Commencement No. 1) Order (Northern Ireland) 2007 (S.R. 2007 No. 294)
- Social Security (Netherlands) Order (Northern Ireland) 2007 (S.R. 2007 No. 295)
- Legal Aid in Criminal Proceedings (Costs) (Amendment) Rules (Northern Ireland) 2007 (S.R. 2007 No. 296)
- Register of Occupational and Personal Pension Schemes (Amendment) Regulations (Northern Ireland) 2007 (S.R. 2007 No. 297)
- Social Security (Students and Income-related Benefits) (Amendment) Regulations (Northern Ireland) 2007 (S.R. 2007 No. 298)
- Construction (Use of Explosives) (Amendment) Regulations (Northern Ireland) 2007 (S.R. 2007 No. 299)

== 301-400 ==
- Addition of Vitamins, Minerals and Other Substances Regulations (Northern Ireland) 2007 (S.R. 2007 No. 301)
- Road Traffic (2007 Order) (Commencement No. 1) Order (Northern Ireland) 2007 (S.R. 2007 No. 302)
- Electricity (Single Wholesale Market) (2007 Order) (Commencement No. 2) Order (Northern Ireland) 2007 (S.R. 2007 No. 303)
- Spreadable Fats (Marketing Standards) (Amendment) Regulations (Northern Ireland) 2007 (S.R. 2007 No. 304)
- Social Security (Miscellaneous Amendments No. 2) Regulations (Northern Ireland) 2007 (S.R. 2007 No. 306)
- Bovine Products (Restriction on Placing on the Market) (No. 2) (Amendment) Regulations (Northern Ireland) 2007 (S.R. 2007 No. 307)
- Smoke Control Areas (Exempted Fireplaces) (Amendment) Regulations (Northern Ireland) 2007 (S.R. 2007 No. 308)
- Education (Core Syllabus for Religious Education) Order (Northern Ireland) 2007 (S.R. 2007 No. 309)
- Traffic Signs (Amendment) Regulations (Northern Ireland) 2007 (S.R. 2007 No. 311)
- Harbour Works (Environmental Impact Assessment) (Amendment) Regulations (Northern Ireland) 2007 (S.R. 2007 No. 312)
- Folly Lane, Downpatrick (Stopping- Up Order) (Northern Ireland) 2007 (S.R. 2007 313)
- Products of Animal Origin (Third Country Imports) (Amendment) Regulations (Northern Ireland) 2007 (S.R. 2007 No. 314)
- Newton Heights, Belfast (Footpath) (Abandonment) Order (Northern Ireland) 2007 (S.R. 2007 315)
- Elgin Street, Belfast (Footpath) (Abandonment) Order (Northern Ireland) 2007 (S.R. 2007 316)
- Motor Vehicles (Driving Licences) (Amendment No. 2) Regulations (Northern Ireland) 2007 (S.R. 2007 No. 317)
- Road Traffic (Fixed Penalty) (Offences) (Amendment) Order (Northern Ireland) 2007 (S.R. 2007 No. 318)
- Road Traffic (Fixed Penalty) Order (Northern Ireland) 2007 (S.R. 2007 No. 319)
- Energy (2003 Order) (Commencement No. 5) Order (Northern Ireland) 2007 (S.R. 2007 No. 320)
- Electricity Regulations (Northern Ireland) 2007 (S.R. 2007 No. 321)
- Electricity (Class Exemptions from the Requirement for a Licence) Order (Northern Ireland) 2007 (S.R. 2007 No. 322)
- Road Transport (Working Time) (Amendment) Regulations (Northern Ireland) 2007 (S.R. 2007 No. 323)
- Family Proceedings (Amendment) Rules (Northern Ireland) 2007 (S.R. 2007 No. 324)
- Miscellaneous Food Additives and the Sweeteners in Food (Amendment) Regulations (Northern Ireland) 2007 (S.R. 2007 No. 325)
- Student Fees (Qualifying Courses and Persons) (2006 Regulations) (Amendment) Regulations (Northern Ireland) 2007 (S.R. 2007 No. 326)
- Animals and Animal Products (Import and Export) (Circuses and Avian Quarantine) Regulations (Northern Ireland) 2007 (S.R. 2007 No. 327)
- Student Fees (Qualifying Courses and Persons) Regulations (Northern Ireland) 2007 (S.R. 2007 No. 328)
- Education (Student Loans) (Amendment) Regulations (Northern Ireland) 2007 (S.R. 2007 No. 329)
- Social Security (Claims and Payments) (Amendment No. 3) Regulations (Northern Ireland) 2007 (S.R. 2007 No. 330)
- Health Protection Agency Order (Northern Ireland) 2007 (S.R. 2007 No. 331)
- Social Security (Miscellaneous Amendments No. 3) Regulations (Northern Ireland) 2007 (S.R. 2007 No. 332)
- Plant Health (Amendment) Order (Northern Ireland) 2007 (S.R. 2007 No. 333)
- Protection of Children and Vulnerable Adults (2003 Order) (Commencement No. 3) Order (Northern Ireland) 2007 (S.R. 2007 No. 334)
- Welfare Reform (2007 Act) (Commencement No. 1) Order (Northern Ireland) 2007 (S.R. 2007 No. 335)
- Students Awards (Amendment) Regulations (Northern Ireland) 2007 (S.R. 2007 No. 336)
- Pneumoconiosis, etc., (Workers' Compensation) (Prescribed Occupations) Order (Northern Ireland) 2007 (S.R. 2007 No. 337)
- Occupational Pension Schemes (Winding Up, Winding Up Notices and Reports, etc.) (Amendment) Regulations (Northern Ireland) 200 S.R. 2007 No. 338)
- Transmissible Spongiform Encephalopathies (Amendment) Regulations (Northern Ireland) 2007 (S.R. 2007 No. 339)
- Working Time (Amendment) Regulations (Northern Ireland) 2007 (S.R. 2007 No. 340)
- Social Security (Industrial Injuries) (Prescribed Diseases) (Amendment No. 2) Regulations (Northern Ireland) 2007 (S.R. 2007 No. 341)
- Further Education (Student Support) (Eligibility) Regulations (Northern Ireland) 2007 (S.R. 2007 No. 342)
- Industrial Training Levy (Construction Industry) Order (Northern Ireland) 2007 (S.R. 2007 No. 343)
- Company and Business Names (Amendment) Regulations (Northern Ireland) 2007 (S.R. 2007 No. 344)
- Conservation (Natural Habitats, etc.) (Amendment) Regulations (Northern Ireland) 2007 (S.R. 2007 No. 345)
- Roads (Environmental Impact Assessment) Regulations (Northern Ireland) 2007 (S.R. 2007 No. 346)
- Child Support (Miscellaneous Amendments) Regulations (Northern Ireland) 2007 (S.R. 2007 No. 347)
- Misuse of Drugs and Misuse of Drugs (Safe Custody) (Amendment) Regulations (Northern Ireland) 2007 (S.R. 2007 No. 348)
- Nutrition and Health Claims Regulations (Northern Ireland) 2007 (S.R. 2007 No. 349)
- Route U1541 Creevangar Road, Omagh (Abandonment) Order (Northern Ireland) 2007 (S.R. 2007 350)
- Queens Road, Antrim (Abandonment) Order (Northern Ireland) 2007 (S.R. 2007 351)
- Food (Suspension of the Use of E 128 Red 2G as Food Colour) Regulations (Northern Ireland) 2007 (S.R. 2007 No. 352)
- Pig Production Development Committee (Winding Up) Order (Northern Ireland) 2007 (S.R. 2007 No. 354)
- Environmental Impact Assessment (Forestry) (Amendment) Regulations (Northern Ireland) 2007 (S.R. 2007 No. 355)
- Thornhill Road, Dungannon (Abandonment) Order (Northern Ireland) 2007 (S.R. 2007 356)
- Export Restrictions (Foot-and-Mouth Disease) Regulations (Northern Ireland) 2007 (S.R. 2007 No. 357)
- Education (Student Loans) (Repayment) (Amendment) Regulations (Northern Ireland) 2007 (S.R. 2007 No. 360)
- Less Favoured Area Compensatory Allowances (No. 2) Regulations (Northern Ireland) 2007 (S.R. 2007 No. 361)
- Social Security (1989 Order) (Commencement No. 4) Order (Northern Ireland) 2007 (S.R. 2007 No. 362)
- Education (Student Support) (Amendment) (No. 2) Regulations (Northern Ireland) 2007 (S.R. 2007 No. 363)
- Export Restrictions (Foot-and-Mouth Disease) (Amendment) Regulations (Northern Ireland) 2007 (S.R. 2007 No. 364)
- Street Works (2007 Amendment Order) (Commencement No. 1) Order (Northern Ireland) 2007 (S.R. 2007 No. 365)
- Shaftesbury Road, Bangor (Abandonment) Order (Northern Ireland) 2007 (S.R. 2007 368)
- B82 Killadeas Road, Kesh (Abandonment) Order (Northern Ireland) 2007 (S.R. 2007 369)
- A2 Clooney Road, Faughanvale (Abandonment) Order (Northern Ireland) 2007 (S.R. 2007 370)
- Police (Northern Ireland) Act 2003 (Commencement No.3) Order 2007 (S.R. 2007 No. 371)
- Local Government Pension Scheme (Amendment No. 2) Regulations (Northern Ireland) 2007 (S.R. 2007 No. 372)
- Student Fees (Qualifying Courses and Persons) (Amendment) Regulations (Northern Ireland) 2007 (S.R. 2007 No. 375)
- Supreme Court Fees (Amendment) Order (Northern Ireland) 2007 (S.R. 2007 No. 376)
- Supreme Court (Non-Contentious Probate) Fees (Amendment) Order (Northern Ireland) 2007 (S.R. 2007 No. 377)
- County Court Fees (Amendment) Order (Northern Ireland) 2007 (S.R. 2007 No. 378)
- Magistrates' Courts Fees (Amendment) Order (Northern Ireland) 2007 (S.R. 2007 No. 379)
- Judgment Enforcement Fees (Amendment) Order (Northern Ireland) 2007 (S.R. 2007 No. 380)
- Family Proceedings Fees (Amendment) Order (Northern Ireland) 2007 (S.R. 2007 No. 381)
- Independent Living Fund (2006) Order (Northern Ireland) 2007 (S.R. 2007 No. 382)
- Measuring Instruments (Automatic Catchweighers) (Use for Trade) Regulations (Northern Ireland) 2007 (S.R. 2007 No. 383)
- Measuring Instruments (Automatic Gravimetric Filling Instruments) (Use for Trade) Regulations (Northern Ireland) 2007 (S.R. 2007 No. 384)
- Measuring Instruments (Liquid Fuel and Lubricants) (Use for Trade) Regulations (Northern Ireland) 2007 (S.R. 2007 No. 385)
- Measuring Instruments (Beltweighers) (Use for Trade) Regulations (Northern Ireland) 2007 (S.R. 2007 No. 386)
- Measuring Instruments (Capacity Serving Measures) (Use for Trade) Regulations (Northern Ireland) 2007 (S.R. 2007 No. 387)
- Measuring Instruments (Liquid Fuel by Road Tanker) (Use for Trade) Regulations (Northern Ireland) 2007 (S.R. 2007 No. 388)
- Measuring Instruments (Automatic Discontinuous Totalisers) (Use for Trade) Regulations (Northern Ireland) 2007 (S.R. 2007 No. 389)
- Measuring Instruments (Material Measures of Length) (Use for Trade) Regulations (Northern Ireland) 2007 (S.R. 2007 No. 390)
- Measuring Equipment (Liquid Fuel and Lubricants) (Amendment) Regulations (Northern Ireland) 2007 (S.R. 2007 No. 391)
- Social Security (Miscellaneous Amendments No. 4) Regulations (Northern Ireland) 2007 (S.R. 2007 No. 392)
- Flexible Working (Eligibility, Complaints and Remedies) (Amendment) (No. 2) Regulations (Northern Ireland) 2007 (S.R. 2007 No. 393)
- Companies (Tables A to F) (Amendment) Regulations (Northern Ireland) 2007 (S.R. 2007 No. 394)
- Social Security (National Insurance Credits) (Amendment) Regulations (Northern Ireland) 2007 (S.R. 2007 No. 395)
- Social Security (Miscellaneous Amendments No. 5) Regulations (Northern Ireland) 2007 (S.R. 2007 No. 396)
- Magistrates' Courts (Children (Northern Ireland) Order 1995) (Amendment) Rules (Northern Ireland) 2007 (S.R. 2007 No. 397)
- Magistrates' Courts (Domestic Proceedings) (Amendment) Rules (Northern Ireland) 2007 (S.R. 2007 No. 398)
- Export Restrictions (Foot-and-Mouth Disease) (Amendment No. 2) Regulations (Northern Ireland) 2007 (S.R. 2007 No. 399)
- Marketing of Vegetable Plant Material (Amendment) Regulations (Northern Ireland) 2007 (S.R. 2007 No. 400)

== 401-500 ==
- Seed Potatoes (Amendment) Regulations (Northern Ireland) 2007 (S.R. 2007 No. 401)
- General Teaching Council for Northern Ireland (Approval of Qualifications) Regulations (Northern Ireland) 2007 (S.R. 2007 No. 402)
- Health and Safety at Work Order (Application to Environmentally Hazardous Substances) (Amendment) Regulations (Northern Ireland) 2007 (S.R. 2007 No. 403)
- Motor Vehicles (Construction and Use) (Amendment No. 3) Regulations (Northern Ireland) 2007 (S.R. 2007 No. 404)
- Surface Waters (Fishlife) (Classification) (Amendment) Regulations (Northern Ireland) 2007 (S.R. 2007 No. 405)
- Gas (Designation of Pipelines) Order (Northern Ireland) 2007 (S.R. 2007 No. 406)
- Sea Fishing (Restriction on Days at Sea) Order (Northern Ireland) 2007 (S.R. 2007 No. 407)
- Food for Particular Nutritional Uses (Miscellaneous Amendments) Regulations (Northern Ireland) 2007 (S.R. 2007 No. 408)
- Lands Tribunal (Amendment) Rules (Northern Ireland) 2007 (S.R. 2007 No. 409)
- Agriculture (Student fees) (Amendment) Regulations (Northern Ireland) 2007 (S.R. 2007 No. 410)
- College Park, Belfast (Abandonment) Order (Northern Ireland) 2007 (S.R. 2007 No. 412)
- Finvoy Road, Ballymoney (Abandonment) Order (Northern Ireland) 2007 (S.R. 2007 No. 413)
- Sandholes Road, Cookstown (Abandonment) Order (Northern Ireland) 2007 (S.R. 2007 No. 414)
- A22 Downpatrick Road, Killyleagh (Abandonment) Order (Northern Ireland) 2007 (S.R. 2007 No. 415)
- Game Preservation (Special Protection for Irish Hares) Order (Northern Ireland) 2007 (S.R. 2007 No. 416)
- Agricultural and Forestry Marketing Development Grant Regulations (Northern Ireland) 2007 (S.R. 2007 No. 417)
- Agricultural and Forestry Processing and Marketing Grant Regulations (Northern Ireland) 2007 (S.R. 2007 No. 418)
- Plastic Materials and Articles in Contact with Food (Lid Gaskets) Regulations (Northern Ireland) 2007 (S.R. 2007 No. 419)
- Natural Mineral Water, Spring Water and Bottled Drinking Water Regulations (Northern Ireland) 2007 (S.R. 2007 No. 420)
- Environmental Impact Assessment (Agriculture) Regulations (Northern Ireland) 2007 (S.R. 2007 No. 421)
- U1110 Green Road, Londonderry (Abandonment) Order (Northern Ireland) 2007 (S.R. 2007 No. 422)
- Companies (Tables A to F) (Amendment No. 2) Regulations (Northern Ireland) 2007 (S.R. 2007 No. 425)
- Steelstown Road, Londonderry (Abandonment) Order (Northern Ireland) 2007 4S.R. 2007 No. 426)
- Galgorm Road, Ballymena (Abandonment) Order (Northern Ireland) 2007 (S.R. 2007 No. 427)
- Pesticides (Maximum Residue Levels in Crops, Food and Feeding Stuffs) (Amendment) Regulations (Northern Ireland) 2007 (S.R. 2007 No. 428)
- Welfare Reform (2007 Act) (Commencement No. 2) Order (Northern Ireland) 2007 (S.R. 2007 No. 429)
- Disability Discrimination (2006 Order) (Commencement No. 3) Order (Northern Ireland) 2007 (S.R. 2007 No. 430)
- Social Security (Attendance Allowance and Disability Living Allowance) (Amendment) Regulations (Northern Ireland) 2007 (S.R. 2007 No. 431)
- Planning (General Development) (Amendment No. 2) Order (Northern Ireland) 2007 (S.R. 2007 No. 432)
- Electricity (Class Exemptions from the Requirement for a Licence) (Amendment) Order (Northern Ireland) 2007 (S.R. 2007 No. 433)
- Materials and Articles in Contact with Food Regulations (Northern Ireland) 2007 (S.R. 2007 No. 434)
- Motor Vehicles (Driving Licences) (Fees) (Amendment) Regulations (Northern Ireland) 2007 (S.R. 2007 No. 435)
- General Ophthalmic Services Regulations (Northern Ireland) 2007 (S.R. 2007 No. 436)
- Travelling Expenses and Remission of Charges (Amendment No. 2) Regulations (Northern Ireland) 2007 (S.R. 2007 No. 437)
- Social Security (Ireland) Order (Northern Ireland) 2007 (S.R. 2007 No. 438)
- Road Races (Rally Ireland) Order (Northern Ireland) 2007 (S.R. 2007 No. 439)
- Renewables Obligation (Amendment) Order (Northern Ireland) 2007 (S.R. 2007 No. 440)
- Export Restrictions (Foot-and-Mouth Disease) (Amendment No. 3) Regulations (Northern Ireland) 2007 (S.R. 2007 No. 441)
- Student Fees (Amounts) (Amendment) Regulations (Northern Ireland) 2007 (S.R. 2007 No. 442)
- Contaminants in Food (Amendment) Regulations (Northern Ireland) 2007 (S.R. 2007 No. 443)
- Electricity (Single Wholesale Market) (2007 Order) (Commencement No. 3) Order (Northern Ireland) 2007 (S.R. 2007 No. 444)
- B127 Ballyconnell Road, Derrylin (Abandonment) Order (Northern Ireland) 2007 (S.R. 2007 No. 446)
- Plant Health (Phytophthora ramorum) (Amendment) Order (Northern Ireland) 2007 (S.R. 2007 No. 447)
- Local Government Pension Scheme (Amendment No. 3) Regulations (Northern Ireland) 2007 (S.R. 2007 No. 448)
- Feed (Specified Undesirable Substances) Regulations (Northern Ireland) 2007 (S.R. 2007 No. 450)
- Feed (Corn Gluten Feed and Brewers Grains) (Emergency Control) (Revocation) Regulations (Northern Ireland) 2007 (S.R. 2007 No. 451)
- Administration of Estates (Rights of Surviving Spouse or Civil Partner) Order (Northern Ireland) 2007 (S.R. 2007 No. 452)
- Family Proceedings Fees (Amendment No. 2) Order (Northern Ireland) 2007 (S.R. 2007 No. 453)
- Road Traffic (2007 Order) (Commencement No. 2) Order (Northern Ireland) 2007 (S.R. 2007 No. 454)
- Motor Vehicles (Compulsory Insurance) Regulations (Northern Ireland) 2007 (S.R. 2007 No. 455)
- Occupational Pension Schemes (EEA States) Regulations (Northern Ireland) 2007 (S.R. 2007 No. 457)
- Electricity (Single Wholesale Market) (Amendment) Order (Northern Ireland) 2007 (S.R. 2007 No. 458)
- Belvedere Manor, Belfast (Abandonment) Order (Northern Ireland) 2007 (S.R. 2007 No. 459)
- Motor Vehicles (Third-Party Risks) (Amendment) Regulations (Northern Ireland) 2007 (S.R. 2007 No. 460)
- Road Transport Licensing (Fees) (Amendment) Regulations (Northern Ireland) 2007 (S.R. 2007 No. 461)
- Company and Business Names (Amendment No. 2) Regulations (Northern Ireland) 2007 (S.R. 2007 No. 462)
- B7 Chapel Hill Road, Mayobridge (Abandonment) Order (Northern Ireland) 2007 (S.R. 2007 No. 463)
- Police and Criminal Evidence (Application to Revenue and Customs) Order (Northern Ireland) 2007 (S.R. 2007 No. 464)
- Pesticides (Maximum Residue Levels in Crops, Food and Feeding Stuffs) (Amendment No. 2) Regulations (Northern Ireland) 2007 (S.R. 2007 No. 465)
- Disability Discrimination (2006 Order) (Commencement No. 4) Order (Northern Ireland) 2007 (S.R. 2007 No. 466)
- Social Security (Claims and Information) Regulations (Northern Ireland) 2007 (S.R. 2007 No. 467)
- Children (Allocation of Proceedings) (Amendment) Order (Northern Ireland) 2007 (S.R. 2007 No. 468)
- Family Homes and Domestic Violence (Allocation of Proceedings) (Amendment) Order (Northern Ireland) 2007 (S.R. 2007 No. 469)
- Disability Discrimination (Questions and Replies) Order (Northern Ireland) 2007 (S.R. 2007 No. 470)
- Fisheries (Amendment) Byelaws (Northern Ireland) 2007 (S.R. 2007 No. 471)
- Eel Fishing (Licence Duties) Regulations (Northern Ireland) 2007 (S.R. 2007 No. 472)
- Disability Discrimination (Service Providers and Public Authorities Carrying Out Functions) Regulations (Northern Ireland) 2007 (S.R. 2007 No. 473)
- Disability Discrimination (Premises) Regulations (Northern Ireland) 2007 (S.R. 2007 No. 474)
- Social Security (Housing Costs and Miscellaneous Amendments) Regulations (Northern Ireland) 2007 (S.R. 2007 No. 475)
- Police Pension (Northern Ireland) Regulations 2007 (S.R. 2007 No. 476)
- Local Government Pension Scheme (Amendment No. 4) Regulations (Northern Ireland) 2007 (S.R. 2007 No. 479)
- Motor Hackney Carriages (Belfast) (Amendment) By-Laws (Northern Ireland) 2007 (S.R. 2007 No. 480)
- Motor Vehicles (Construction and Use) (Amendment No. 4) Regulations (Northern Ireland) 2007 (S.R. 2007 No. 481)
- Official Feed and Food Controls Regulations (Northern Ireland) 2007 (S.R. 2007 No. 482)
- Plant Health (Amendment No.2) Order (Northern Ireland) 2007 (S.R. 2007 No. 483)
- Police Service of Northern Ireland Pensions (Amendment) Regulations 2007 (S.R. 2007 No. 484)
- Police Service of Northern Ireland Pensions (Amendment No. 2) Regulations 2007 (S.R. 2007 No. 485)
- Occupational Pensions (Revaluation) Order (Northern Ireland) 2007 (S.R. 2007 No. 486)
- Milk and Milk Products (Pupils in Educational Establishments) (Amendment) Regulations (Northern Ireland) 2007 (S.R. 2007 No. 490)
- Transfer of Undertakings and Service Provision Change (Protection of Employment) (Consequential Amendments etc.) Regulations (Northern Ireland) 2007 (S.R. 2007 No. 494)
- Industrial Court (Proceedings) (Amendment) Rules (Northern Ireland) 2007 (S.R. 2007 No. 495)
- Meat (Official Controls Charges) (No.2) Regulations (Northern Ireland) 2007 (S.R. 2007 No. 496)
- Fishery Products (Official Controls Charges) Regulations (Northern Ireland) 2007 (S.R. 2007 No. 497)
- Food Labelling (Declaration of Allergens) Regulations (Northern Ireland) 2007 (S.R. 2007 No. 498)
- Shrimp Fishing Nets (Amendment) Order (Northern Ireland) 2007 (S.R. 2007 No. 499)
- County Court (Amendment) Rules (Northern Ireland) 2007 (S.R. 2007 No. 500)

== 501-600 ==
- Export Restrictions (Foot-and-Mouth Disease) (Revocation) Regulations (Northern Ireland) 2007 (S.R. 2007 No. 503)
- Devonshire Way and Albert Street, Belfast (Footpaths) (Abandonment) Order (Northern Ireland) 2007 (S.R. 2007 No. 504)
- Local Government (Constituting a Joint Committee a Body Corporate) (Amendment) Order (Northern Ireland) 2007 (S.R. 2007 No. 505)
- Infant Formula and Follow-on Formula Regulations (Northern Ireland) 2007 (S.R. 2007 No. 506)
- Fair Employment (Specification of Public Authorities) (Amendment) Order (Northern Ireland) 2007 (S.R. 2007 No. 507)
