= Mohammad Taha =

Mohammad Taha can refer to:

- Mohammad Taha (cricketer) (born 2000), Pakistani cricketer
- Mohammad Taha (footballer) (born 2005), Jordanian footballer
- Mohammad Taha (Hamas), member of Hamas
- Mohammed Taha Mohammed Ahmed (1965-2006), Sudanese journalist
- Muhammad Taha al-Huwayzi (1899–1968), Iranian-Iraqi poet and teacher
- Mohammed Taha, Indian cricketer
- Mido Taha (Mohamed Taha Ibrahim Abdelrahman Mohamed), Egyptian basketball player
