= Timeline of the 2014 Gaza War =

The following is a timeline of the 2014 Gaza War. Over 2014, Palestinians suffered the highest number of civilian casualties since the Six-Day War in 1967, according to a United Nations report, given the July–August conflict, and rising tolls in the West Bank and East Jerusalem. A spike in Israeli casualties also occurred. 2,256 Palestinians and 85 Israelis died, while 17,125 Palestinians, and 2,639 Israelis suffered injuries.

For events pertaining to the conflict which occurred before 8 July 2014, see Background of the 2014 Israel–Gaza conflict and Operation Brother's Keeper.

== Overview ==
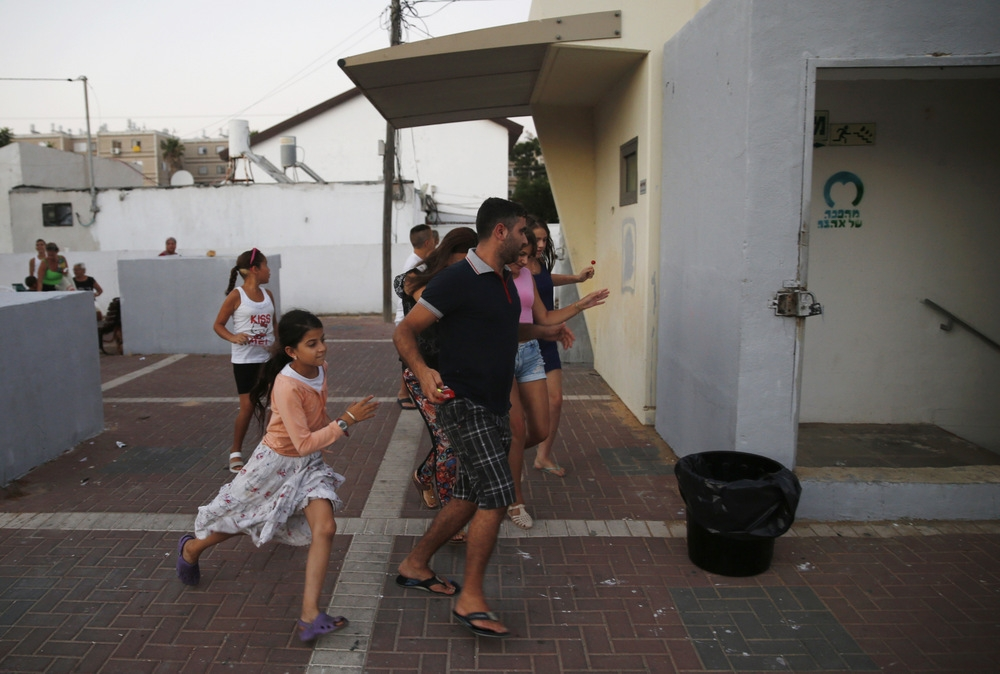
Israeli residents of Ashkelon run for shelter during a rocket alert

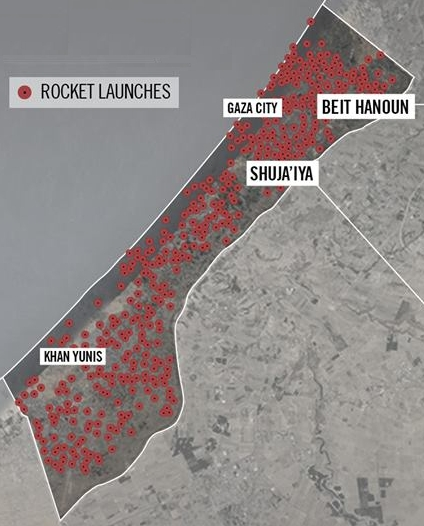
IDF-released map of rocket launch sites in Gaza

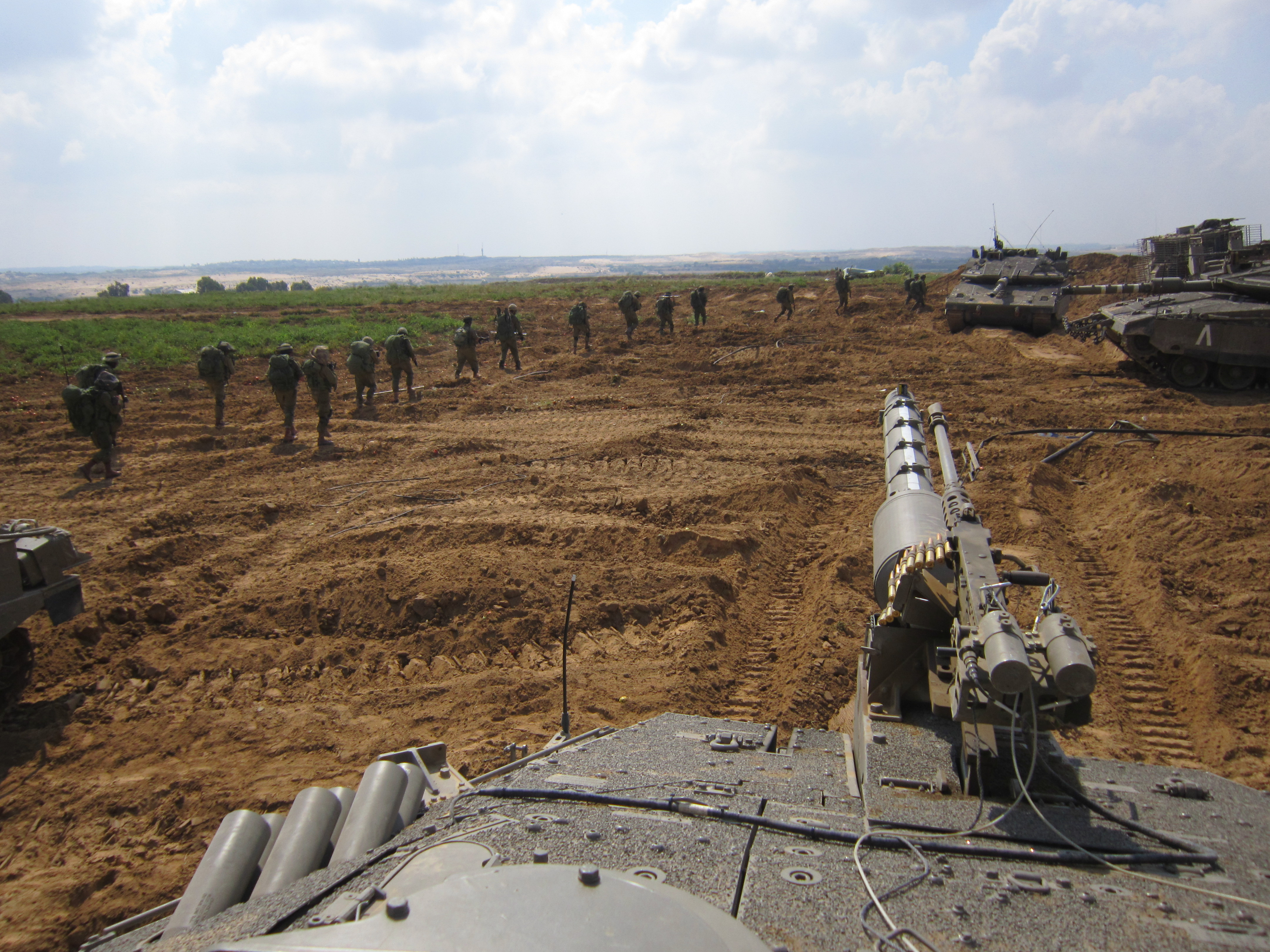
Israeli troops and tanks near the Gaza border

=== Beginning of the conflict ===
On the evening of 12 June 2014, three Israeli teenagers were kidnapped in the West Bank. Israeli leadership has placed the responsibility for their abduction on Hamas. On 30 June, corpses of the teenagers were found. Other commentators, such as Israeli historian Ilan Pappé, and NBC reporter Ayman Mohyeldin, queried the abduction and murder of the Israeli teenagers as being the real start of the chain of events leading to the major conflict. They saw parallels in the earlier killing of two Palestinian teenagers in the Beitunia killings. The autopsy report confirming that live IDF fire had been the cause of death of one of the Palestinian teenagers had become public knowledge the day before the kidnapping of the Israeli teenagers.

The operation was also preceded by the jailing of hundreds of Palestinians, by air strikes on Gaza in which 3 Palestinians were killed and more than a dozen injured, by the killing of at least 6 Palestinians, injuring of dozens, house demolitions and lootings in the West Bank, by the kidnapping and killing of a Palestinian youth, and by massive rocket attacks from the Gaza Strip to southern Israel. In June 2014, 66 rockets were fired in 30 attacks, wounding three people. In the eight first days of July, 250 missiles were fired in 104 attacks, injuring seven people. On 7 July, 80 rockets were fired from the Gaza Strip. On 7 July 2014, the Security Cabinet of Israel decided to begin a "counter-terrorist operation". After an airstrike killed seven Hamas militants in Khan Yunis, Hamas itself assumed responsibility on 7 July for missiles fired from Gaza and launched 40 rockets towards Israel.

=== Phase 1: Air strikes ===
As the Israeli operation began, and the IDF bombarded targets in the Gaza Strip with artillery and airstrikes, Hamas continued to fire rockets and mortar shells into Israel in response. A cease-fire proposal was announced by the Egyptian government on 14 July, backed by Palestinian president Mahmoud Abbas; the Israeli government accepted it and temporarily stopped hostilities on the morning of 15 July, but Hamas rejected it in "its current form", citing the fact Hamas has not been consulted in the formation of the ceasefire and it omitted many of their demands. By 16 July, the death toll within Gaza had surpassed 200 people.

=== Phase 2: Ground invasion ===
On 16 July, Hamas and Islamic Jihad offered the Israeli government a 10-year truce with ten conditions centred on the lifting of the blockade and the release of prisoners who were released in the Gilad Shalit prisoner swap and were re-arrested; it was not accepted. On 17 July, a five-hour humanitarian ceasefire, proposed by the UN, took place. Approximately five and a half hours prior to the ceasefire's effect, the IDF sighted 13 armed Hamas militants emerging from a Gazan tunnel on the Israeli side of the Gaza border. IDF destroyed the tunnel's exit, ending the incursion. After the ceasefire, IDF began a ground offensive on the Gaza Strip focused on destroying tunnels crossing the Israel border. On 20 July, the Israeli military entered Shuja'iyya, a populous neighborhood of Gaza City, resulting in heavy fighting.

On 24 July, over 10,000 Palestinians in the West Bank protested against the Israeli operation; 2 Palestinian protesters were killed. 150 Hamas militants who surrendered to the IDF were being questioned about Hamas operations. On 25 July, an Israeli airstrike killed Salah Abu Hassanein, the leader of Islamic Jihad's military wing. On 26 July, another humanitarian ceasefire took place for twelve hours, followed by a unilateral extension by Israel for another twenty-four hours, which was rejected by Hamas. The Palestinian death toll in the Gaza Strip topped 1,000.

On 1 August, the US and UN announced that Israel and Hamas had agreed to a 72-hour ceasefire starting at 08:00. There was dispute about the terms of the ceasefire: Israel and the US stated that they allowed Israel to "continue to do operations to destroy tunnels that pose a threat to Israeli territory that lead from the Gaza Strip into Israel proper as long as those tunnels exist on the Israel side of their lines"; Hamas said that it would not accept such a condition. The ceasefire broke down almost immediately after it started. Israel blamed Hamas for violating the ceasefire, saying a group of Israeli soldiers were attacked by Palestinian militants emerging from a tunnel. Palestinians said the IDF was the first to breach the ceasefire when at 08:30 it destroyed 19 buildings while undertaking work to demolish tunnels. According to the PLO, the Palestinian Authority and Gazan sources, Hamas attacked an Israeli unit, killing an Israeli officer (Hadar Goldin, who was initially thought to have been captured) while Israeli forces were still engaged in military activities in Rafah on Gaza's territory before the truce came into effect. Tweets reported the battle in Rafah before the deadline for the cease-fire. Hamas also killed two soldiers in a suicide bombing attack. Senior Hamas leader Moussa Abu Marzouk accused Israel of creating pretexts to undermine the Gaza ceasefire and said that Palestinian fighters abducted the officer and killed the two soldiers before the start of the humanitarian truce, which a Hamas witness has stated began at 7:30 and lasted five minutes, while Israel said the event took place at 09:20, after the 08:00 start of the ceasefire.

=== Phase 3: Withdrawal of Israeli troops ===
On 3 August, IDF pulled most of its ground forces out of the Gaza Strip after completing the destruction of 32 tunnels built by Hamas and other militants. On 5 August, Israel announced that it had arrested Hossam Kawasmeh on 11 July, and suspected him of having organized the killing of the three teenagers. According to court documents, Kawasmeh stated that Hamas members in Gaza financed the recruitment and arming of the killers.

On 10 August, another Egyptian proposal for a 72-hour ceasefire was negotiated and agreed upon Israeli and Palestinian officials, and on 13 August it was extended for another 120 hours to allow both sides to continue negotiations for a long-term solution to end the month-long fighting. On 19 August, a 24-hour ceasefire extension renewal was violated just hours after agreement with 29 Hamas rockets fired in 20 minutes, with IAF airstrikes in response, killing 9 Gazans. The Israeli delegation was ordered home from Cairo.

On 20 August, a Hamas official in exile in Turkey, Saleh al-Arouri, claimed responsibility for the kidnapping and the murder in an address he delivered on behalf of Khaled Mashal at the conference of the International Union of Muslim Scholars in Istanbul, a move that might reflect a desire by Hamas to gain leverage. In the address, he said: "Our goal was to ignite an intifada in the West Bank and Jerusalem, as well as within the 1948 borders... Your brothers in the Al-Qassam Brigades carried out this operation to support their imprisoned brothers, who were on a hunger strike... The mujahideen captured these settlers in order to have a swap deal." Hamas leader Khaled Mashal accepted that members of Hamas were responsible, stating that he knew nothing of it in advance and that what the leadership knew of the details came from reading Israeli reports. Meshaal, who has headed Hamas' exiled political wing since 2004, has denied being involved in the "details" of Hamas "military issues", but "justified the killings as a legitimate action against Israelis on "occupied" lands."

On 21 August, an Israeli airstrike in Rafah killed three of Hamas's top commanders: Mohammed Abu Shammala, Raed al Atar and Mohammed Barhoum. During the period from 22 to 26 August, over 700 rockets and mortar shells fired into Israel, killing 3 Israelis. On 26 August, Israel and Hamas accepted another cease-fire at 19:00.

=== Result and post-conflict events ===
On 16 September, a mortar shell was fired to Israel for the first time since the cease-fire commenced. Defense Minister Moshe Ya'alon reassured border town populations that fighting would not resume with the Gaza Strip at the end of this month, the same time of year as the Jewish new year.

According to Palestinians on 1 October, Israeli forces entered the Gaza Strip and fired upon Palestinian farmers and farms. No injuries were reported.

IDF reported that on 31 October a rocket or a mortar shell was launched from Gaza into southern Israel without causing harm.

On 23 November, a Palestinian farmer was shot dead in Gaza, marking the first time a Palestinian from Gaza had been killed by Israeli fire since the seven-week war between Israel and Hamas militants ended with an Egyptian-brokered ceasefire on 26 August. The Israeli army said two Palestinians had approached the border fence and had ignored calls to halt, prompting troops to fire warning shots in the air. "Once they didn't comply, they fired towards their lower extremities. There was one hit," a spokeswoman said.

== Timeline, weeks 1–4 (7 July – 4 August) ==
=== Week 1 ===
==== 7 July ====
After an Israeli Air Force strike killed 7 Hamas militants in the Gaza Strip the day before, Hamas responded by launching rockets and assumed responsibility for all rockets fired from Gaza. In preparations for a potential escalation in fighting, the Israeli Defense Force (IDF) called up 1,500 reserves on 7 July. These reserves were positioned around southern Israel and were working on training in case of escalation.

==== 8 July ====
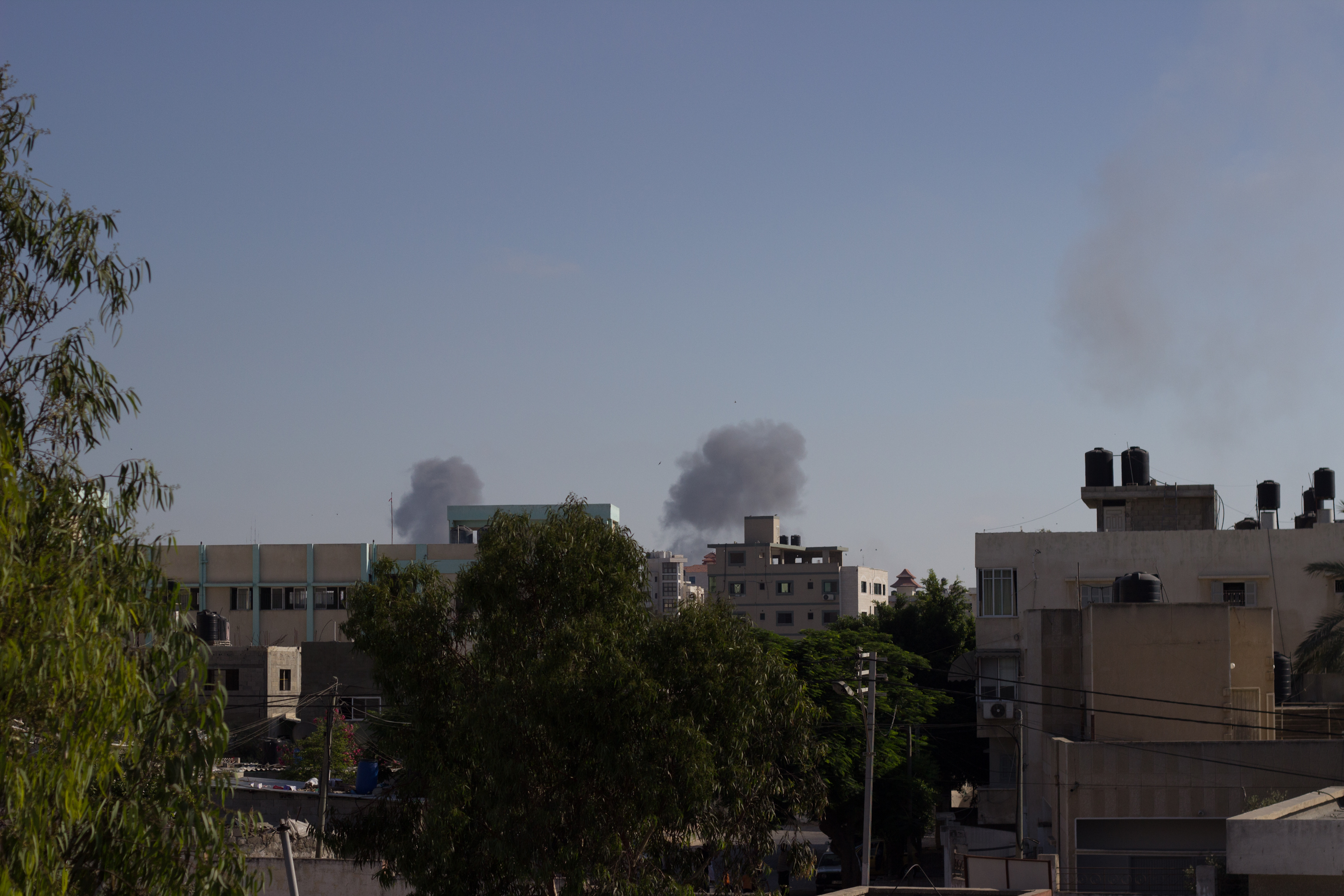
Israeli Air Forces bombing over Ansar site, 8 July 2014

The IDF continued calling up additional reserves on 8 July, stating plans to call up 40,000 or more. Due to the rocket fire from the Gaza Strip into Israel, the IDF Home Front Command closed all summer camps and banned gatherings of more than 300 people within 40 km of Gaza, while universities suspended studies and final exams, and people were cautioned to stay close to shelter. In Gaza, 37,000 students who had completed high school had their graduation delayed.

In the early morning of 8 July, Israel announced it had struck at least 50 targets in Gaza overnight Monday, injuring 17 people. In the Central Gaza Strip, 13 IAF airstrikes, with 16 missiles, struck numerous targets. In Gaza City, 9 airstrikes involving 11 missiles struck militant sites, agricultural plots and a blacksmith workshop. In the Northern Gaza Strip, 36 airstrikes using 45 missiles targeted numerous houses and militant training sites, and a poultry farm. In Khan Yunis 7 airstrikes using 18 missiles demolished 3 houses, with collateral damage to nearby homes. In Rafah 4 airstrikes involving 9 missiles hit 2 houses and agricultural sites.

A force of five Hamas naval commandos landed on a beach in Israel near kibbutz Zikim and advanced toward an IDF command post. Israeli infantry, aircraft, and a naval vessel engaged the Hamas commandos, killing all five. A short while later, a parachute was found abandoned near Yad Mordechai and a Gaza tunnel exploded near Kerem Shalom.

This was followed by Prime Minister Binyamin Netanyahu instructing the IDF to "take their gloves off" against Hamas and instructed them to take any means necessary to restore peace to Israeli citizens. As the afternoon progressed, the IDF continued their targeted retaliation, including the home of senior Hamas member Abdul Rahman Juda, which served as a command and control center.

Additionally, the IDF targeted and killed Muhammad Sa'aban a commander of Hamas's naval commando unit. The IDF targeted the homes of Hamas members Eiad Sakik, Abdullah Hshash, Samer Abu Daka, and Hassan Abdullah. The Palestinians confirmed that all homes were called by the IDF prior to being hit, asking residents to leave. The IDF assassinated Islamic Jihad commander Hafez Hamad, who was a commander in its military wing in Beit Hanoun, in an airstrike on his home.

Late afternoon, Hamas announced that all Israelis are now legitimate targets. Early evening, the Iron Dome Defense system shot down a rocket over Tel Aviv.

Hamas, in the evening, held a press conference to express their demands to stop their offense on Israel. Hamas demanded that Israel halt what it termed aggression in Jerusalem; the West Bank; and the Gaza Strip, re-release of the prisoners of the Gilad Shalit deal, and re-commit to all the terms of the Operation Pillar of Defense cease-fire. Hamas claimed responsibility for rocket fire. In addition, the Islamic Jihad (PIJ) claimed responsibility for 60 rockets, the Popular Resistance Committees asserted they had fired 17, and the Democratic Front for the Liberation of Palestine claimed responsibility for three.

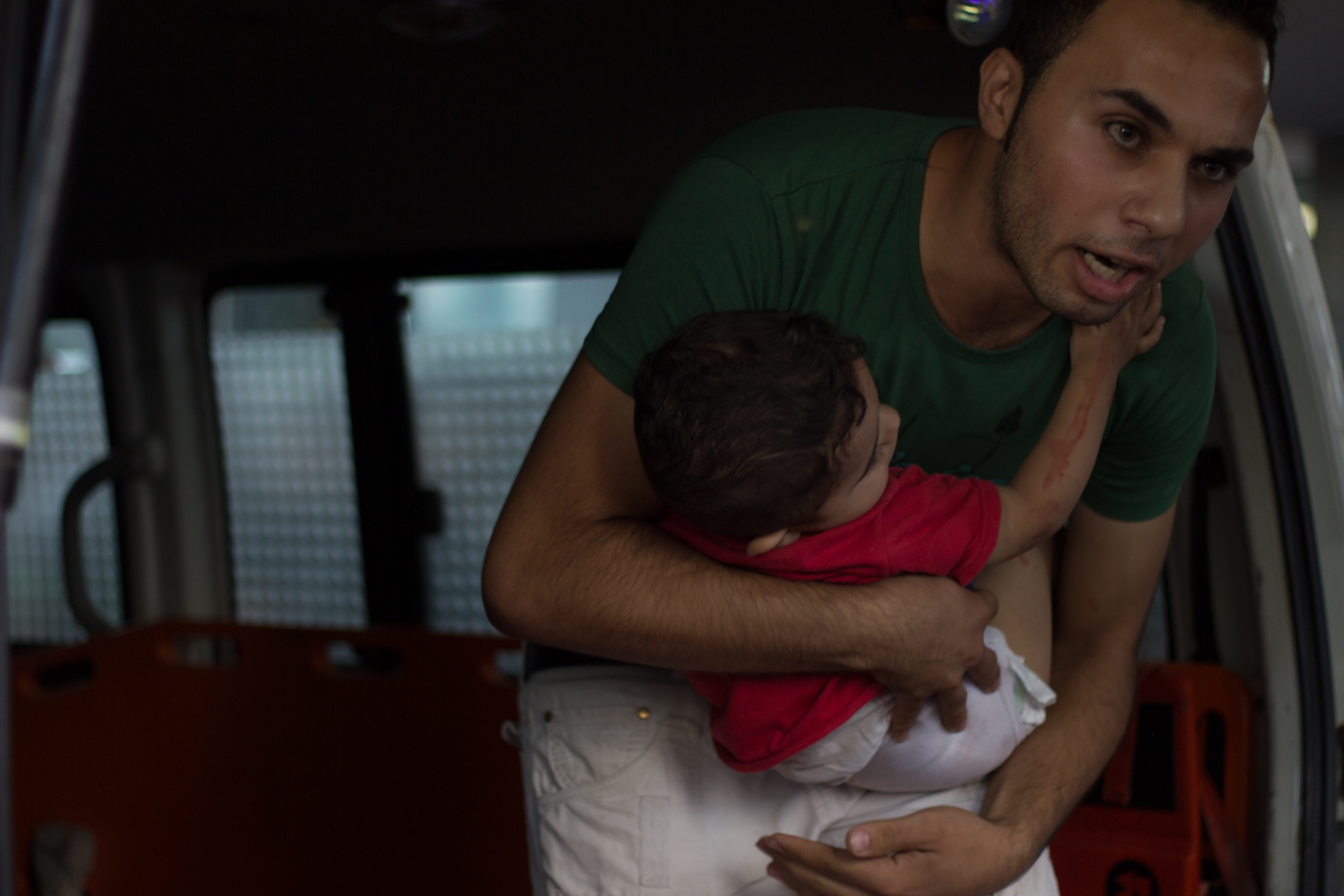
Palestinian man with child, 8 July

Late in the evening, a second rocket was shot down over Tel Aviv. Following this air sirens went off in Binyamina and Hamas stated that a rocket was fired at Haifa. This was all followed by several rockets being fired at Jerusalem and two landing just outside Jerusalem. Just before midnight, a rocket hit Hadera, 28 miles (45 km) north of Tel Aviv, making it the longest range rocket ever shot into Israel. Upon investigation of the shrapnel, Israel determined it was a Syrian-made M302 Rocket.

By the end of 8 July, Israeli Air Force (IAF) and the Israeli Navy had struck 435 targets in Gaza, resulting in the death of at least 23 Palestinians, including two children under five, and over 122 injuries. Also, during the first day 225 rockets were fired from Gaza into Israel and 40 of out of 225 were intercepted.

Property damage in Israel totaled approximately 10 million NIS, from 35 vehicles, 52 buildings, 12 agriculture-related instances of damage reported.

==== 9 July ====
Just after midnight on 9 July, President Mahmoud Abbas announced he would convene an emergency meeting of the Palestinian leadership to discuss the escalation, in addition to contacting Egyptian President Abdel-Fattah el-Sissi to attempt to broker a ceasefire.

The IDF confirmed that overnight it struck 160 targets in Gaza, bringing the total to 435 sites that Israel has struck, while from Gaza 235 rockets have been fired. Overnight in Rafah 95 airstrikes, with 130 missiles, targeted houses, militant training sites and border tunnels. In Khan Yunis, 74 airstrikes struck 9 houses, 2 mosque minarets, and militant sites with 80 missiles. In the Central Gaza Strip, 20 airstrikes using 30 missiles destroyed 4 houses. Also targeted were militants and agricultural plots. 65 Palestinians were wounded. In Gaza City, 42 airstrikes, employing 75 missiles, struck various targets. In the Northern Gaza Strip 112 airstrikes were launched with 114 missiles, destroying 6 houses, killing 8 and injuring a further 89. On the morning of 9 July the IDF confirmed that two further rockets had been shot down over Tel Aviv.

In an interview given to The Guardian published in the morning, a spokesperson for Medical Aid for Palestinians stated that at least seven children have died as a result of Israeli air strikes so far.

In the afternoon, the Iron Dome shot down a rocket over Zichron Yaakov, 120 km (75 miles) from the Gaza border. This was immediately followed by two rockets landing in the Mount Carmel region, just short of Haifa; Hamas said they were responsible, and that Gaza had been hit 500 times in the past two days. The IDF announced that they had struck 129 targets in Gaza including Palestinian militants, rocket launchers, weapons stores, tunnels and command centers.

In the early evening two rockets, believed by Israel to have been aimed at Haifa, landed in an open field in Caesarea. Israel struck a house in Gaza, killing a mother and her two children. Palestinians reported that the Islamic Jihad Communications Commander was killed in IAF strike on his house. Following the Israeli attacks on Gaza, the death toll rose to 43; Abbas called the operation an Israeli genocide. Within the first 36 hours of Operation Protective Edge, Israel hit more targets in Gaza than they had in the full eight days of Operation Pillar of Defense.

As night fell, Hamas fired multiple rockets toward Dimona, which they said were attempting to hit the nuclear reactors. Israel continued to strike Gaza; Palestinian casualties rose to 51 dead and 450 injuries Over the same period, Magen David Adom reported that there had been no Israeli deaths and 68 injuries, 59 from shock and nine while running for shelter.

As the second day came to an end, the IDF announced that it had hit over 550 targets in Gaza over the first two days. Hamas fired approximately 180 rockets into Israel during the second day. Palestinian casualties were 68 dead and 550 injured (some of them civilians).

==== 10 July ====
Shortly after midnight, the United Nations Security Council announced that it would hold a special meeting to discuss the current Israel–Palestinian conflict. Several hours later, Ban Ki-moon announced that he would be addressing the Security Council and that he had already spoken with several world leaders.

Throughout the night, Israel continued their targeted attacks on Gaza, hitting several sites, resulting in 14 additional deaths, including some women and children. Overnight in the Northern Gaza Strip, 111 airstrikes, involving 120 missiles, struck 15 houses and other targets, with 9 deaths and 51 wounded. In Gaza City, 46 airstrikes, using 54 missiles, hit 14 houses, 2 security sites and a press vehicle, resulting in 10 fatalities and 70 injured. In the Central Gaza Strip, 30 airstrikes, with 33 missiles, demolished 9 houses and struck police stations, resulting in 7 fatalities and 25 wounded. In Khan Yunis, 57 airstrikes demolished 12 houses and a beach resort killing 19 civilians. Israel vowed to intensify the attacks as the operation enters its third day. Eight of those killed were members of the Kaware family. Israel announced that although the family was warned, and they did leave the house, they returned after the warning shot hit the house. They returned home moments after the second rocket was fired and it was too late to reprogram. In total 320 sites in Gaza were hit overnight.

On the morning of 10 July, Gazan rockets were fired at Tel Aviv, Dimona, Mitzpe Ramon, Eshkol, Ashkelon, Netivot, Yeruham, and other locations. Finance Minister Yair Lapid warned that there would be an IDF ground operation if the rocket fire did not stop. During the morning of 10 July, an IDF Spokesman said that since the beginning of the operation in Israel 234 missiles had exploded and 61 rockets had been hit by the counter-rocket defense system Iron Dome. Israel additionally issued a warning to the 100,000 residents of Gaza near the border with Israel to evacuate their homes, leading many to believe that preparations for an Israeli ground offensive are underway.

In the early afternoon, at an IDF checkpoint on Highway 5, a car with Palestinian plates carrying Palestinians Arabs was stopped. The car contained two cooking gas tanks connected to what is believed to be a detonation device. Shin Bet is investigating what is believed to have been a car bomb. One of the two suspects later confessed they intended to perpetrate a terror attack.

In the late afternoon, an Israeli airstrike killed three Islamic Jihad members, Mahmoud Walud, Hazm Balusha, and Alla'a Abd al-Nabi, whom Israel holds responsible for rockets fired at Tel Aviv. With this strike, the total number of Palestinians killed in day three of the operation reached 33. The IDF also announced that 96 rockets had been fired from Gaza on 10 July and that 442 rockets had been launched over the past three days.

In the early evening, siren went off around Jerusalem, for the second time in the three-day-old operation. Two rockets were shot down over Jerusalem by the Iron Dome and one landed in the Abu Ghosh area.

In the evening, the US Consulate General in Jerusalem announced aid for any US citizens in Gaza who wished to leave. The US Consulate announcement came as Israel announced it would intensify the strikes in Gaza. Additionally, Israel announced that their goal is not a ceasefire, but that they want to fully dismantle Hamas's infrastructure.

As in the past few nights, militants from Gaza chose to shoot a large number of rockets into Israel during the 20:00 news broadcast, with tonight's resulting in a number of injuries after a direct hit on a house. Initial reports indicated that an Israeli was killed when a rocket hit their car; however this was later proven to be untrue as the car was empty, and the Israeli death count remained at zero since the operation started.

As the third day of fighting came to an end, Israel announced that 144 rockets had been shot at Israel on 10 July, and 442 since the operation started. This rocket fire has resulted in injuries to 123 people; one seriously, 21 moderately to lightly and 101 from shock. Israel had struck 201 targets In Gaza, resulting in 23 deaths and carried out almost 900 airstrikes on the Gaza strip since the start of the operation, killing at least 100 Palestinians (some of whom were civilians).

Hamas stated that they are ready for a long battle and that they plan a ground operation to free Palestinian prisoners.

==== 11 July ====
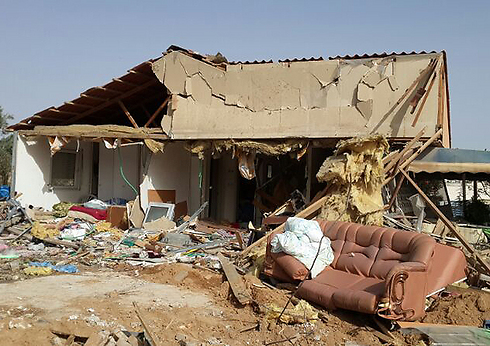
The remains of a building in Beersheba (Israel), after a direct hit from a rocket in the fourth day of the Operation, (11 July 2014)

Overnight, in the Northern Gaza Strip 45 airstrikes hit 5 houses, 7 offices, 2 security sites, and militants. UNRWA buildings were damaged. There were 4 fatalities and 36 wounded. In Gaza City there were 40 airstrikes, with ground and sea shelling. 5 houses, a site of the Naval Police, the Gaza fishing harbor, a security compound, the 4th floor of al-Wafaa' Rehabilitation Hospital and a monument to the Marmara ship martyrs were destroyed. In the Central Gaza Strip, 37 airstrikes struck militant sites, a motorbike, a charity office, destroying 9 houses. In Khan Yunis, 31 airstrikes destroyed 12 houses. In Palestinian calculations there were 19 civilian dead and 37 wounded. At approximately 03:30, the Iron Dome counter-rocket defense system shot down a rocket over Haifa, the first time a rocket from Gaza reached that far. An elderly woman running for cover when hearing the sirens collapsed and was pronounced dead at the scene.

In the early morning, Hussein Izzat Atwe, a member of Al-Jamaa Al-Islamiya fired rockets at Israel, from the Hasbaya region of Lebanon. Only one projectile was reported to have hit Israel and caused little or no damage. When Lebanon investigated they found six additional rockets ready to be fired, including one which had exploded when fired. One man was later arrested in connection with the rocket fire after police found blood in his car which matched blood found at the scene of the rocket launchers.

Israeli troops fired 25 artillery shells into Lebanon at the outskirts of the village of Kfar Shuba.

In the early evening, Egypt seized rockets that were being smuggled from Gaza into Egypt; it was believed these were to be used to fire on Israel.

After three and a half days of the operation, Israel had struck 1,090 sites in Gaza, while 525 rockets had been fired from Gaza at Israel.

In the evening, two Israeli soldiers were injured by anti-aircraft missiles near Nahal Oz. By the end of that day, Israel had struck 235 targets in Gaza, resulting in 23 deaths. From Gaza 137 rockets were fired toward Israel, causing no deaths.

==== 12 July ====
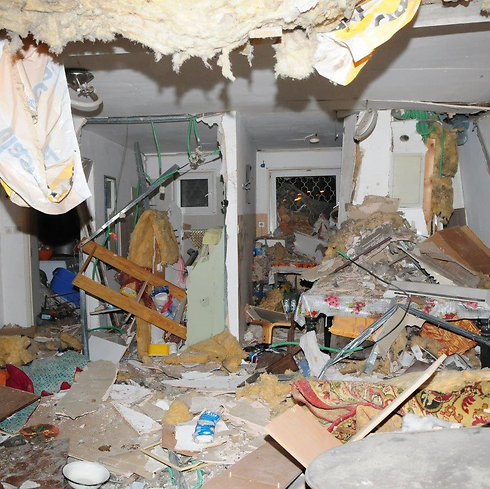
A house in Israel after a direct hit from a rocket in the fifth day of the operation, 12 July 2014

Overnight in the Northern Gaza Strip, 57 airstrikes, together with tank and gunboat fire, struck and shelled a variety of sites, destroying 10 houses and institutional offices, including a disability rehabilitation center. 77 people were wounded including 28 children and 21 women. In Gaza City, 43 airstrikes, combined with ground and sea shelling destroyed 11 houses, and hit security sites, and open land, with 11 killed and 30 wounded. In the Central Gaza Strip, 35 airstrikes demolished 9 houses, militant sites, open areas, and some charities and mosques. There were 6 fatalities and 41 wounded. In Khan Yunis, 39 airstrikes hit housing, demolishing 12 houses, open areas, a charity, and a bank. There were 9 fatalities. In Rafah 34 airstrikes targeted houses, destroying 8, and government offices and tunnels, and ground and sea artillery was all offices. There were 28 fatalities. An IDF strike targeting Gaza police chief Tayseer Al-Batsah's home killed 21 people and wounded 45. The police chief's Gaza City house was nearly destroyed by two rockets. Many of those killed were leaving a mosque, next door to the home, at the time of the strike.

Just before dawn, an IDF missile hit a center for disabled people in northern Gaza killing two of its residents and injuring five more. A mosque which the IDF said was being used as an armory was also hit.

Rockets were fired at Beersheba and Ashdod wounding ten people, one of them seriously. Ten rockets aimed at Tel Aviv were launched, for which Hamas claimed responsibility; no casualties were reported. At around 20:00 in the evening, Hamas convened a news conference and announced that at 21:00 they would fire J80 rockets into central Israel that would challenge the Iron Dome system. The Iron Dome system intercepted three of the rockets; the rest fell in open areas. there were no injuries and minor shrapnel damage. In response, the IDF launched a combined attack involving artillery, helicopters, and fighter jets on many targets throughout the Gaza Strip. Rockets were fired at Haifa, where an elderly woman died of a heart attack while trying to reach a bomb shelter.

Later in the evening, three rockets were fired from Gaza toward the Jewish settlement of Efrat, but all three landed in Palestinian neighborhoods; two in Bethlehem and one in Hebron.

Around 23:00, two rockets were fired from Lebanon into western Galilee, causing no casualties; the IDF responded with artillery fire. By day's end, Israel had struck 180 targets in Gaza, resulting in 51 deaths. From, Gaza 125 rockets were fired toward Israel, with no deaths.

==== 13 July ====
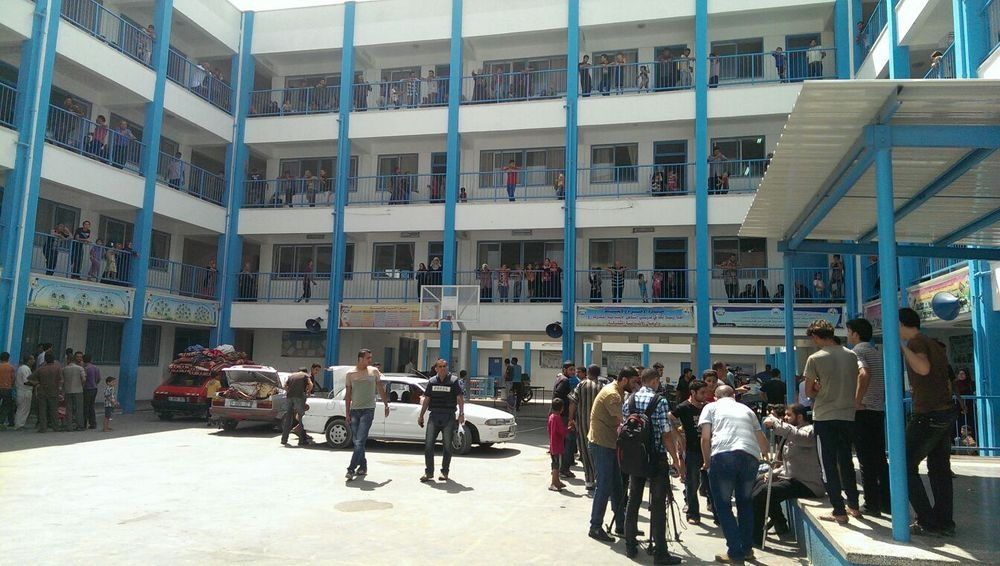
An elementary school in Gaza's Rimal neighborhood, where UNRWA is housing refugees who left their homes on orders from the Israeli military on the night between 12 and 13 July 2014

By the start of the sixth day, Israel had struck 1,320 sites within Gaza, resulting in 167 deaths and more than 1,000 injured. During the same time frame, more than 600 rockets have been launched at Israel from Gaza.

In the early hours of the morning, Israeli naval commandos landed in Gaza on the al-Sudaniya beach, on a mission to raid a compound from which long-range rockets were being fired. The Israeli commandos encountered Hamas fighters during the raid, and a gunfight ensured. Three Hamas fighters were killed and four of the commandos were lightly wounded. Israel stated that their mission was successful, and it took out several long-range rocket launchers.

At 6:00am, 670 people living in Gaza who had dual citizenship were given a chance to be escorted by the IDF out of Gaza to their respective embassies in Israel. A 30-minute window was given to people wishing to leave; many people missed this opportunity and remained in Gaza.

Later in the morning, Israel began dropping leaflets, making telephone calls, and sending texts warning Palestinians in northern Gaza to evacuate by noon. Schools in Gaza have been opened to shelter those who are evacuating their homes; which can shelter up to 35,000 people. Although Hamas discouraged people from following Israel's advice, it is believed that approximately 10,000 did, in fact, leave. After Israel began striking their targets in the north the number of people who left their home was reported at 17,000, totaling about 25% of the town's 70,000 residents.

In the morning, Palestinians fired four rockets at Gush Dan, the Shfela, and Ashdod. A boy was seriously injured in an Ashkelon rocket attack. In the afternoon, Hamas fired a heavy barrage of Fajr-5, M-75 and M-160 rockets to all parts of the country, including Ashkelon and Gush Dan. Iron Dome intercepted a rocket over Rishon Le-Zion, the Sharon plain and Haifa.

In the evening, a rocket fired from Gaza hit the infrastructure in Israel that provides electricity to 70,000 Palestinians in Gaza, cutting off their power. This was followed by a break from the rocket fire, which correlated with the World Cup. An Israel missile killed 9 youths and wounded 15 as they were watching the Argentine-Netherlands semi-final match in a beach café in Khan Younis,

By day's end, Israel had struck 173 targets in Gaza, resulting in 13 deaths. 130 rockets were fired from Gaza toward Israel, but there were no resulting fatalities.

==== 14 July ====
By the start of day seven of the operation, there had been 1,320 strikes by Israel in Gaza, and 940 rockets fired from Gaza at Israel.

Throughout the day, 115 rockets were fired from Gaza toward Israel, causing no fatalities. Israel struck 163 targets in Gaza, killing seven Hamas fighters and raising the overall death toll to 185. The IDF said that after the first seven days they believed 3,000 of the 9,000 rockets in Gaza had been destroyed. 1,050 rockets had been fired at Israel, leaving roughly 5,000 remaining rockets as of that time and date.

In the early afternoon, the IDF announced it had utilized a MIM-104 Patriot missile to down a drone, near Ashdod, which came from Gaza. Hamas later took responsibility for this drone, stating they had sent six into Israel, which successfully completed three missions over IDF military bases.

In the early evening, Hamas said it destroyed an IDF Merkava tank stationed near Gaza with a Kornet anti-tank missile; Israel confirmed that a missile had been fired at a tank, but said that the tank's Trophy Active Protection System destroyed the missile before it could cause any damage or injuries.

As day seven of the operation came to an end, news broke that a ceasefire negotiated by Egypt was close to being announced, effective 9:00am the following day. This would be followed by negotiations in Cairo on 10 July. Hamas acknowledged that negotiations were ongoing, however no agreements had been finalized.

=== Week 2 ===
==== 15 July ====
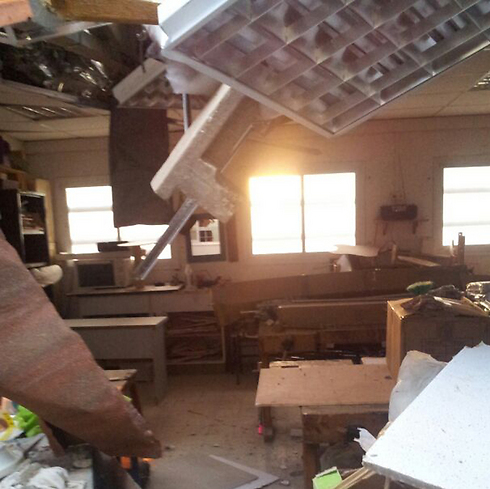
A school in Rishon LeZion damaged by Palestinian rocket on 15 July 2014

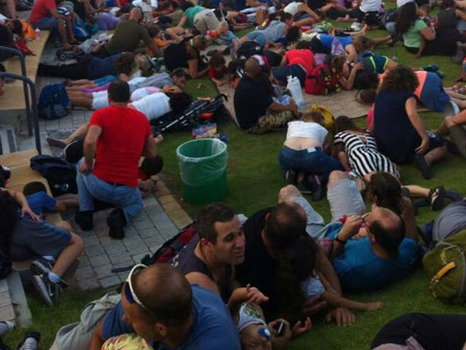
Israeli civilians lying on the ground in order to defend themselves from a rocket attack.

During the night, for the first time during the operation, two rockets were fired at Eilat, from Egypt.

At 07:00, Israel announced it had officially voted to accept the ceasefire proposed by Egypt for 09:00. Hamas rejected the ceasefire, claiming that it had not been consulted on it, and criticized it as an initiative of surrender rather than a truce, vowing that "our battle with the enemy will continue and will increase in ferocity and intensity." Ismail Haniyeh, the deputy head of the Hamas political bureau, stated that although Hamas was contacted about the ceasefire, they would not accept it unless Israel fulfilled the "demands of the Palestinian people", such as ending the blockade. Hamas fired 40 rockets into Israel within the first five hours of the proposed ceasefire timeframe.

At approximately 15:00, six hours after Israel announced it would accept the ceasefire, Netanyahu announced that, due to the continued rocket fire from Gaza, they would be renewing their strikes.

Netanyahu, on the evening of 15 July, fired Deputy Defense Minister Danny Danon. According to Netanyahu's associates, Danon lost his job for stating that Hamas had "humiliated" Israel.

In the evening, eight days into the operation, an Israeli civilian, Dror Hanin, a rabbi who was delivering food to Israeli soldiers, was killed in a mortar attack at the Erez crossing. He was the first Israeli directly killed in the war and the second Israeli death that was a result of it (the first being an elderly woman in Haifa who died of a heart attack while running to a bomb shelter).

On 15 July, Israel had struck 96 targets in Gaza, resulting in 16 deaths and 156 rockets had been fired toward Israel. In eight days Israel had struck 1,603 targets in Gaza, causing 194 deaths. From Gaza 1,147 rockets were launched toward Israel, causing one Israeli death.

==== 16 July ====
Around midnight, the start of day nine of fighting, Netanyahu vowed to intensify and expand Israeli strikes after accelerated rocket launches from Gaza during the six-hour Israeli cessation of hostilities.

During the night, Israeli warplanes bombed the house of senior Hamas leader Mahmoud al-Zahar. Israel also hit the homes of several Hamas leaders including Bassem Naim, Fathi Hammad and Ismail al-Ashqar, all four homes were reportedly empty at the time. Shortly after these attacks, it was announced the death toll within Gaza had surpassed 200 people. During the night, Israel sent pre-recorded messages to approximately 100,000 people in Gaza City to leave their homes by 8 am.

Magen David Adom in the evening reported that they offered to transfer donated blood to help those injured in Gaza; however the Palestinian Authority rejected the blood and rejected their offer to help run blood drives.

In the early afternoon, Hamas and the PIJ proposed a ten-year truce with Israel. The Palestinian terms for a truce included:

- IDF moving their tanks further into Israel from Gaza
- Re-release of all prisoners freed in exchange for Gilad Shalit and arrested during Operation Brother's Keeper
- Remove blockage from all borders with the Rafah crossings on UN control
- Establish an airport in Gaza under UN control
- Expand fishing zone to 13 km
- Israel borders with Gaza controlled by the UN
- Israel cannot intervene in the Palestinian unity government
- Israel must give Gaza residents permission to visit Jerusalem and pray in Al-Aqsa

Later in the afternoon, four Palestinian boys from the Fatah-aligned Bakr family, aged between 9 and 11, Ismail, Zachariah, Ahed and Mohammed Bakr, were killed on a Gaza beach by a shell fired by an Israeli naval gunboat as they were playing soccer. A later Israeli criminal investigation closed the case stating the site was a Hamas Naval Police and Naval Force compound, which was shelled when several figures were observed entering it "at a running pace" and "the figures were not identified at any point during the incident, as children." A 2015 IDF internal report, published in 2018 by The Intercept, concluded that the four were killed by missiles fired from a Hermes 450 surveillance drone hovering above the beach, after the go-ahead was given by an Israeli air force commander at the Palmachim air base, south of Tel Aviv. One boy was said to be mistaken for a Hamas militant was killed, and as the other 3 fled, the drone operators asked their supervisors how far they could pursue the other three along the beach. Since no reply was given, the other three were then taken out. No charges were laid for criminal negligence since, in the view of the reviewing committee, it was impossible with air surveillance to identify the four as children.

During the day, UNRWA discovered approximately 20 rockets hidden in a vacant school in the Gaza Strip. Israel claimed that the rockets were returned to Hamas. Christopher Gunness, the spokesperson of UNRWA, has denied this, saying that "According to longstanding UN practice in UN humanitarian operations worldwide, incidents involving unexploded ordnance that could endanger beneficiaries and staff are referred to the local authorities. Local authorities fall under the government of national consensus in Ramallah."

On 16 July Israel had struck 50 targets in Gaza, resulting in 17 deaths. From Gaza 94 rockets were fired toward Israel, resulting in no fatalities.

==== 17 July ====
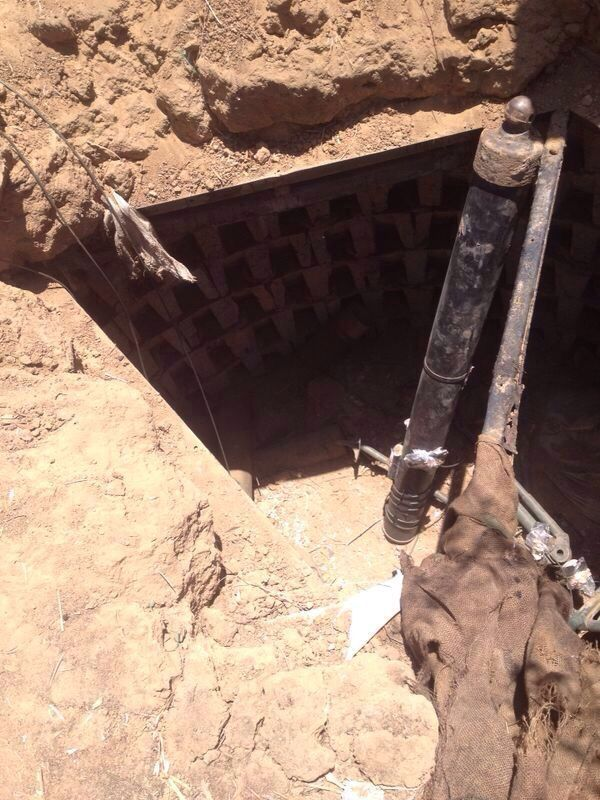
Tunnel used to infiltrate Israel, 17 July

During the night, Israel agreed to a five-hour humanitarian ceasefire, proposed by the UN, followed shortly by Hamas' acceptance. The ceasefire took place from 10:00 to 15:00, local time.

Approximately five and a half hours prior to the ceasefire's effect, 13 armed Hamas fighters emerged from a tunnel on the Israeli side of the Gaza border near kibbutz Sufa. The IDF detected the infiltrators, who went back to the tunnel shaft to escape back to Gaza after realizing they had been spotted. The IDF hit the tunnel shaft with an airstrike, killing five of the infiltrators. No Israeli casualties were sustained in this incident. Israeli Army Radio reported the men were carrying weapons and abduction-related equipment, including tranquilizers and handcuffs. Subsequent searches of the tunnel uncovered ammunition, grenades, grenade-launchers, and military-grade vests.

Approximately two hours into the ceasefire, three rockets were fired from Gaza into Israel. Israel attributed them to Hamas, although responsibility for them was not claimed. At exactly 15:00, at the end of the agreed upon five-hour ceasefire, sirens began ringing again in Israel, in the Ashkelon region.

In the early evening, for the second time since the operation began, the IDF shot down a drone launched from Gaza into Israel, using an MIM-104 Patriot missile. Hamas later acknowledged having launched the drone.

At the beginning of the night, IDF artillery batteries fired hundreds of shells into the northern Gaza strip after warning civilians to leave the area. Hamas ordered civilians not to leave, and some were still present when the attack started. IDF ground forces then entered Gaza. The Egyptian government stated that it held Hamas responsible for the hostilities leading to Israel's ground operations, as Hamas had been offered but rejected a ceasefire. Israeli Prime Minister Benjamin Netanyahu said that the ground invasion's task was to disable the tunnels near the border used by Hamas to invade Israel.

Shortly after Israeli ground forces entered Gaza, Israeli tanks began shelling Wafa Hospital in Gaza. Israel said it had given the hospital multiple advance warnings to evacuate their 17 patients before attacking a weapons storage facility at the hospital.

==== 18 July ====
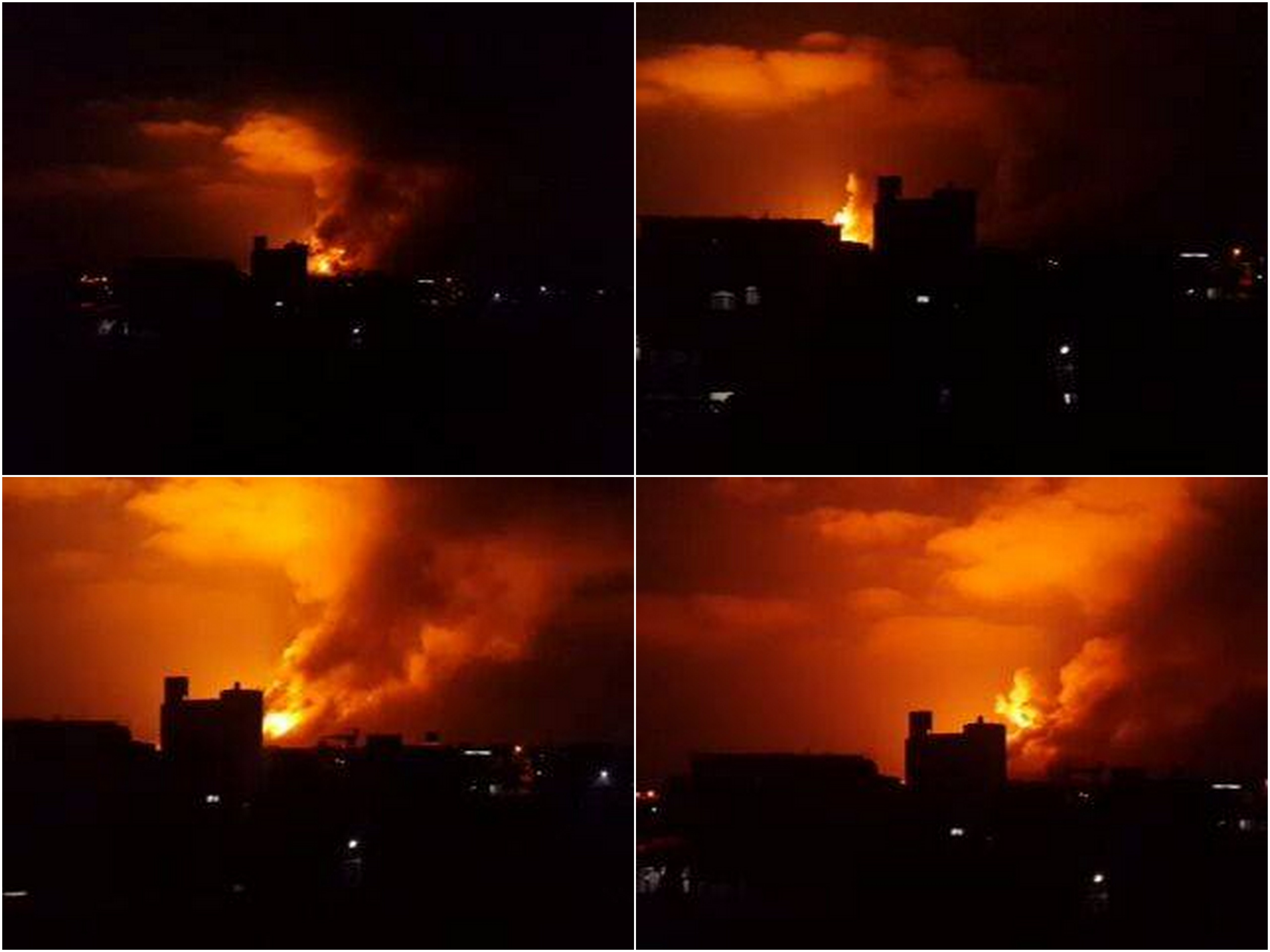
Operation Protective Edge, east of Gaza City, 18 July

Shortly after midnight, the IDF announced approval to call up 18,000 additional reserves, bringing the total reserves IDF allowed to call to 72,000. Overnight the IDF destroyed the home of PIJ leader Abdullah al-Shami.

The IDF announced that 20 Hamas fighters were killed and 13 captured in the opening hours of the ground offensive. One Israeli soldier was killed during an operation against rocket launchers in Beit Hanoun on the early morning of July 18 after IDF troops came under fire, in an incident in which five other Israeli soldiers were injured. It was later established that he was killed by friendly fire.

In the early afternoon, Israel announced that paratroopers had found eight tunnels and later announced that thirteen more tunnels had been discovered.

The IDF announced that it had hit 260 targets in Gaza and uncovered 21 tunnels so far. Hamas military commander Ali Jandiya was killed in an Israeli airstrike on his home in Shuja'iyya. Three militants were killed by Israeli tank shelling on the building they were positioned in after firing an anti-tank missile at an Israeli tank. A search of the building uncovered a stockpile of weapons that included anti-tank missiles. Separately, Israeli commandos of the Maglan unit destroyed a Hamas position with a precision missile, and an armored force hit a militant squad preparing to fire an anti-tank missile. The IDF announced that a militant had been killed by Israeli troops after requesting medical assistance, only to attempt a grenade attack. An Israeli commando force of the Sayeret Rimon unit also ran into and killed a militant riding a motorcycle while combing a tunnel opening.

==== 19 July ====
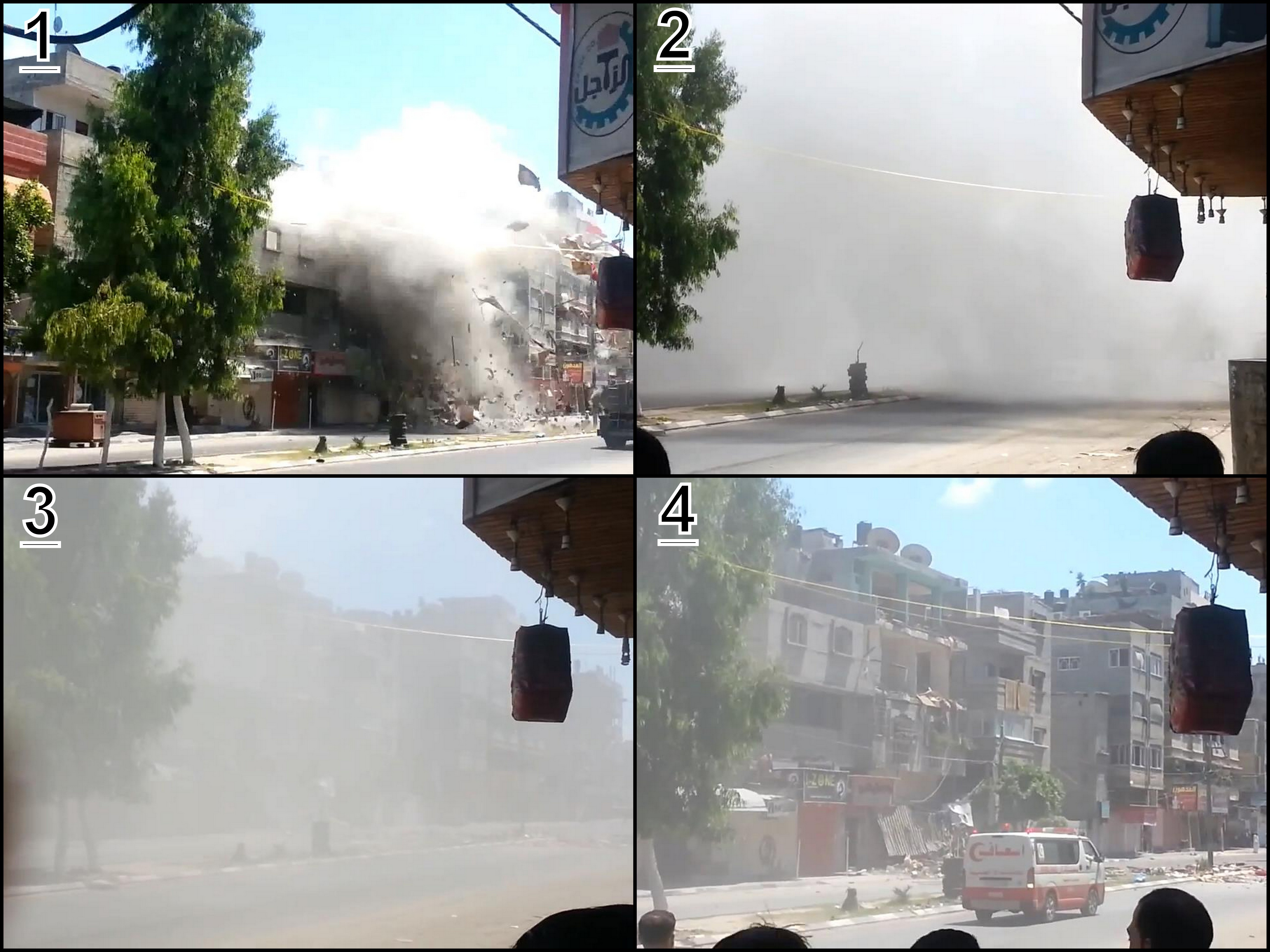
Airstrike of a house in Gaza, 19 July

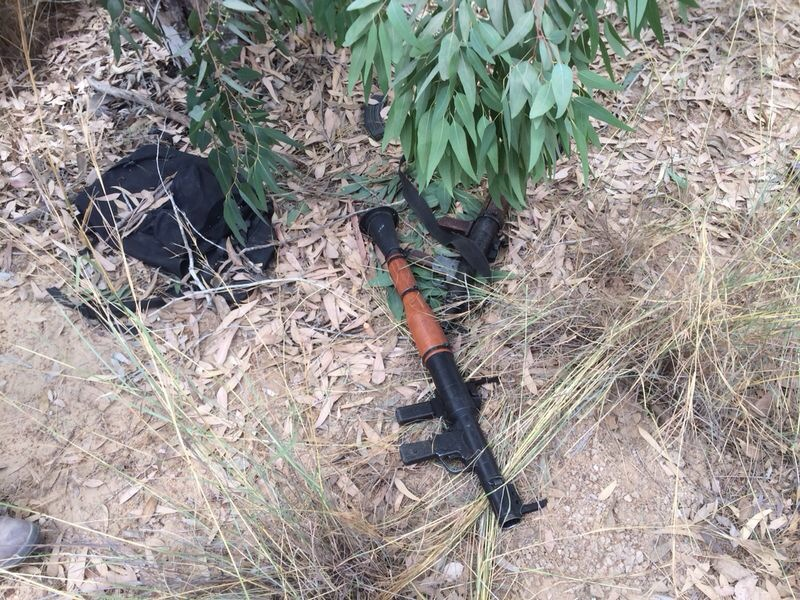
Equipment left behind by Hamas operatives who infiltrated Israel through a tunnel and engaged IDF troops

Shortly after midnight, the IDF said that more than 40 militants had been killed since the start of the ground operation, and an additional 21 militants had been captured.

In the late morning, nine Hamas militants entered Israel via a tunnel, wearing IDF uniforms and carrying weapons, handcuffs, syringes, and sedatives. They were met by IDF troops. One militant and two IDF soldiers were killed in the resulting exchange of fire. The remaining militants escaped through the tunnel, and several of them were later killed in Gaza by an Israeli airstrike. Hamas claimed to have killed five IDF soldiers in the attack.

During the day, an anti-tank missile was fired at an IDF position in Gaza, killing a soldier. In the evening, a Hamas fighter emerged from a tunnel in southern Gaza and opened fire at an Israeli unit, killing a soldier and wounding another. The soldiers returned fire, killing the attacker.

In the afternoon, a rocket fired from Gaza at Israel landed on a tent of an Israeli Bedouin family, killing a man, critically injuring a 4-month-old, and injuring two others. By that night the IDF had uncovered 34 tunnels within Gaza, and was dismantling them.

On 19 July, over 94 rockets were fired from Gaza at Israel. That day the IDF hit 140 sites in Gaza, bringing the total to 260 since the ground operation started, causing 49 deaths and bringing the total number of Palestinian deaths during the operation to 348.

In the evening, the Battle of Shuja'iyya began. The IDF launched a preemptive bombardment of the Shuja'iyya neighborhood of Gaza City, prior to a ground incursion. According to the IDF, at least 15 Palestinian militants were killed in the preemptive bombardment. An IDF force spearheaded by the Golani Brigade then entered Shuja'iyya. Late on 19 July, forward elements of the Golani Brigade met Hamas units and fierce combat broke out, with Hamas fighters emerging from tunnels and bunkers to engage the Israelis, employing sniper fire, automatic weapons, and anti-tank missiles, pinning down some Israeli formations.

==== 20 July ====
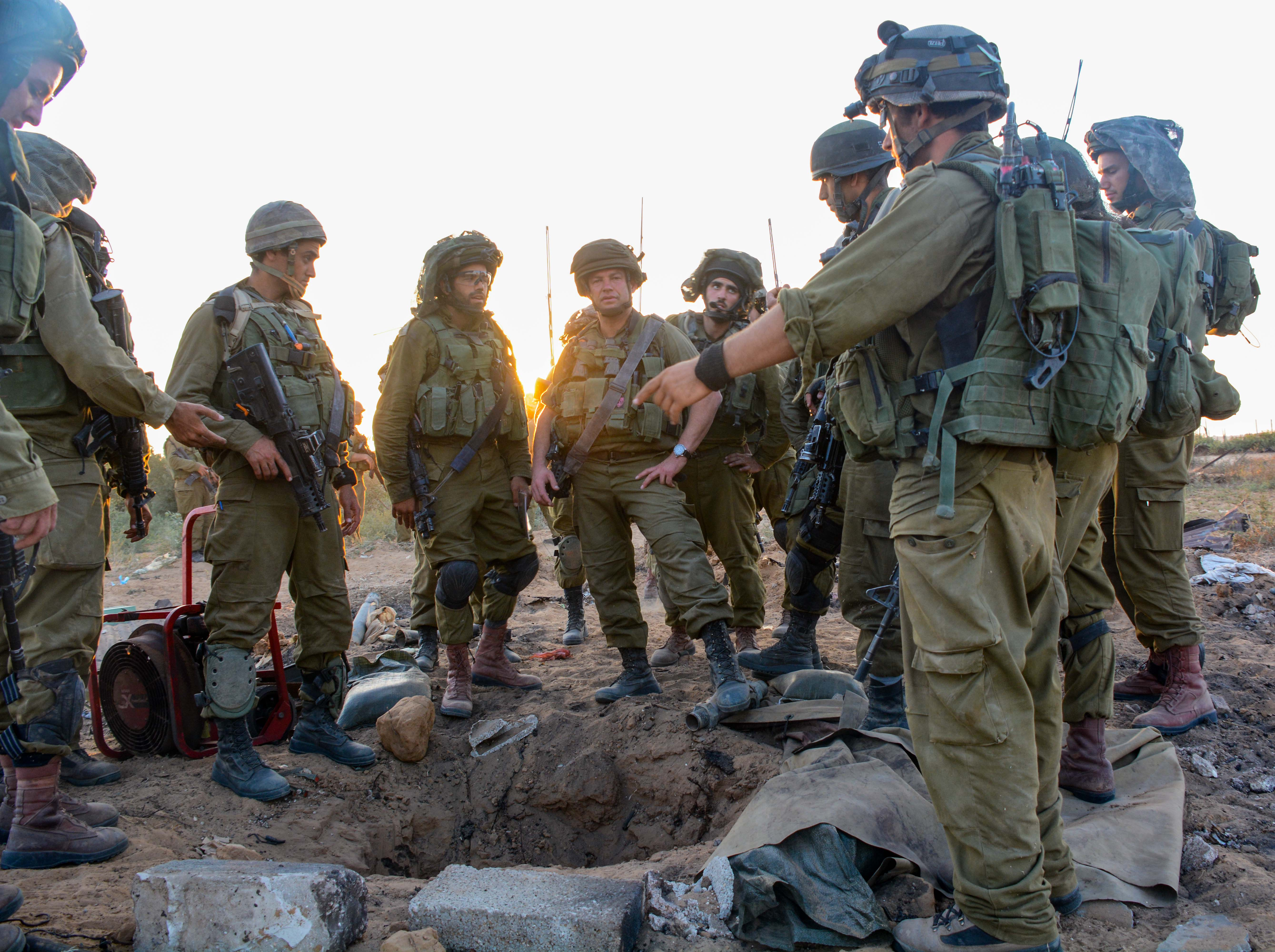
Israeli paratroopers operate within Gaza.

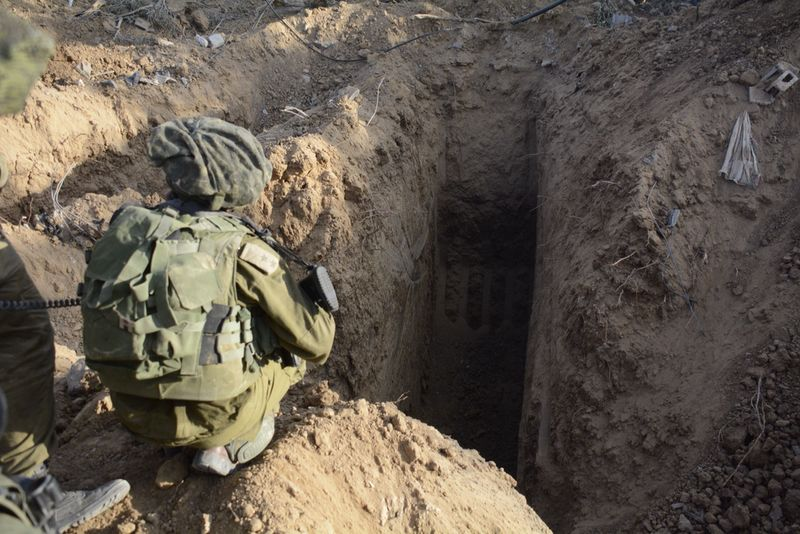
An Israeli soldier overlooks an uncovered Hamas tunnel

The Battle of Shuja'iyya, which had begun the previous day, continued as Israeli troops and Hamas fighters continued to battle in Shuja'iyya. On the morning of 20 July, seven Israeli soldiers were killed when an Israeli M113 armored personnel carrier was hit by an anti-tank missile. Hamas fighters managed to seize the body of Staff Sergeant Oron Shaul, one of the soldiers killed in the attack on the armored personnel carrier. IDF engineering forces later reached the wreck of the APC and towed it back to Israel. In the following hours, three more Israeli soldiers were killed in clashes with Hamas fighters, and three others were killed when an anti-tank missile hit a building where soldiers were setting up a command center. The IDF brought in D9 armored bulldozers to destroy enemy positions. In one case, a few Hamas fighters were killed when an IDF bulldozer destroyed a tunnel they were in. After particularly heavy fire was laid down on Israeli forces in Shuja'iyya, the IDF launched a massive artillery barrage and series of airstrikes after ordering the infantry into armored personnel carriers, with artillery fire landing within 100 meters of Israeli forces. According to the IDF, 37 Hamas fighters were killed in the bombardment, and all firing ceased afterward.

In total, at least 72 and up to 120 Palestinians, including civilians, were killed in the battle, in what local medical authorities, along with Palestinian Authority President Mahmoud Abbas, called a massacre. The IDF stated that Shuja'iyya had been the site of 8% of the rocket launches since 8 July, and that residents had been warned to leave two days earlier.

Hamas requested via the Red Crescent a humanitarian ceasefire for the Shuja'iyya neighborhood to allow the evacuation of wounded from the area. The IDF agreed, and the ceasefire began at 13:30; however, only an hour into the truce, IDF troops came under fire and responded.

In total, the IDF confirmed that 13 IDF soldiers were killed during the fighting in Shuja'iyya. Another 56 soldiers were wounded and scores were hospitalized, including the commander of the Golani Brigade, Colonel Ghassan Alian. The IDF claimed that more than 100 Palestinian militants were killed in Gaza during the night. In one airstrike aimed at a Hamas member, 25 members of one family were killed along with the target. During the overnight fighting, the IDF uncovered ten more tunnel systems.

The military wing of Hamas claimed to have killed at least 32 Israeli soldiers since 19 July. Hamas also claimed captured an Israeli soldier named Shaul Aron. However, Ron Prosor, the Israeli ambassador to the United Nations, denied the report. Israel confirmed that Staff Sergeant Oron Shaul was missing, but eventually declared him dead.

==== 21 July ====
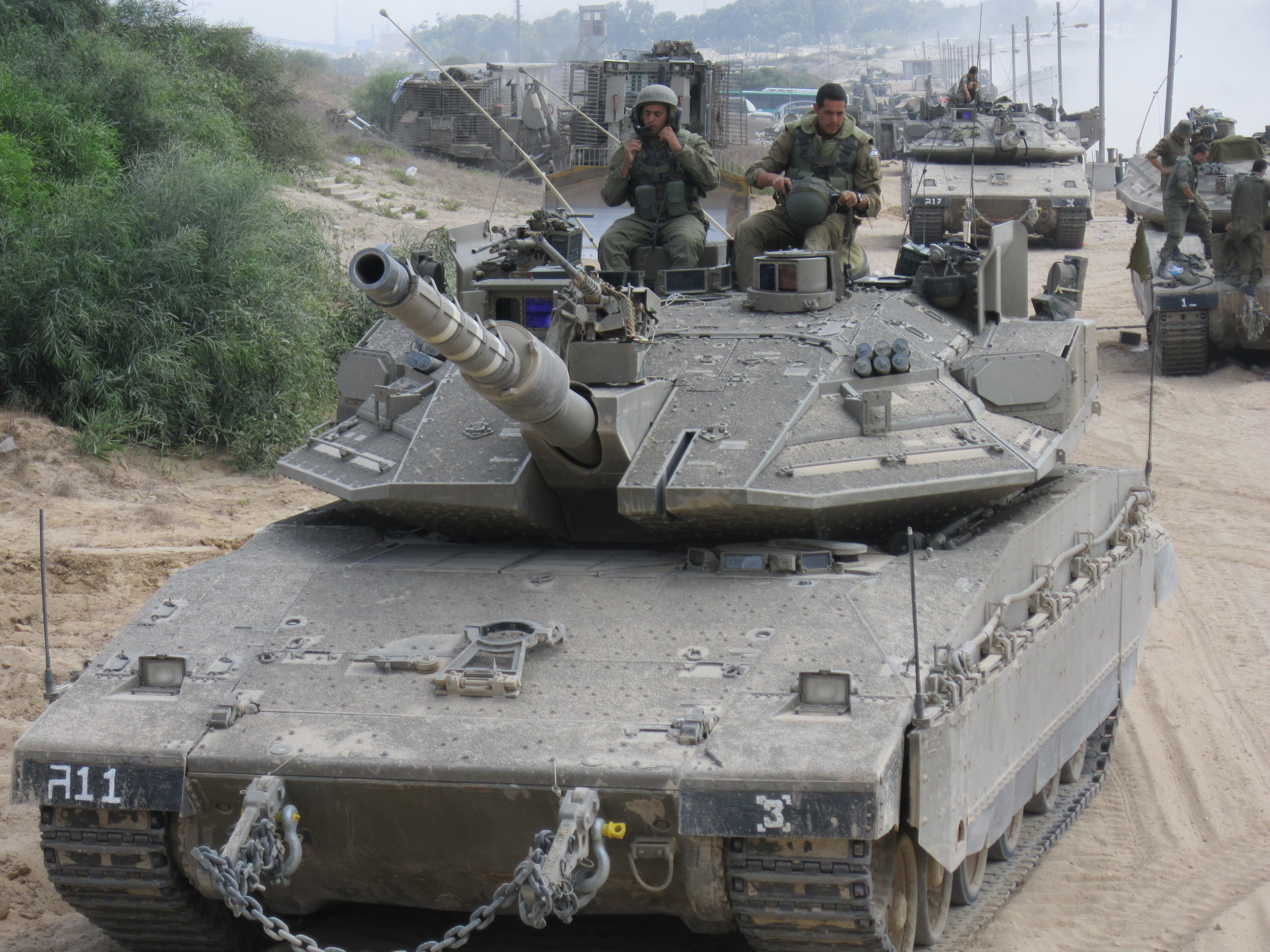
An Israeli armored column including Merkava 4m tanks and IDF Caterpillar D9 armored bulldozers of the 401st Armored Brigade operating near the Israel-Gaza border

Since the beginning of the operation, IDF has struck some 2,800 targets in Gaza, while 1,497 rockets have been fired from Gaza at Israel.

During the night, two cells of Palestinian militants attempted to infiltrate Israel using tunnels. While the Israeli Air Force directly hit the first cell, ground troops engaged the second. At least ten militants were killed in the two incidents. During one attack, 10 Palestinians exited the tunnel wearing full IDF uniforms. Four IDF soldiers were killed in the attack when an anti-tank missile hit their jeep. Another three Israeli soldiers were killed in heavy fighting in Shuja'iyya, during which the Israeli Air Force dropped 120 one-ton bombs on the neighborhood, striking within 250 meters of ground troops. Israeli commandos of the Egoz Unit killed 10 Palestinian militants in Shuja'iyya, including one who was carrying an explosive belt. The commander of the Egoz Unit was seriously wounded in the fighting. Two other Israeli soldiers were killed in fighting elsewhere in Gaza. An Israeli officer commanding a paratrooper unit in the Khan Yunis area was fatally shot by a sniper, and would die of his injuries in January 2017.

An Israeli airstrike in Gaza City killed Islamic Jihad commander Sha'ban Suleiman al-Dahdouh, a commander in the Islamic Jihad's battalion in Zeitoun.

Reports from Gaza in the afternoon stated that the IDF shelled a hospital, killing five and injuring many others. The IDF commented on the situation stating that their target was a stock of anti-tank missiles which was stored in the immediate vicinity of the hospital.

At the Erez Border Crossing, the IDF set up a field hospital for injured Palestinians from Gaza.

A 21 July CNN report stated that more than 83,000 Palestinians have sought refuge in U.N. facilities with more than 2,000 rockets fired at Israel since the start of the Operation, the latter information from the IDF. That day as well, President of the United States Barack Obama called for a return to the Gaza-Israel cease-fire agreement while also expressing regret at the civilian casualties both in Israel and in Palestine.

=== Week 3 ===
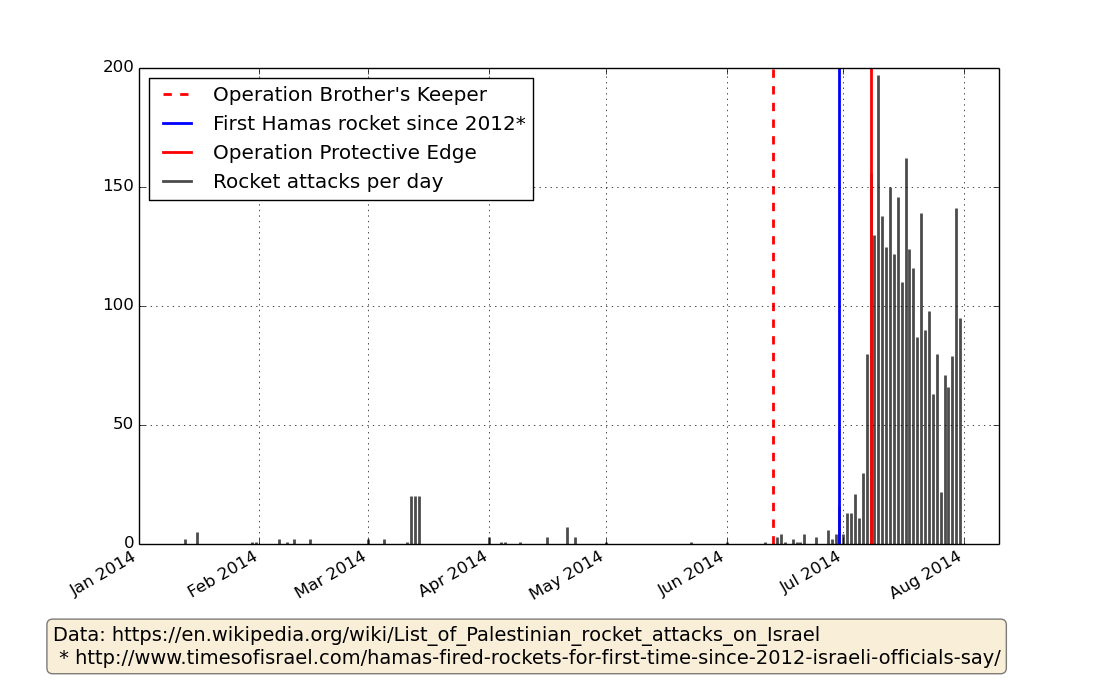
Histogram of Palestinian rocket attacks on Israel per day, 2014

==== 22 July ====
Shortly after midnight, the United Arab Emirates announced it would be giving $41 million in aid to Gazans and the U.S. government announced $47 million in aid.

A night raid by an Israeli force of the Nahal Brigade killed eight Palestinian fighters. In the morning, a battle took place between an Israeli paratrooper unit and Hamas fighters in which 15 Hamas operatives and an Israeli soldier were killed. Two Israeli tank officers were also killed in fighting in Gaza. A tank company commander was killed by a Hamas sniper in Shuja'iyya, and a tank platoon commander was killed by enemy fire during combat in Beit Hanoun. Senior Hamas operative Muhammad Majed Abu Kamil was killed in an Israeli airstrike in Juhor ad-Dik. Another Hamas member was killed in an airstrike on his home in the Khan Yunis area.

In the late morning, Al Jazeera stated their office was currently under attack by the IDF. IDF denied this, but could not rule out indirect damage from nearby targets.

In the afternoon, the IDF released additional information about the infiltrators from Gaza the day before. Details included the announcement that at least three were children, including a 13- and 14-year-old who were both wearing suicide vests.

In the evening, the EU released a statement condemning the firing of rockets from Gaza at Israeli civilians, the use of human shields, and called for the disarming of Hamas, the PIJ and all other militant groups in Gaza. The EU added that although Israel has the right to defend itself, they were appalled at the loss of human life in Gaza and asked Israel to try harder to limit civilian casualties.

Late in the evening, the UNRWA announced that for the second time in a week, during a routine inspection, rockets were found in one of their schools.

==== 23 July ====
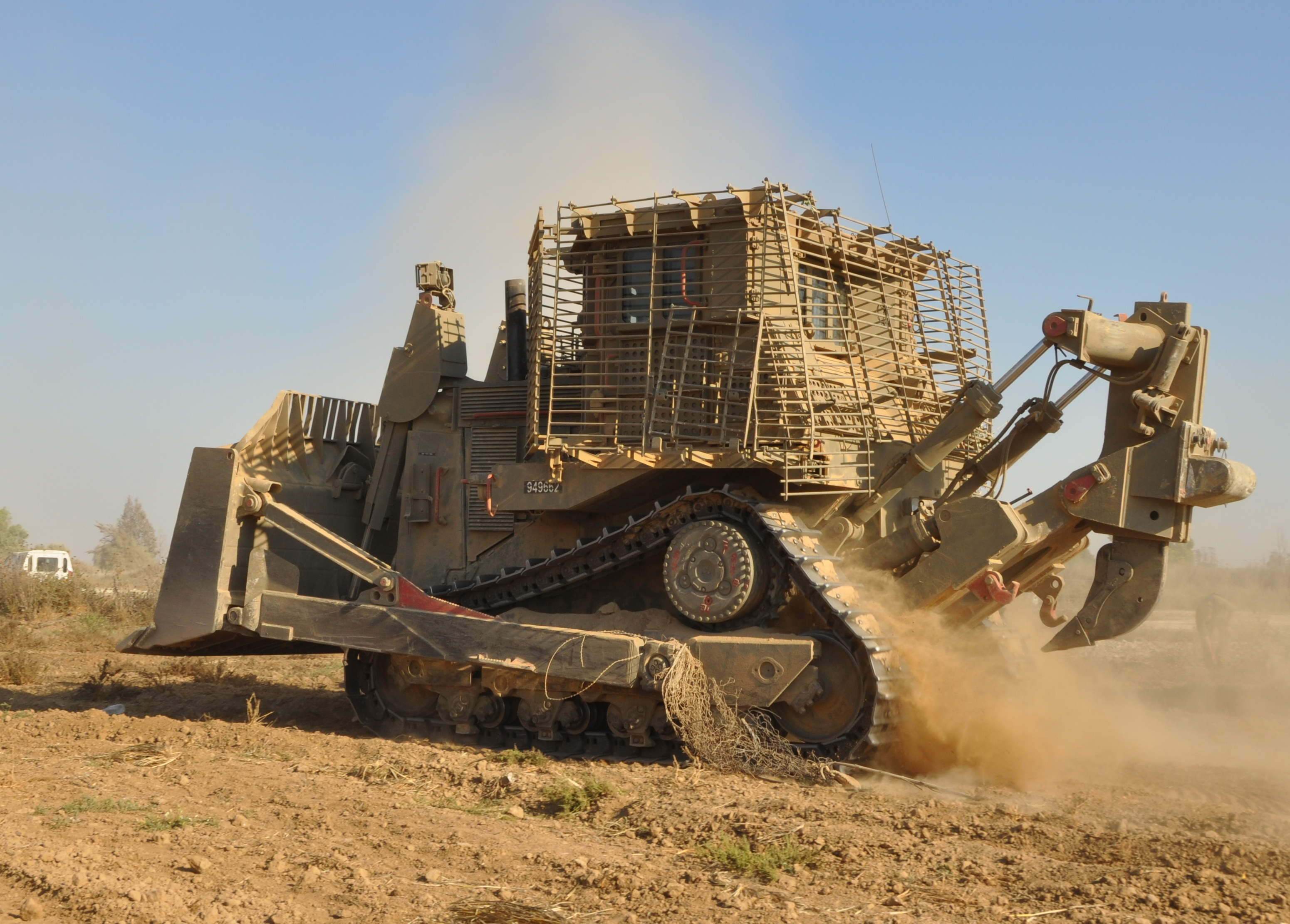
An Israeli D9 armored bulldozer operating on the Israel-Gaza border

During the night, a number of reports began circulating that the IDF was shelling the Al-Wafa hospital. The IDF later commented that, on several occasions, they were under direct fire from the hospital, a violation of international law; they also stated that they had been warning the hospital for several days to move the patients. A doctor from the hospital, Dr. Basman Alashi, confirmed that the hospital had been evacuated prior to the strike. The IDF released a video showing firing from the hospital, IDF's warning calls and finally the airstrike which triggered secondary explosions from weapons cached inside the hospital.

In the early morning, Hamas claimed to have shot down an F-16 over Gaza; however, Israel neither confirmed nor denied this claim.

In the afternoon, the IDF announced that it had recently discovered a new tunnel in Gaza in which IDF uniforms, maps, and weapons were found. In total, the IDF had uncovered 28 tunnel systems and over 60 tunnel openings since the beginning of the operation.

The IDF assassinated Mahmoud Awad Ali Ziadeh, a senior Islamic Jihad commander, in an attack on his home in the Jabaliya Camp. Ziadeh had served as a battalion commander in Islamic Jihad's northern Gaza Strip brigade.

A force of IDF paratroopers was attacked after entering a booby trapped house in Khan Yunis. Hamas operatives detonated the explosives that the house was rigged with, collapsing portions of the building, and opening fire. Three soldiers were killed, and a fourth was fatally wounded and died of his injuries on 31 August.

==== 24 July ====
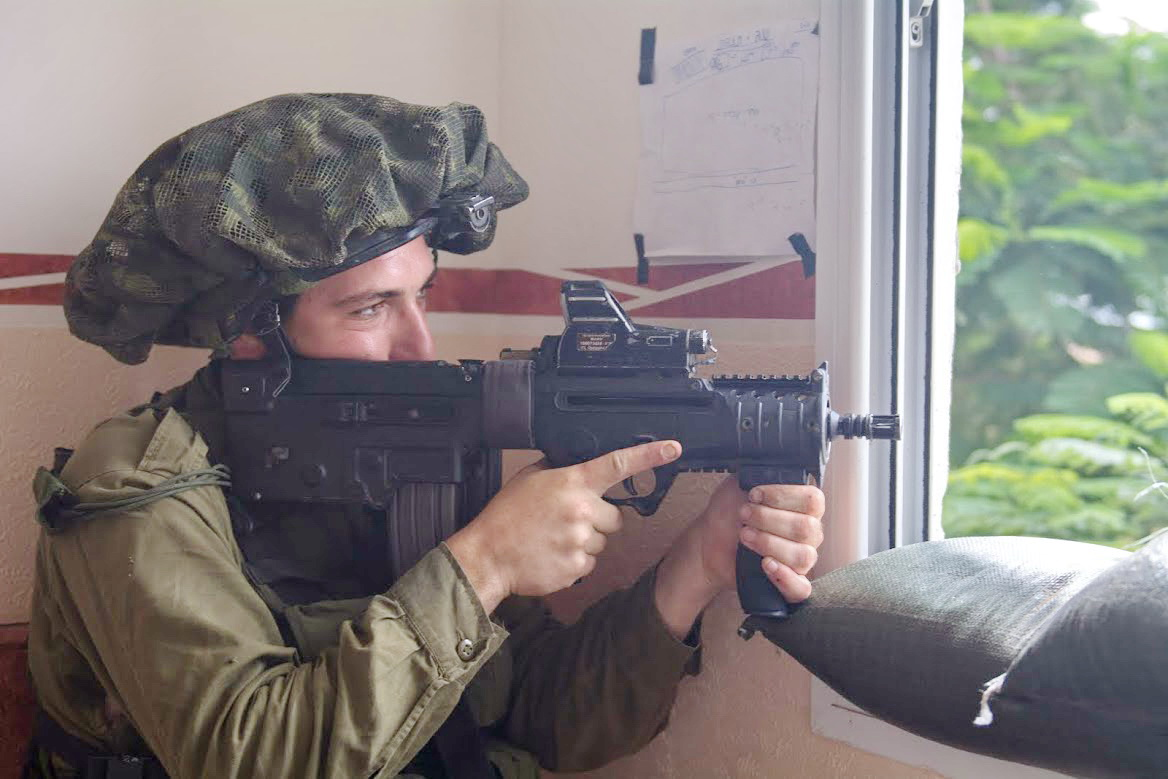
Israeli soldier armed with Tavor X95 in Gaza

During the night, 150 Palestinian militants, mostly Hamas operatives, were taken prisoner in raids in Khan Yunis and Rafah. Of them, 70 who were suspected of involvement in terror attacks were transferred to military intelligence and Shin Bet facilities for interrogation, while the remainder were later released. The IDF announced that it had killed 15 militants within the past 24 hours.

An UNRWA school in Beit Hanoun, being used as a shelter, was struck resulting in 11 being killed, including 7 children and two women, and UN staff, and some 110 civilians, including 55 children and 31 women, were wounded. While Israel has not admitted responsibility for the attack, a senior Israel military officer has admitted that the school shelling could have been caused by Israeli forces, Additionally several other Gaza rockets have landed in Beit Hanoun and the IDF has not ruled out one of these rockets landing on the school. Gaza authorities however said that the school was shelled by Israeli forces. Both the UN and Fatah stated that they were investigating the incident and was unaware of who struck the school. The school was used as a shelter, and about 800 people were inside at the time it was hit.

In the morning, Palestinian militants fired an anti-tank missile at IDF troops from Wafa Hospital. The IDF returned fire and killed two militants. A militant waiting in ambush was killed by IDF Paratroopers. During the night, an Israeli unit was engaged by Hamas fighters, and an Israeli infantry officer was fatally wounded in the firefight. He died of his injuries two days later. A grenade explosion outside of combat wounded five Israeli soldiers, one of whom also died of his injuries two days later.

During the evening, over 10,000 Palestinians in the West Bank protested the current operation at the Qalandia border crossing, resulting in at least 2 Palestinian deaths after Al-Aqsa Brigades members opened fire on Israeli forces. This protest was the largest since the second intifada. Following these protests and several riots over the past few weeks, Hamas called for more, including a third intifada.

==== 25 July ====
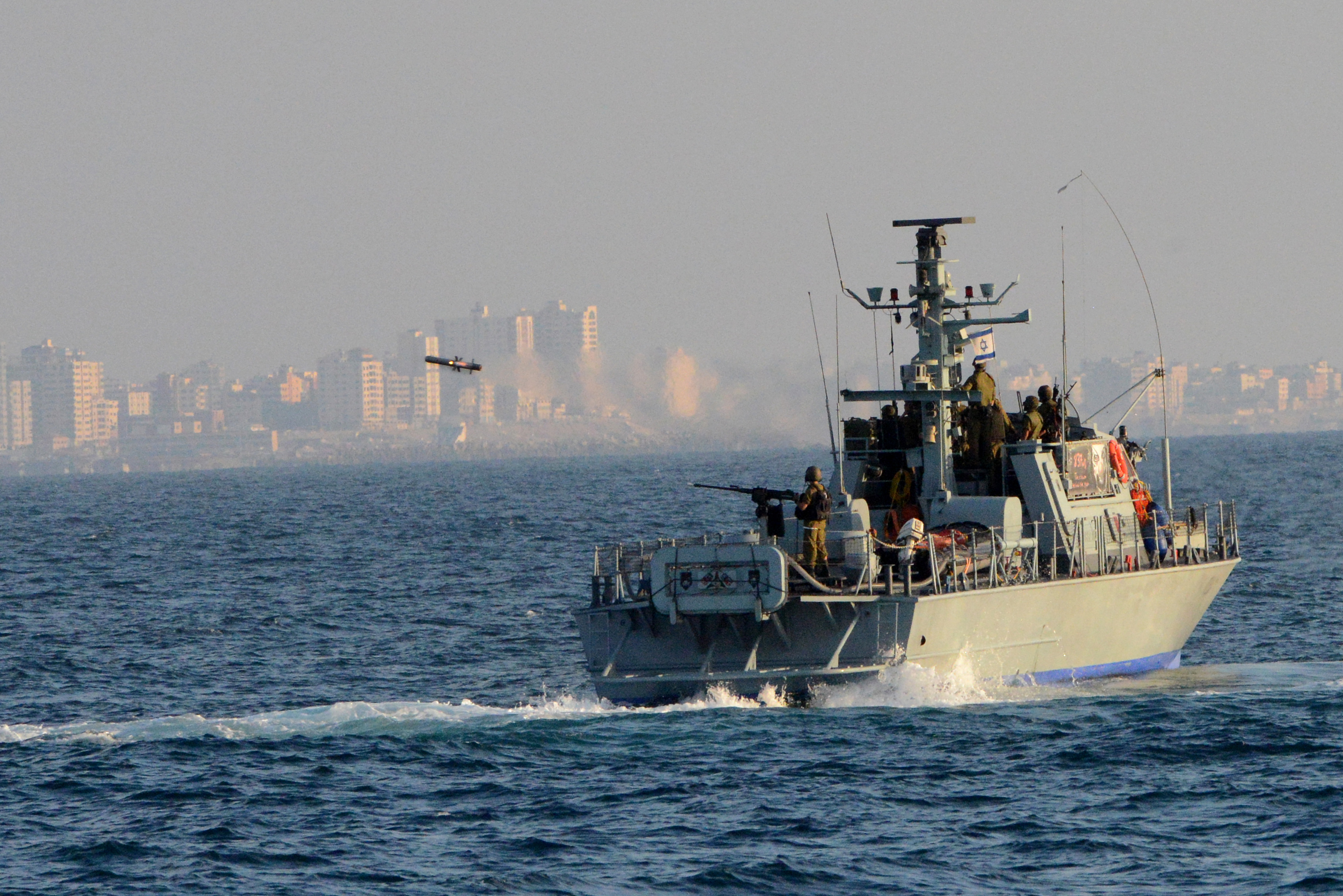
An Israeli Navy patrol boat firing at targets in Gaza

Palestinian officials have called for 25 July to be a "Day of Rage" in the West Bank and within Israel. In preparation of the expected protests and riots, the IDF and police have been stationed in critical points across Israel. It was reported that 3,000–4,000 police officers would be stationed around Jerusalem.

The IDF confirmed that three soldiers were killed during fighting in Gaza. One of them was killed in the course of a failed abduction attempt during which a Palestinian militant was also killed. Two soldiers from the Nahal Brigade were wounded in battle and seven others were injured by a bomb when they entered a booby trapped house. During the night, the IDF announced that a division commander was injured when a wall collapsed in one of the tunnels. The IDF claimed that six Hamas fighters were killed by Israeli paratroopers. The Israeli Air Force, acting on intelligence from Shin Bet, assassinated Islamic Jihad operative Salah Abu Hassanein, a member of the military council of the Al-Quds Brigades and head of Islamic Jihad's information department. His two children were also killed in the attack.

Overall, the Gazan death toll rose to 867. Rockets were fired at central Israel, and communities near the Gaza border continued to come under fire. One rocket was intercepted by an Iron Dome system. One person in Israel was moderately injured by a rocket.

Hamas claimed to have killed at least 10 Israeli soldiers in fighting in Gaza on July 25.

In the afternoon of 25 July, both Israel and Hamas stated that they were reviewing John Kerry's proposal, which would call for an immediate ceasefire followed by meetings in Cairo. Discussions would consist of:
Palestinian Demands

- Opening the Gaza and Israeli border crossings,
- Opening the Egypt and Gaza Rafah border crossing,
- Release Shalit prisoner exchange Palestinians rearrested during Operation Brother's Keeper,
- Release prisoners from the collapsed Israeli–Palestinian peace talks,
- Widen the Palestinian fishing barrier, and
- Establish both an airport and a seaport in Gaza

Israel announced in the evening that they had rejected the ceasefire, and would not accept any ceasefire that does not include destroying the Hamas tunnels. Israel, however, stated they would agree to a 12-hour humanitarian ceasefire in good faith.

Also on 25 July, anonymous sources within the Shin Bet claimed that the war had prevented 'a catastrophic event on an apocalyptic magnitude such as the Yom Kippur war', citing evidence said to have been uncovered of a planned September attack during Rosh Hashanah, in which 200 militants would have simultaneously infiltrated Israel through dozens of tunnels beneath Gaza, thousands of Hamas militants dressed in IDF fatigues would have swarmed over Israel to seize kibbutzim and murder or abduct as many Israeli citizens as possible. However, IDF Army Radio later quoted an unnamed "senior military official" as saying "all the tunnels were aimed at military targets and not at the Gaza-vicinity communities". In April 2015 intelligence sources stated that Mohammad Deif had planned such an operation, whose execution had been cancelled by the Hamas political leadership. Attempts by the Qassam Brigades nonetheless to conduct the operation during the war then failed, according to IDF assessments, because of the presence of large numbers of Israeli troops within the Strip.

==== 26 July ====
An Israeli unit operating in Beit Hanoun, Battalion 931 of the Nahal Brigade, encountered a force of Hamas fighters and engaged them in a 17-minute battle, killing 15 Hamas fighters while losing 2 dead and 10 wounded. Another Nahal Brigade soldier was killed when an anti-tank missile struck his position in Gaza, and an Israeli Engineering Corps soldier was killed in a mortar attack on an IDF assembly zone in Israel near the Gaza border. The IDF announced that Ismail Muhammad Saad Akluk, a senior Hamas member who had been involved in Hamas' weapons development and research programs, particularly in rocket and drone production, was killed when the Israeli Air Force bombed his vehicle, acting on intelligence provided by Shin Bet.

Both Israel and Hamas agreed to a 12-hour humanitarian ceasefire from 08:00 to 20:00. Although they stated that no shots would be fired, the IDF announced that they would continue to demolish tunnels during the ceasefire. The IDF stated that by the end of the ceasefire, only 9 rockets had been shot at Israel so far on 26 July, all before the ceasefire started.

Just prior to the expiration of the 12 hour ceasefire, Israel agreed to another four-hour extension of the ceasefire. Hamas, however, rejected the extension, and began firing rockets into Israel again, though Israel did not retaliate.

The Palestinian death toll rose above 1,000 as 150 bodies were found during the ceasefire. Additionally, the IDF death toll reached 42 after 2 soldiers who were previously injured died from their wounds. It was also determined that the Oron Shaul had been killed in action, though his body remained missing and was presumably in the hands of Hamas.

==== 27 July ====
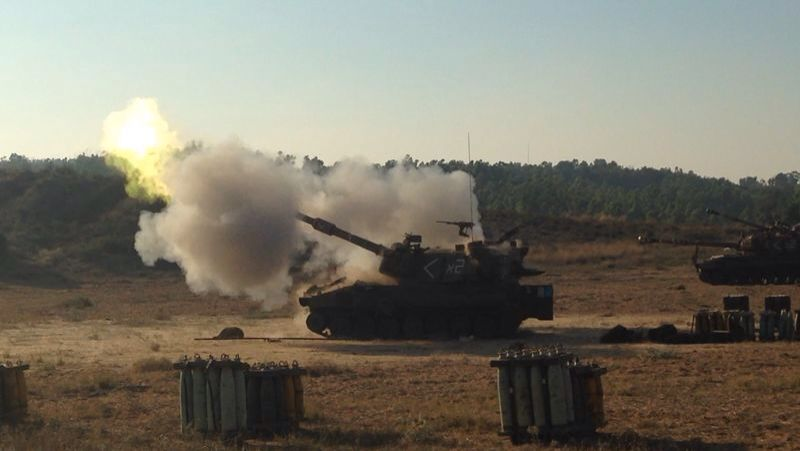
Israeli artillery shells targets in Gaza

The four-hour ceasefire extension ended at midnight, and, despite the continued rocket fire from Gaza, Israel agreed to an additional ceasefire throughout all of 27 July; however, Hamas rejected it. Hamas stated that they would not agree to any ceasefire that does not include a pullout of IDF troops.

Several hours after Israel respected UN's call to continue the humanitarian ceasefire, Hamas began firing a heavy barrage of rockets which was intercepted by the Iron Dome; in response, the IDF resumed attacks on military targets in Gaza. Later, Hamas requested another 24-hour ceasefire via the UN, but continued firing and took responsibility for the attacks.

As Israel continued the demolition of tunnels between Gaza and Israel, Egypt announced that they had destroyed 13 tunnels connecting Gaza to Egypt, bringing the total number of tunnels destroyed on the Egyptian border to 1,639.

Israel's Health Ministry offered humanitarian aid which included medical equipment and blood donations worth millions of shekels to the Gaza Strip, but the Palestinian Authority refused to accept it.

The IDF later announced that they had concluded their investigation into the UNRWA deaths. They stated that one mortar bomb had landed in a courtyard of the school but caused no injuries, and that the damage that caused the casualties was not caused by the IDF. The UN stated that they will be conducting their own investigation as well.

That afternoon, Israel announced for the second time in three weeks that a car bombing had been thwarted. The car contained electrically connected gas canisters, a pipe bomb, and a switch.

In the evening, Barack Obama called Netanyahu and reaffirmed his support for Israel's right to defend itself against rockets and tunnels, but expressed concern about the civilian death toll in Gaza. Obama called for a disarmed and demilitarized Gaza in any ceasefire proposal.

==== 28 July ====
Despite the unified Palestinian government, Fatah spoke out during the night against Hamas and their recent arrests of Fatah members within Gaza.

At 07:00, the United Nations Security Council held an emergency meeting to issue a statement calling for both sides to have an immediate and indefinite humanitarian ceasefire. The statement did not mention Hamas or Israel; instead, it only referenced the conflict in Gaza and requested that Egypt mediate a permanent ceasefire.

In the afternoon, there were reports of an explosion at the Al-Shifa Hospital that resulted in dozens of injuries. Initial reports from Gaza stated the Israeli F-16 planes fired missiles at the hospital, but Israel stated that they believed the explosion was caused when militants attempted to fire a Fajr-5 rocket at Tel Aviv and it malfunctioned and exploded. Hamas stated that neither they nor the PIJ had anything to do with the explosion.

In the evening, several Hamas members infiltrated Israel through a tunnel and attacked an IDF base near Nahal Oz. According to the IDF, five soldiers and at least one of the infiltrators were killed, and the rest of the infiltrators escaped. The infiltrators attempted unsuccessfully to take an IDF soldier's body back with them. Hamas claimed that the infiltrators killed 10 IDF soldiers and all returned safely.

In a separate incident, four IDF soldiers of the 7th Armored Brigade were killed by Hamas mortar fire toward Israel's Eshkol region. Shortly afterward, the IDF warned via text messages and phone calls the residents of Jabalia, Zeitoun and Shejaiya to evacuate their homes. Soon after the warnings, Zeitoun and Jabalia came under fire by the IDF. The IDF later extended the evacuation warnings to Beit Hanoun and Beit Lahiya.

In Gaza, an Israeli soldier was killed when an anti-tank rocket hit the D9 armored bulldozer he was driving. The militant squad that fired the RPG then withdrew into a nearby building that was then demolished by an IDF bulldozer, killing eight militants. Two others were found alive and taken prisoner by Givati Brigade troops.

Hamas said that its fighters managed to kill 19 Israeli soldiers on Monday alone in three separate attacks. "Ten were killed in a behind-enemy-lines operation in eastern Gaza City, six killed in mortar attack on Israeli troops in eastern Khan Younis, and two in clashes in northern Gaza Strip," the group said.

Israel criticized John Kerry's proposed ceasefire, stating that it favors Hamas and its continuity. Furthermore, Israel informed other nations that no ceasefire deal will be accepted without the destruction of the tunnels leading from Gaza to Israel and the demilitarization of the Gaza Strip.

=== Week 4 ===
==== 29 July ====
Shortly after midnight, France announced that it had agreed to transfer 8 million Euros to Gaza in aid. In Israel, Guy Meroz reported that Israeli supermarket magnate Rami Levy was providing food to the families of Israeli soldiers who were killed in action.

Overnight, over 100 were killed in Gaza. Israel targeted 70 locations within Gaza, including the home of a senior political leader of Hamas, Ismail Haniyeh. Additionally, Israeli forces targeted the building containing Hamas' media offices for Al-Aqsa TV and radio. The PIJ announced that Ahmed Najam Abu Hamda, the commander of its forces in Rafah, was one of 32 killed by Israel overnight. Fuel tanks located outside the only Gazan power plant were also struck overnight, causing massive blackouts across Gaza.

In Rafah, Israeli Givati Brigade troops of the Sayeret Rimon commando unit who were serving as lookouts for other Israeli troops on an anti-tunnel mission were attacked by a squad of five Hamas fighters while positioned in a building. All five of the militants were killed. Four were killed by a single Israeli soldier who ignored his commander's order to take cover and returned fire, and the fifth was killed by another soldier after running to a nearby mosque.

In the early evening, a squad of five Hamas fighters infiltrated into Israel from a tunnel in the southern Gaza Strip. IDF Givati Brigade troops identified them as they emerged from the tunnel and killed all five without sustaining any casualties. A subsequent search of the tunnel shaft from which they had emerged uncovered numerous weapons. The militants were carrying a large amount of explosives and weapons for what the IDF believed was for a suicide mission.

In the early morning, it was announced that Egypt agreed to have Hamas and PIJ representatives be part of the Palestinian delegation set to meet on 29 July in Cairo. In the afternoon, the PLO said that a 3-day unilateral ceasefire would be announced shortly. Hamas however rejected the ceasefire. Later in the evening, it was again announced that all sides had agreed to a ceasefire, though no official word was given.

Waddah Abu Amer, a political leader of the Democratic Front for the Liberation of Palestine (DFLP), his wife, and five children were killed when the army fired a missile into their home in Khan Younis.

As of 29 July, 200,000 of Gaza's 1.6 million residents were seeking shelter in UNRWA schools. Additionally 1,190 Palestinians have been killed through 22 days of the conflict.

==== 30 July ====
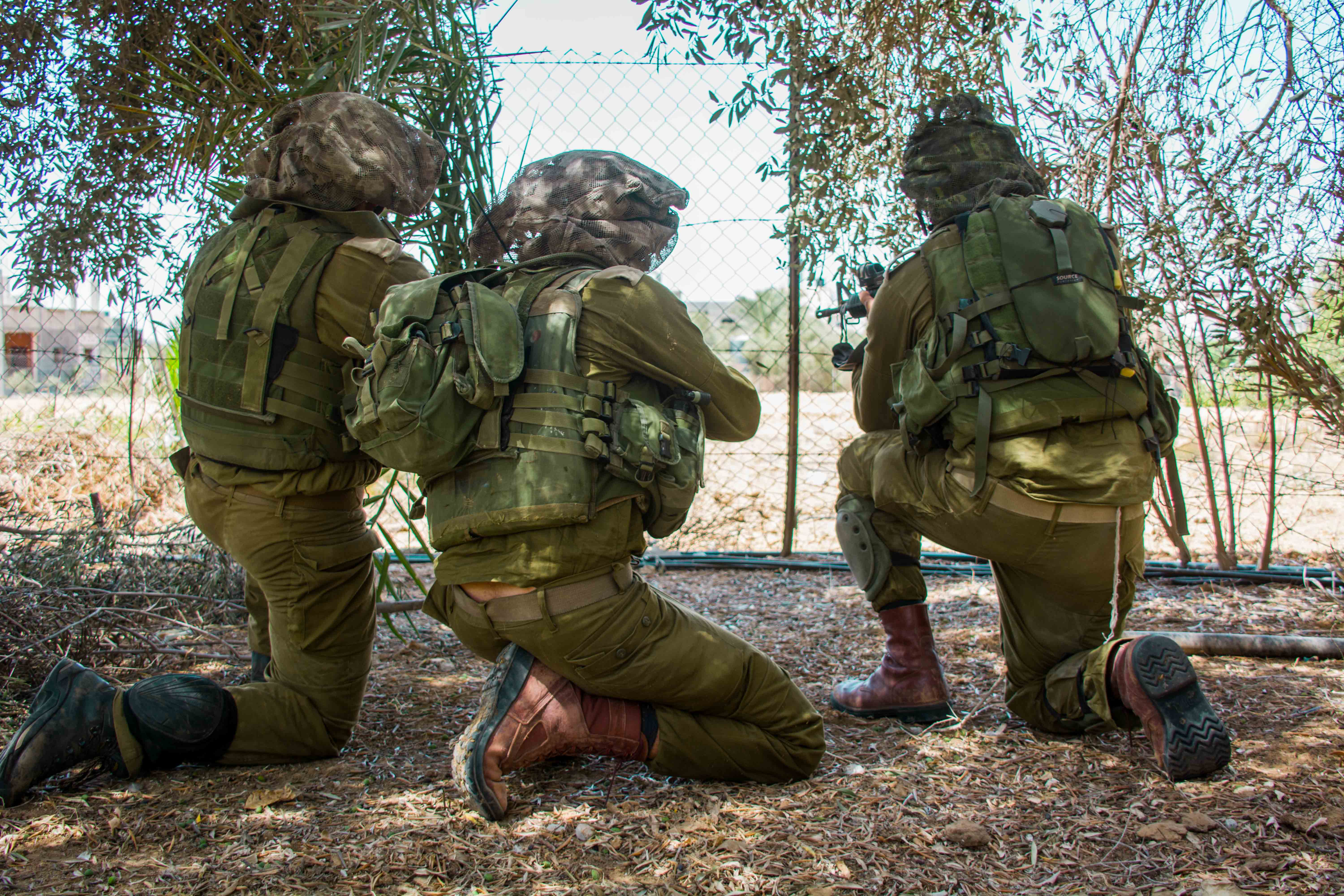
Israeli paratroopers operating in Gaza

During the night, the PIJ stated that no Palestinian group had been formally invited to Egypt to discuss a ceasefire.

A UNRWA school was once again hit overnight resulting in 19 Palestinian deaths. Israel admitted that one of their rockets hit the school when they were returning fire after being shot at from the vicinity of the school.

Israel agreed to a four-hour humanitarian ceasefire from 15:00 to 19:00, however stated that it did not apply to areas they were currently operating in, and residents were requested to not return home. Hamas rejected the ceasefire, calling it a media stunt by Israel.

The IDF announced that nine militants were killed in clashes with IDF troops throughout the day. Three IDF soldiers from the Maglan commando unit were killed and fifteen wounded after entering an explosives-rigged building near Khan Yunis that was subsequently blown up on top of them. The building, which was allegedly a UNRWA health clinic, had an entry shaft to a tunnel the soldiers were sent in to eliminate. IDF soldiers evacuating the casualties were fired on by Palestinian militants. UNRWA later announced that this building was not their property and they did not have a health center at this location. Hamas claimed that at least 15 Israeli soldiers were killed in this attack.

==== 31 July ====
The US announced that they agreed to transfer a number of arms to Israel, including rocket launchers, mortar rounds, grenades and other arms. For many years, the US has stored weapons in Israel for their use, under the War Reserves Stock Allies-Israel program, however they have agreed to transfer these to Israel for their use.

In the early morning the IDF the call-up of an additional 18,000 reservists, bring the total to 84,000.

Five Israeli soldiers of the 188th Armored Brigade were killed in a mortar attack on their position in Israel's Eshkol Regional Council, near the border with Gaza. Three other soldiers were wounded by sniper fire in Gaza. There were a number of clashes between the IDF and militants in Gaza during which 15 Palestinian militants were killed, including one where Golani Brigade troops killed an armed Palestinian emerging from a tunnel and another where a paratrooper squad identified about five militants and called in an airstrike which killed them. According to Magen David Adom, 26 people were injured by rocket fire, most of them suffering from shock. A man was seriously injured in Kiryat Gat by shrapnel after a rocket was intercepted over the city, and two soldiers were injured by rocket fire in Sderot.

The Palestinian Authority announced that it plans to sue Israel in the International Criminal Court for war crimes. The PA chose to join the ICC and sue Israel despite the risk of knowing it can be sued back by Israel.

Israel and Hamas agreed to a 72-hour humanitarian cease-fire set to begin on 1 August at 08:00. The United States Secretary of State, John Kerry, stated "this is a respite. It is a moment of opportunity, not an end." Furthermore, Netanyahu, stated that Israel will continue to destroy Hamas' tunnel network with or without a ceasefire. Delegates from Israel, the US, the UN, and other parties agreed to meet in Cairo to discuss terms during the ceasefire. Egypt was to stand in as the mediator for the indirect talks as both the United States and Israel refused to negotiate directly with Hamas due to its designation as a terrorist organization.

The cease-fire comes after the death toll in Gaza rose to at least 1,441, surpassing the casualties of the Gaza War that occurred in late 2008 through early 2009.

==== 1 August ====
Hours before the 72-hour ceasefire was announced, US Secretary of State John Kerry announced that "... Israel will be able to continue its defensive operations that are behind its lines, and Palestinians will be able to receive food, medicine and additional humanitarian assistance."

Overnight 29 July–August 1, Israel and Hamas agreed to a 3-day ceasefire, to come into force at 08:00hrs. Forces were to remain in place. Israel declared it would continue search and destroy operations on tunnels within its lines: Hamas agreed not to fire over the border, but said it would not tolerate continued operations against their tunnels during the period.

Hamas fighters emerged from a tunnel in Rafah and attacked an Israeli reconnaissance unit of the Givati Brigade. A suicide bomber exploded among the soldiers while gunmen exchanged fire with them. Three Israeli soldiers were killed, including the reconnaissance unit's commander and his radio operator. Hamas fighters managed to seize the body of one of the soldiers, Second Lieutenant Hadar Goldin, before escaping. A Hamas fighter wearing an Israeli uniform was also reportedly killed in the clash. According to the IDF, the unit was attacked 90 minutes after the ceasefire came into effect. Israel adopted the Hannibal Protocol. Colonel Ofer Winter, the commander of the Givati Brigade, on the night the ceasefire was brokered, ordered a search and destroy operation for a suspected tunnel or related infrastructure 2 km northwest of Israel's border, in an area Israel had earlier searched and then withdrawn from. At the time of the brokered ceasefire it lay beyond Israel's lines. The orders foresaw making "a big boom before the ceasefire" came into effect. At 07:30 am, Hamas's military wing tweeted that battles were taking place in east Rafah, causing casualties for the IDF. Palestinian casualties started arriving at the al-Najjar hospital by 08:00 am, and Hamas declared it had captured a Lieutenant Hadar Goldin. After 08:00 Palestinians, hearing of the ceasefire, began to return to their homes in the area. No warning was given to Rafah residents: for three hours, massive firepower was trained on the area. The IDF fired around 800 artillery shells and 260 mortar shells, while combat planes bombed about 20 targets and combat helicopters bombed another 14. By day's end, the munitions expended had reached 2,000. Bulldozers flattened houses in which people were hiding. Cars in which Palestinians tried to flee were shot at. Survivors described jets, drones, helicopters and artillery raining fire at pedestrians and vehicles, including ambulances either returning for the ceasefire or fleeing the renewed onslaught. According to Palestinian sources, about 130 Palestinians were killed and hundreds wounded. An IDF investigation concluded that 42 Palestinian militants and 72 civilians were killed in the bombardment. Throughout the day, Israel kept up fire on the al-Najjar hospital and its vicinity, causing further casualties, and it had to be evacuated when the fire became too intense, at 15:30 pm.

The White House Press Secretary, Josh Earnest called the capture of the IDF soldier a barbaric violation of the ceasefire. The US Deputy National Security Advisor, Tony Blinken also commented calling the capture outrageous and demanding the immediate return of the soldier. John Kerry called the incident outrageous and called for the immediate and unconditional release of the soldier. Ban Ki-moon stated that he placed full blame for the truce violations on Hamas and ordered the immediate release of Goldin. Canada's Foreign Affairs Minister John Baird called the capture and breaking of the ceasefire "disgraceful and repugnant" and stated that Hamas has lost all credibility. Turkey Foreign Minister Ahmet Davutoglu stated that although a ceasefire is the number one priority they are willing to help Israel in any way they can find Goldin.

At around 10:00 at least 15 Hamas rockets were fired from Gaza, seven reportedly intercepted by Iron Dome. Otherwise, Hamas did not engaged in any further combat clashes with the Israeli forces that day in Rafah. By day's end, at least 2,201 houses were destroyed or damaged.

==== 2 August ====
At around 02:30 A.M. Hamas military wing, Qassam Brigades, denied holding Hadar Goldin. It also acknowledged that it had lost contact soon after the firefight with group that was thought to have clashed with Goldin and the other soldiers. It presumed that Goldin and the militant squad which had taken him were all killed by Israeli airstrikes and artillery fire. That morning Israeli forensic investigators concluded Goldin had died the day before. Israel continued through to 3 August to lay waste greenhouses, homes, fields and orchards, turning the outskirts of Rafah into a wasteland.

According to officials within the Gaza Health Ministry, intense bombardment in the area where Goldin was thought to have been abducted caused at least 112 Palestinian casualties.

==== 3 August ====
As morning unfolded on the 27th day of the conflict, Israel targeted Gaza as air raids and tank shelling resumed in the southern and central part of Gaza. At around 09:30–10:00 The Al-Zafer 9 tower, and many other buildings in central Gaza was subject to heavy Israeli fire.

Al-Aqsa TV initially reports that at around 11:00 a UN school in Rafah is under Israeli fire. Various reports, including reports from the Palestinian health ministry have reported that at least seven people were killed in the attack and more than 30 injured. Latest reports suggest that "...an explosion just outside the school gates.", were witnessed at around 10:30 Further reports suggest that "... It was not immediately clear whether the strike was the result of Israeli or Palestinian fire." Israel released a statement, stating Israeli military surveillance video showed that the IDF had targeted three militants who were near the school on a motorcycle. The IDF is still investigating the incident further. The death toll in Gaza topped 1,800.

The IDF announced that it believed 2nd Lt. Hadar Goldin to have been killed in action, after Israel employed its "Hannibal Directive," which dictates that Israel bombard the area where the soldier was taken captive, even at the risk of the soldier, in order to ensure that he is not taken captive into enemy territory. The IDF continued to make significant progress in destroying dozens of cross border tunnels discovered during the operation, however Prime Minister Benjamin Netanyahu declared that Israel's operation in Gaza to restore security would continue, and made it clear that Israel would not negotiate ceasefires with Hamas due to the latest breaches in the ceasefire. The Israeli government maintained the position that Israel would withdraw its forces only once it had deemed security to have been restored.

Ahmad al-Mabhouh, a Hamas commander who was an engineering and sabotage expert in a Hamas unit in the Jabaliya refugee camp, was killed in an Israeli airstrike based on intelligence provided by Shin Bet. Mabhouh, who was a nephew of Hamas commander Mahmoud al-Mabhouh, had participated in rocket attacks on Israel and the preparation of complex explosive charges to be used by Hamas. Four other militants were killed when the building they were positioned in was shelled by the IDF and collapsed. Givati Brigade soldiers discovered and seized quantities of weapons and munitions, and discovered the entrance to a tunnel. Three militants were spotted emerging from the tunnel, and fled under heavy IDF shelling to a nearby home. All three were killed when the home was shelled. The tunnel was subsequently destroyed. Palestinian militants fired at least 119 rockets at Israel throughout the day, eight of which were shot down by the Iron Dome.

The IDF began redeploying ground forces, including the removal of many of their forces, however Israel Cabinet Minister, Amir Peretz, clarified, saying, "It's not a withdrawal. It's setting up a new line that is a more controlled line with the air force doing its work."

==== 4 August ====
Israel declared a seven-hour humanitarian ceasefire, except for Rafah, starting from 10:00–17:00 to allow aid for civilians. A few hours before the ceasefire was due to start, an Israeli airstrike killed senior Islamic Jihad commander Danial Mansour in northern Gaza, and rocket fire from Gaza continued to hit Israel. The IDF stated that this incident occurred just prior to 10:00. According to news reporters, just 6 minutes after the beginning the ceasefire, an ASM missile was fired at a three-story house in the Shati refugee camp, killing a Palestinian eight-year-old girl.

In the early afternoon, a man named Mohammad Jabbis, in downtown Jerusalem, driving an industrial digger, hit a pedestrian, bus, and car; before the driver was shot and killed by police. The victim, a 25-year-old male, died after resuscitation attempts failed. The bus was empty at the time of the incident minimizing the casualties. Israel later announced that the tractor driver's cousin's house was destroyed by the IDF two weeks ago, and this is believed to be a revenge attack.

At approximately 16:00 an IDF soldier was shot in the stomach just outside Mount Scopus at Hebrew University. After the soldier was shot, the shooter jumped on his motorcycle heading toward the Arab village of Wadi al-Joz.

In the late evening it was announced that once again both Hamas and Israel has agreed to a 72-hour ceasefire. Netanyahu has previously stated he wouldn't explore a ceasefire until the tunnels were all destroyed, which was finishing earlier on 4 August.

== Timeline, weeks 5–8 ==
=== Week 5 ===
==== 5 August ====
Shortly after midnight, hours before the ceasefire, Obama signed The Iron Dome Bill providing $225 million in additional funding for the Iron Dome.

In the early afternoon a security guard was stabbed at the entrance to Ma'ale Adumim. The security guard then opened fire on the stabber who was able to flee on foot toward Kfar Azaria.

As day 29 ended, both sides had held their fire, and were engaged in negotiations for a long-term truce through Egyptian mediation in Cairo.

==== 6 August ====
After 30 hours of silence in southern Israel, false alarm sirens rang out along the Gaza border.

In the evening Egypt proposed an extension of the cease fire from Friday morning until Sunday morning. Israel later announced that they accepted the extension. Hamas later responded by saying there was no agreement to extend the ceasefire and would renew fire if their demands were not met.

==== 7 August ====
As permanent ceasefire talk progressed, the main separation point held with Hamas demanding the lifting of the blockade, while Israel demanded Hamas demilitarization. Israel agreed that it will terminate the blockade and expand the Gaza fishing zone, on the condition that all the groups in Gaza demilitarize.

In the evening it was announced that the body of Ayman Taha, a Hamas official, was found in Shuja'iyya ruins. It is believed that he was executed for spying for Egypt. Additionally Hamas admitted that a number of collaborators with Israel had been executed.

An armed Palestinian man on a bus, who was in the country illegally, was arrested in Beit Shemesh.

==== 8 August ====
Amid the stalemate regarding the negotiations in Cairo, hours before the end of the 72-hour cease-fire, Israel announced fire from southern Gaza into Israel resumed, however Hamas denied it. At 04:02, rocket sirens sounded in southern Israel, and at 04:35, mortar rounds landed in southern Israel as well. No injuries were reported.

At 08:00, at the end of the ceasefire, rockets from Gaza were fired at Ashkelon, with one rocket downed by the Iron Dome. Within the first few hours after the ceasefire's end, over 35 rockets were fired from Gaza at Israel, resulting in two injuries.

After several hours of rocket fire, Netanyahu ordered Israel to respond and resume targeted strikes in Gaza. Israel announced that their troops were still positioned along the Gaza border and were prepared for any necessary action.

The Israeli delegation left Cairo, stating they would not negotiate any long term ceasefire while under fire.

The IDF stated that since resuming fighting, over 57 rockets were fired from Gaza, and the IDF struck 51 targets in Gaza.

==== 9 August ====
Senior Hamas official Moaaz Zaid was killed when an airstrike hit a mosque in Gaza. Two other Hamas operatives were killed in an airstrike on the motorcycle they were riding in the Maghazi refugee camp. The IDF claimed to have attacked 60 targets and killed nine militants in targeted killings. Two Hamas operatives were killed in fighting with the IDF in Al-Qarara when they emerged from a tunnel and attacked an Israeli tank.

Over 30 rockets were fired at Israel, and 49 targets were struck in Gaza.

==== 10 August ====
After Israel has previously stated they will not negotiate while under rocket fire, Hamas and the PIJ stated they would leave Cairo on 10 August if Israel did not attend negotiations. Later it was announced that Israel and the Palestinian factions accepted a three-day ceasefire, beginning midnight.

In the afternoon, the Kerem Shalom border crossing was closed, due to rocket fire landing in the area, for the protection of the workers. Much of the food and aid that enters Gaza goes through this crossing, and were unable to be transferred during that time. Later, the IDF discovered and attacked six militants attempting to use the crossing to enter Israel, killing all of them.

Turkey announced in the evening that they would utilize the 72 hour ceasefire to evacuate wounded Palestinians to their hospitals.

Before midnight, as in the other ceasefire, both sides took final shots at each other. Israel successfully targeted and killed Faraj Abu Raviah, a Hamas militant who was active in the tunnel network of northern Gaza Strip, while in a tunnel in Gaza. A series of rockets was fired from Gaza at various locations around Israel, including Eshkol, Ashdod, Gush Dan, and Tel Aviv.

==== 11 August ====
In the morning, as the ceasefire appeared to hold, Egypt's foreign ministry announced that they opened the Rafah border crossing to allow aid into Gaza, although some Gaza residents claimed the crossing was still closed. Hamas official Izzat al-Risheq, a member of the Hamas negotiating team in Cairo, announced that Hamas does not object to Fatah policemen manning the Rafah crossing.

In the afternoon, the UN announced a fact finding mission, whose members will be William Schabas, Amal Clooney and Doudou Diène. Later, Clooney turned down the offer, due to other commitments. Israel claimed that the committee, and particularly the chairman Schabas, is biased against Israel, pointing to previous comments by Schabas, including calls for Israeli Prime Minister Benjamin Netanyahu to be tried before the International Criminal Court. Israel referred to the inquiry as a kangaroo court. Canadian Foreign Minister John Baird called the UN Human Rights Council a "sham" for appointing the committee, and said the committee is a "shame" and will do nothing to promote peace.

=== Week 6 ===
==== 12 August ====
The Turkish Humanitarian Relief Foundation (IHH) announced a new attempt to breach the Israeli naval blockade of Gaza.

As talks in Cairo continued, varying reports stated that progress was being made toward a long term ceasefire, although Israel still did not agree to building a seaport or an airport in Gaza.

Hamas claimed that the Israeli Navy violated the ceasefire and fired at Gaza. Israel maintains that a fishing boat attempted to leave the permitted fishing zone, and that the Navy then fired warning shots at the boat.

==== 13 August ====
During the night, the UK announced that if the fighting in Gaza continued after the ceasefire, they would suspend their military sales to Israel, while investigating whether they have been used properly.

In the late morning, Al-Aqsa radio again reported that Israel was in violation of the ceasefire, by firing on Beit Lahiya. Later reports from Gaza medical facilities corrected the earlier reports, stating 6 were killed in an attempt to disable Israeli missiles that had not exploded. Two journalists were killed in Beit Lahiya along with three Hamas police engineers and three other people by an unexploded Israeli bomb that detonated as a police engineering team was working to neutralize it. The two journalists, who had been reporting on the efforts to defuse the bomb, were Simone Camilli, an Italian video journalist working for the Associated Press, and Ali Shehda Abu Afash, a Palestinian journalist who had been working with Camilli.

Hamas originally scheduled a press conference for 21:30, when they were expected to announce that the ceasefire talks failed. Israel however has agreed to extend the ceasefire an additional 72 hours. At 21:45, few hours prior to the end of the ceasefire, sirens were heard in Ashkelon, in which the rocket landed in an open area. Israeli police later confirmed that an additional rocket from Gaza landed in Sha'ar HaNegev. Hamas spokesman Sami Abu Zuhri denied any rocket fire.

The Palestinian factions, shortly before the ceasefire expired, announced the extension of the ceasefire by five days. Despite the ceasefire extension announcement, shortly before midnight the Iron Dome intercepted a rocket over Netivot, while two more landed in open areas.

==== 14 August ====
During the night, despite the ceasefire still in effect, Netanyahu ordered the IDF to retaliate for the rocket fire. Israel struck four targets in Gaza, followed by two more rockets fired from Gaza into Israel.

The US confirmed that it has suspended the sale of Hellfire Missiles to Israel due to the current conflict.

==== 15 August ====
PIJ officer Ziad al-Nakhaleh stated that even if a lasting agreement isn't achieved by Monday, the ceasefire will continue, in addition to confirming that the seaport and airport talks have been postponed.

A report by al-Shorouk stated that the 11 terms of the ceasefire are:

- Israel will halt military actions in Gaza by land, air or sea.
- All Palestinian factions in Gaza will stop all attacks against Israel by land, air or sea.
- The openings between Israel and Gaza for the transfer of goods to rebuild Gaza will be determined between Israel and the Palestinian Authority.
- Israel and PA will coordinate all issues of funds related to Gaza's reconstruction.
- The elimination of the buffer zones along the security fence, in stages, with the deployment of PA troops.
- The fishing zone in stages will be extended to 12 miles, coordinated by Israel and the PA.
- Israel will assist the PA in rebuilding infrastructure destroyed in Gaza as well as assisting those whose homes were destroyed.
- International aid groups will provide the basic products needed to rebuild Gaza.
- Egypt implores the international community to provide swift humanitarian and monetary assistance for Gaza's reconstruction.
- The exchange of prisoners and remains will also be discussed at a later time.
- The seaport and airport will be discussed at a later time

==== 16 August ====
Palestinians in Cairo tell Israel to meet their demands or "face a long war." Israeli officials stated that if talks in Cairo fail, it will be up to the UN Security Council to negotiate a truce.

==== 17 August ====
Israel responded to Palestinian demands by saying that no demands will be met without security being guaranteed in Israel, including the demilitarization of Gaza. As a sign of good faith, Israel removed the fishing blockade and allowed Gazan fishermen to fish up to the three miles out.

==== 18 August ====
In the evening, as the five-day ceasefire neared an end, Netanyahu stated that they are prepared for any scenario in Gaza. In preparation for possible restart of violence, the train to Sderot was canceled, so they could be fortified to protect against anti-tank missile attacks on them.

Israel arrested 93 Hamas activists, who were planning a third intifada by overthrowing the PA, according to the Shin Bet.

Later in the evening, reports began circulating that Israel and the Palestinian factions had agreed to a long term ceasefire, which would be signed and announced at 23:00. The Palestinians later confirmed they had accepted the ceasefire.

=== Week 7 ===
==== 19 August ====
Overnight news leaked that the US and Israel came to an agreement over the blockade of Gaza. Israel agreed to ease the blockade and in exchange, the US will use their international influence to prevent Hamas from rearming.

In the afternoon, shortly before 16:00, three rockets fired from Gaza exploded outside of Be'er Sheva, breaking the ceasefire with the first action by either side in nearly 6 days. Shortly before the rocket fire, Hamas spokesman Fawzi Barhoum stated "If Netanyahu doesn't understand … the language of politics in Cairo, we know how to make him understand," possibly hinting at the rocket fire, although Hamas denied involvement in the rocket fire. Netanyahu ordered the IDF to retaliate against the renewed fire, and ordered the negotiators to return from Cairo due to the violations.

At about 18:30 the Iron Dome intercepted two rockets over Netivot, its first interception in over a week. Later, two rockets were shot down over Sderot and another two over Be'er Sheva, as well as several fired at Tel Aviv, which Hamas took credit for.

Hamas announced that they blame Israel for the ending of the ceasefire. The US however has stated that they hold Hamas responsible for breaking the ceasefire and reiterated Israel's right to defend itself. According to a senior Fatah official Qatar threatened Hamas' political bureau chief Khaled Mashal that it would expel him if Hamas accepts the Egyptian ceasefire deal.

Israel attempted to assassinate the chief commander of Hamas' military wing, Mohammad Deif, in an airstrike on his house in the Sheikh Radwan district of Gaza City, killing his wife and two children. Israeli intelligence concluded in April 2015 that Deif had survived the assassination attempt, the fifth Israeli attempt to assassinate him.

In total 50 rockets were fired from Gaza at Israel, and Israel struck 30 targets in Gaza, on 19 August.

==== 20 August ====
In the morning, reports leaked that Qatar threatened to expel Khaled Mashaal if Hamas accepted the Egyptian ceasefire.

Hamas threatened to fire additional rockets at Ben Gurion on 21 August as 06:00. Their warning stated that all airlines should cancel their flights.

On 20 August from Gaza 168 rockets were fired at Israel, a record since the operation began, accounting for over 200 rockets since the conflict resumed. In response, Israel carried out 92 attacks into Gaza.

==== 21 August ====
In the morning the IDF killed three Hamas commanders in an airstrike:

- Raed al Atar – The commander of Hamas' Rafah company and member of its high military council; participated heavily in attacks against Israel, including the kidnapping of Gilad Shalit.
- Muhammad Abu Shamala – The head of its southern command, believed by Israel to have been involved in every attack from Rafah since 2001.
- Mohammed Barhoum – Commander of the southern sector

All three were also heavy involved with the cross-border tunnels. Attar and Abu Shamaleh were also believed to have been involved in the attack in which Hadar Goldin was killed and his body seized. Hamas said that Israel would not break their resistance, and would pay a heavy price for their crimes.

The IDF in the afternoon called up 10,000 reservists. Hamas killed 3 Palestinians and seven were arrested.

==== 22 August ====
In the morning Hamas shot dead 11 Palestinians it suspected of being informants for Israel at an abandoned police station, and another seven near a mosque. Hamas warned that others would soon be killed.

Violence in the south continued. A Grad rocket fired from Gaza hit a synagogue in Ashdod, injuring three civilians In the afternoon Grad rockets were fired toward Gush Dan. In Sha'ar Hanegev a 4 year old Israeli child was killed in a mortar attack on kibbutz Nahal Oz. The Israeli Prime Minister said that military operations would intensify in response. At least 130 rockets were reported to have been fired, of which some were intercepted; others caused some damage and injuries. A rocket attack on Gan Yavne fatally wounded an IDF soldier who was on home leave from his unit after having served in the war. He died of his injuries a week later. Five others were also injured in the attack, including the soldier's younger brother. The IDF initially carried out about 30 airstrikes in Gaza, killing seven people according to the Gaza Health Ministry. Later, an Israeli airstrike destroyed a building in Gaza. The Palestinians reported at least 12 dead and dozens wounded. It was reported that 20 militants were killed and 50 wounded in the attack.

==== 23 August ====
In the early afternoon the IDF stated that more than 100 rockets and mortars were fired into Israel since midnight.

Hamas killed four more Palestinians for collaborating with Israel, saying that they had been tried based on evidence. An aid to Palestinian Authority President Mahmoud Abbas condemned the executions as "provocative," illegal, and without a fair trial. Amnesty International said "Hamas must also remember that the right to a fair trial before a competent court remains in force during times of armed conflict".

An apartment complex, known as Al Zafer Tower 4, collapsed after an Israeli strike which was preceded by roof knocking to warn the residents. According to the IDF, the building was used as one of the headquarters for Hamas.

An unnamed Israeli army intelligence officer said that Hamas had over 2,000 short-range rockets and many dozens of mid-range rockets left, less than 30% of those they had before the operation started.

==== 24 August ====
Israel assassinated senior Hamas official Mohammed al-Ghoul, who was Hamas' payroll head, in an airstrike on his car in northern Gaza. He had just taken $13 million from a contact who had smuggled it into Gaza from the Sinai which was to be used to pay the salaries of Hamas fighters. The cash he had taken was destroyed, which severely impacted Hamas' ability to pay salaries.

In the afternoon a mortar wounded three Israeli Arabs who worked as taxi drivers tasked with taking a group of Gazans from the crossing into Israel for medical care. About 135 rockets and mortar shells were fired on 24 August; five fell in built-up areas, ten were intercepted, and the remainder exploded in Israeli territory.

Five rockets from south Lebanon were fired into northern Israel early in the morning, the Lebanese Army later located the launcher used. The rockets caused an electrical power failure and injuries in two kids. Israel did not return fire but appealed to the United Nations Interim Force in Lebanon to investigate.

Five rockets were fired from Syria into the Israeli-occupied Golan Heights. The IDF later assessed that rocket fire was unintentional and was a stray rocket from the Syrian Civil War.

The Israeli Prime Minister said "I call on the inhabitants of Gaza to vacate immediately every site from which Hamas is carrying out terrorist activity. Every one of these places is a target for us."

==== 25 August ====
In the early morning hours news began to leak of Abbas's new plan for an independent Palestinian state, which would be announced on 26 August. In the first stage of the plan, Abbas would request from the UN a deadline for Israeli withdrawal to the 1967 borders. The response from the Israeli Prime Minister's office indicated that Israel would oppose a withdrawal

Hamas, one day after Iran claimed it down an Israeli drone, claimed it as well had downed an Israeli drone over Gaza.

In the afternoon, according to an unnamed Palestinian source said to be familiar with the issue, the Palestinian factions would agree to a monthlong ceasefire proposed by Egypt in order to restart truce talks in Cairo. Egyptian mediators were awaiting Israeli approval before formally announcing the plan on Monday evening

Hamas POWs interrogated by the IDF revealed that Hamas does in fact use mosques in Gaza for military operations. They also revealed that their tunnels were strategically built near kindergartens and clinics.

In the late evening, a rocket once again was fired from Lebanon into Israel, landing in the Upper Galilee. The IDF returned fire toward the source of the rocket launch.

More than 120 rockets and mortars have been fired from the Gaza Strip.

=== Week 8 ===
==== 26 August ====
Gazan sources reported that overnight Israel struck a 13-story building in Gaza known as the Italian Tower, after firing three warning shots into the building, which contained a mix of residences, offices (including the Ministry of Public Works), and retail stores. Two were reported killed, about 20 injured, and most of the complex was destroyed. Hamas fired at sick Gazans as they tried to leave the Strip for treatment Three Salafist militants in Rafah were killed in an Israeli airstrike as they fired rockets at Israel.

The head of the Palestinian delegation to the Cairo cease-fire talks, said that difference of opinion among different Palestinian groups was delaying an agreement. Hamas stated that the wording in the new Egyptian ceasefire proposal was acceptable to them, stating "we're prepared to discuss at a later stage the various controversial issues: the sea port, the prisoners and the airport, what's important at this stage is ending the Israeli aggression, opening the crossings and rebuilding the Strip." In hopes to restart future peace talks, the US sent Marine Corps general John Allen to Israel as a negotiator.

During the day, rockets hit a house and kindergarten playground. Two Israeli civilians were killed and four were injured in a mortar attack on kibbutz Nirim. A border crossing used by Gazans seeking medical treatment in Israel, among others, was under frequent rocket fire. Power lines were damaged in the Eshkol Region.

Hamas, and Islamic Jihad accepted an Egyptian ceasefire draft at 19:00 for a month. Hamas claimed it was accepted by both sides, and that they were waiting for a Cairo to determine the zero hour for implementation. Israel approved the ceasefire. The ceasefire was infringed. Egypt agreed to open the Israel–Gaza barrier.

It was reported that the cease-fire was accepted by Netanyahu without a cabinet vote, leading Bennett to call for a vote on the proposed Gaza ceasefire.

In Gaza, Hamas declared victory during a news conference, and television showed Palestinians celebrating in the streets, with some waving the Hamas flag and others waving the Palestinian Authority flag. The truce came into effect at 19:00 on 26 August; in the previous day over 182 rockets and mortar bombs were fired at Israel, 143 of them falling in open areas and five in residential areas, while 27 were intercepted. Since the collapse of a ceasefire the week before, over 1,045 rockets and mortars were fired at Israel, 141 of which were intercepted.

== Status following start of August 26 cease-fire ==
As of 26 August 2014, when a month-long ceasefire was agreed to by both parties, nearly 2,000 people had been killed in Gaza, as well as 69 Israelis. It was estimated that reconstruction in the Gaza Strip after damage suffered in this conflict would take 10 years. After Hamas had declared victory, Israeli sources said that the IDF had struck 5,200 "terror targets" in Gaza and killed 1,000 "terrorists", that Hamas had received "the worst blow in its history", and that over 4,500 rockets had been fired into Israel. The UN estimated that at least 100,000 Gazans had been internally displaced following Operation Protective Edge.

== Political status ==
=== Israel ===
After the first comments of Netanyahu on August, opinions differ. Hamas wants to persuade the Gazans that it has won a victory, but others wonder if the costs of the battle were worth it.

The cost of the war was economically and socially expensive as the Governor Karnit Flug states that she agrees with an increase the budget deficit for 2015 from 2.5% to 3% provided it stems from one-time requirements for covering the costs of Operation Protective Edge and its results. Some will said that the war started after Israel opposed to the unity government of Palestinian Authority with Fatah and Hamas and as result, the negotiations plunged into crisis. Supposedly, those actions gave a validated to Hamas to kidnapping and kill the three teenage boys, which end, in fact, with an agreement with Hamas about ceasefire.

Other said that Hamas is a terrorist argumentation that uses the suffer and the pain in Gaza for his own purpose. Netanyahu by himself told, all ready, that Hamas is adamantly opposed to negotiations with Israel, and that the reason why so soon, after the sign deal, they were shooting from Gaza towards Israel. Even after the fighting ends Hamas warned that this was only an interlude in Hamas' fight against Israel. Therefore, the agreement with Hamas let for nothing, not only Israel had loss money and lives, she also get nothing because Hamas still control in Gaza and become even stronger in Gaza. The head of the Central Committee of Netanyahu's Likud party told "We promised the voters we would be decisive against Hamas, but when we had the chance we hesitated. It's only a matter of time until we will have to face Hamas again." The fact that Netanyahu didn't call the cabinet for a vote show that he was afraid of the opposition.

Netanyahu's right flank in the government has been sharpening its knives even before the fighting with Hamas began and by the middle of the fighting, Minister Avigdor Lieberman reported to the media that Likud Yisrael Beiteinu dismantles partnership with Likud-Beiteinu. Liberman reported that "Israel can't ensure safety of citizens in the South as long as Hamas rules Gaza", in additional he said, "It is impossible and forbidden to trust lowly murderers. Therefore, we are against a cease-fire that allows Hamas to rearm and wage another battle against Israel whenever it finds it comfortable...A real peace process and a strategic breakthrough will only be possible after we succeed in freeing the Middle East and the Palestinians from the threat of Hamas (and no one else will do so in our place)" Others have sniped at Netanyahu for his handling of the crucial US-Israel relationship, "He shouldn't have gone into a direct confrontation with the Americans," Israeli Knesset member David Tzur.

In response, on 27 August, Netanyahu, in his first comments, told that Hamas was hit hard and won few concessions. He also said that the goal of the opening Operation Protective Edge was not brings down Hamas but a long-term calm and inflicting substantial damage to "terrorist infrastructure". Israeli officials emphasized that there were no direct talks with Hamas because the Palestinian delegation was headed by a Palestinian Authority official. Israel already open the border crossings reopen. In addition Israel prevent many attacks. A source close to Prime Minister Benjamin Netanyahu said "not an arrangement; it is a cease-fire…a comprehensive deal will be possible only after the two sides discuss the various demands in a month's time." On 28 August, at the Morning Show, "Keshet – Morning" it was reported that Israel also respected the requests of the Arab countries which worried to citizens of Gaza.

Skeptical citizens in the South said that they lost there trust in the Government. Many believe that the goods planned to enter Gaza under international supervision will fall into the hands of Hamas. Eshkol Regional Council Mayor: "We'll see what happens in the coming days, I don't think the cease-fire will last," Although Netanyahu standing that Israel would not accept any further rocket fire, and if the attacks resumed, Israel would react with even more force.

On 1 September, it was reported by BBC that Israel intended to "expropriate 4 sq km (1.5 sq miles) of Palestinian land in the occupied West Bank". The military-run local administration said it was a response to the kidnapping and killing of three Jewish teenagers in the area in June.

On 7 July, political source warns Hamas rebuilding Gaza warfare tunnels despite the ceasefire. Lieberman response that he does not believe it is possible to demilitarize Gaza. Meantime, Mahmoud al-Zahar continues to threaten, "If the Palestinian resistance in the West Bank held a quarter of the tools at the disposal of the resistance in Gaza – Israel would be demolished in a day."

=== Gaza and PA ===
The celebration took hold for two days. Two men were killed during the celebration. Abu Obeida, a spokesman for the Hamas military wing, stood over an Israeli flag as he addressed the crowd. "Gaza achieved victory because it has done what major armies failed to do. It forced the enemy to retreat," he said. "We must know that no voice is louder than the voice of the resistance." , "We are here today to declare the victory of the resistance, the victory of Gaza, with the help of God, and the steadfastness of our people and the noble resistance," Hamas spokesman Sami Abu said in a news conference at Gaza's Shifa Hospital. Zuhri also said that their main goal is to liberating Jerusalem.

Abbas associates said that the PA would take legal action against Israel in The Hague, home to the International Criminal Court and the International Court of Justice. on 1 September,

It appears that the unity government of Hamas Fatah is in crisis. There were allegations that Hamas abused Fatah members during Gaza war. They harassed, beaten and in some cases even killed Fatah members. Fatah source said, "they are just closed minded, unethical racist people who discriminate against non-Hamas people" In addition, on 1 September, Abbas told that Mashaal is a liar because Hamas worked to bring down the PA ever since its establishment. As mentioned, on 18 August Israel arrested 93 Hamas men, which tried to carry out a coup of the Palestinian Authority.

Abbas was quoted as saying, "Hamas's goal is to destroy the West Bank and create chaos in order to stage a coup against us. Hamas wants to drive me crazy. Since the kidnapping of [IDF soldier] Gilad Schalit they have been contacting the Americans and Israelis and Europeans and others. They have been doing things behind our backs." He also point out about the murder of the three youths, "When I asked Mashaal [about the murder of the three youths] he replied: 'I don't know.' Then he told me, 'I neither deny nor confirm.' Lies and beating around the bush." Abbas pointed out that Saleh Arouri, later confirmed that his movement had been behind the murder of the youths. Mashaal denied the claim. After Operation Protective Edge, support for Hamas rises, 61 percent of Palestinians say they would vote for Hamas.

On 6 September, there were made first hints for the ending of the unity government. Abbas called in the media that "We won't accept the continuation of the situation with Hamas as it is now and in this shape. There must be one authority and one regime." He also reported that Hamas killed 120 men who defied because the house arrest imposed on them. Meanwhile, U.S. opposed for Abbas' diplomatic plan since it is a unilateral Palestinians say, Herzog asked Abbas to avoid unilateral moves at the United Nations "that might hamper the chances for an agreement." Herzog added that he supports "real negotiations based on security and the fixing of borders as a first step." Despite this Abbas would be expected to bring the plan for a vote in the United Nations General Assembly but in any case, the General Assembly resolutions are not binding.

On 7 September, during the speech at Arab League, Abbas interrupted after he mention the revolution made by Hamas in 2007. It reported that the session was planned to be closed to media. Hamas officials responded to Abbas's allegations by urging him to stop "inciting" against them. The Palestinian Ma'an News Agency reported today that in a speech given to Fatah Party on Sunday, Abbas said that the Egyptian government offer to the PA 618-square mile area of the Sinai adjacent to Gaza. Abbas rejected the offer.

=== Arab countries ===
Qatari media which knows that Qatar's support of Hamas calling Hamas' efforts a victory.

On Al-Akhbar, Lebanese media, reported as the end of the firecaese that "Israel in shock: Intelligence failure in handling the rockets", and other media say that Israel had caved to Hamas' demands.

Egypt which has a strong opponent of the Muslim Brotherhood condemns Israeli action in Gaza but thoughts that the actions of Hamas lead for nothing, only to more pain and suffering of the citizens's Gaza, while "The Hamas movement continues listening to voices from Qatar and Khaled Mashal who stays there and enjoys his time at the gym of one of the most luxurious hotels in Qatar"

=== United States ===
U.S. Secretary of State John Kerry said Tuesday that the United States welcomed the newly announced cease-fire. "We strongly support today's cease-fire agreement, and call on all parties to fully and completely comply with its terms. ... We are all aware that this is an opportunity, not a certainty."

== See also ==
- List of Israeli strikes and Palestinian casualties in the 2014 Israel–Gaza conflict
- List of Palestinian rocket attacks on Israel, 2014
