= Ayman Taha =

Hamas official and spokesman (d. 2014)

Personal details
- Died: 7 August 2014
- Party: Hamas

Ayman Taha (Arabic: أيمن طه) (died 7 August 2014) was a senior Hamas official and the organization's spokesman in the Gaza Strip. Taha was the son of a co-founder of Hamas and The New York Times claimed he was also a former "Hamas fighter".

== Early life ==
Ayman was born to Mohammad Taha, a co-founder of Hamas and director at the Islamic University of Gaza. In 1998, Ayman Taha served as President of the university's Student Council. He later served as a commander of the Izz al-Din al-Qassam Brigades in Bureij during the Second Intifada in the early 2000s.

== Hamas ==
After the Hamas takeover of the Gaza Strip in June 2007, Taha became the group's spokesman for the territory. In February 2009, after returning from a Palestinian delegation in Egypt discussing a long-term truce with Israel, Egyptian authorities prevented Taha from entering the Gaza Strip with over $11 million. Instead, he deposited it in an Egyptian bank in al-Arish. On 30 March, he announced in a discussion on a Nazareth-based radio station the Hamas "would not remain open forever" concerning the release of Israeli soldier Gilad Shalit. In July 2009, Taha noted that a "culture of resistance" was being promoted in Gaza after the Gaza War, stating "Armed resistance is still important and legitimate, but we have a new emphasis on cultural resistance... After the war, the fighters needed a break and the people needed a break."

== Accusations of corruption ==
In February 2014, Ayman Taha was arrested and investigated for "misconduct, illegal profiteering, and betrayal of trust".

== Death ==
Taha was killed by a Hamas firing squad during Operation Protective Edge. Hamas accused him of being an Egyptian spy and executed him at point blank range. One source claims that he was executed because he may implicate several Hamas officials in a corruption scandal. Later, they blamed Israel for being responsible for his death, claiming he died from an Israeli airstrike.

== Bibliography ==
- Gunning, Jeroen (2008), Hamas in politics: democracy, religion, violence, Columbia University Press, ISBN 978-0-231-70044-3
