= Mohammad Taha (Hamas) =

Palestinian militant (1937–2014)

Mohammad Taha (Arabic: محمد طه; 1937 – November 2014) was a Palestinian militant who was a co-founding member of the Islamic Resistance Movement (Hamas), who was arrested by the IDF in 2003. On May 5, 2004, after being held 14 months without trial, Taha was released back to Gaza. His son, Ayman Taha, was a spokesman and former fighter for Hamas in the Gaza Strip. Taha died in November 2014, after being hospitalised with a heart complaint.
