= Gaitanism =

Colombian political movement led by Jorge Eliécer Gaitán

Gaitanism (Spanish: Gaitanismo) was a Colombian political and social movement led by politician Jorge Eliécer Gaitán. It emerged as a significant force within Colombian liberalism during the 1940s, attracting support among workers and peasants. Its political discourse emphasized the opposition between the people and the traditional political oligarchy.

== History ==
Gaitanism developed from Gaitán's political activities and criticism of Colombia's traditional political leadership. In 1933, he founded the National Leftist Revolutionary Union (UNIR), an independent political organization that sought to advance his interpretation of liberal and social reform. He later returned to the Liberal Party.

The movement became particularly influential from 1944 onwards. Gaitán challenged the established Liberal leadership and campaigned for the presidency in the 1946 Colombian presidential election. Although he lost to Conservative candidate Mariano Ospina Pérez, Gaitanism continued to grow. In 1947, Gaitán was recognized as the sole leader of the Liberal Party, following the movement's electoral successes and growing influence.

On 7 February 1948, Gaitán led the March of Silence in Bogotá, a mass demonstration against political violence. On 9 April, he was assassinated, triggering the Bogotazo and intensifying the period of civil conflict known as La Violencia. His death deprived the movement of its central leader, although Gaitanist political ideas and identities continued to influence Colombian politics.

== Political ideas ==
Gaitanism criticized political patronage and the concentration of power among traditional elites. It promoted popular political participation and presented the interests of ordinary Colombians as distinct from those of the established political class. Historians have frequently examined the movement through the framework of Latin American populism, although its precise ideological characterization remains debated.

Gaitan’s political ideas are associated with left-wing populism and social democracy with some elements of democratic socialism.
