= Carlos Arango Vélez =

Colombian politician (1897–1974)

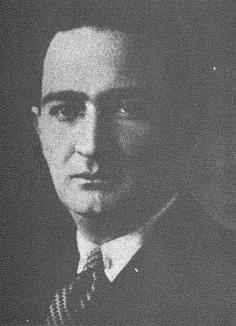

Presidential Designate
- In office August 5, 1946 – November 29, 1946
- President: Alberto Lleras Camargo
- Preceded by: Alberto Lleras Camargo
- Succeeded by: Eduardo Santos Montejo

Mayor of Bogotá
- In office October 1935 – March 1936
- Appointed by: Alfonso López Pumarejo
- Preceded by: Jorge Merchán
- Succeeded by: Francisco José Arévalo

Minister of War and Navy
- In office July 28, 1931 – November 27, 1931
- President: Enrique Olaya Herrera
- Preceded by: Carlos Adolfo Urueta
- Succeeded by: Alfonso Araújo Gaviria

Personal details
- Born: February 13, 1897 Bogotá, Cundinamarca, Colombia
- Died: October 12, 1974 (aged 77) Bogotá, D.C., Colombia
- Resting place: Central Cemetery of Bogotá
- Party: Liberal; National Leftist Revolutionary Union
- Spouse: María Vega Jaramillo
- Parent(s): Carmelo Arango Martínez; Cristina Vélez Racero
- Relatives: María Cristina; María Isabel; María Elvira Arango Vega
- Occupation: Politician, lawyer

Carlos Arango Vélez (Bogotá, February 13, 1897 – ibidem, October 12, 1974) was a Colombian jurist and Liberal Party politician.

Arango Vélez held several public offices, such as Mayor of Bogotá (1935–1936), Minister of War (1931), and Parliamentarian, where he stood out as a skilled orator. He was defeated by Alfonso López Pumarejo in his 1942 run for President of Colombia. Following his loss, he became increasingly close to the progressive sector of conservatism.

He was father-in-law to Colombian president Misael Pastrana Borrero.

== Life ==
Carlos Arango Vélez was born in Bogotá on February 13, 1897, in the affluent home of two parents from the Atlantic Coast of Colombia who settled in the city.

Arango Vélez completed his basic studies at the University of the Rosary, then studied Law at the National University. He received postgraduate degrees in Criminal Law in Rome and in Sociology in Florence, Italy.

He began his political career as a secretary, and was later put in charge of the Colombian Consulate in Rome from 1914 to 1918 under the presidency of conservative José Vicente Concha.

=== Minister of War (1931) ===
He was appointed Minister of War and the Navy by liberal president Enrique Olaya Herrera, serving from July 28 to November 27 of 1931. During his brief time as Minister, he initiated the Colombia-Peru War, the last war to be declared by Colombia against another country.

Prior to the war, skirmishes were taking place that led the ministry to acquire better weapons in the face of the threat of a war. Arango Vélez managed the acquisition of new machine guns, rifles, and a war flotilla.

=== Separation from and return to the Liberal Party ===
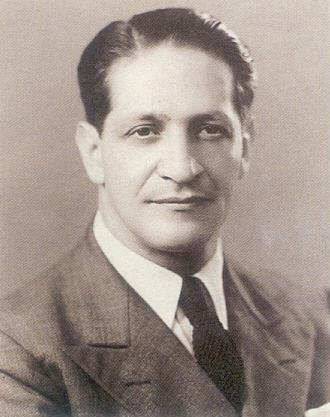
Jorge Eliécer Gaitán, head of the National Leftist Revolutionary Union, in the mid-1930s

In 1933, Arango Vélez decided to separate himself from the official liberalism (of the Colombian Liberal Party), due to some political actions that compromised President Olaya with the conservatives. In response, he joined the National Leftist Revolutionary Union (Spanish: Unión Nacional de Izquierda Revolucionaria, UNIR) founded, primarily, by the influential liberal lawyer Jorge Eliécer Gaitán.

Emblem the National Leftist Revolutionary Union, a party that Arango was a part of between 1933 and 1935.

To promote UNIR, Arango Vélez and Gaitán founded the newspaper El Unirismo and sought agrarian reform, which the new president, Alfonso López Pumarejo, would implement in 1936.

However, the harassment that the movement suffered from Liberals and Conservatives alike, allegations of closeness to communists that marginalized it, and its failure in the 1935 parliamentary elections led Arango Vélez and Gaitán to dissolve the movement and return to the official ranks of the Liberal Party.

=== Mayorship of Bogotá (1935–1936) ===
For his return to the Liberal Party, Arango Vélez was appointed Superior Mayor of Bogotá by President López Pumarejo, holding the position from October 1935 to March 1936 (Gaitán would later do the same between 1936 and 1937). During his mayoralty, he gave an award-winning speech on Russian socialist Rosa Luxemburg at the Teatro Colón.

Arango Vélez was also a professor of Criminal Law at the National University of Colombia during those years. He directed the Colombian Newspaper El Nacional, was a Representative in the Chamber, and a Senator for several periods. He was also Colombia's ambassador to the Holy See in 1942, at the request of outgoing President Eduardo Santos.

=== Presidential candidacy ===
Arango Vélez launched his presidential candidacy for the 1942 elections supported by the radical sector of the Liberal Party, and with the approval of Laureano Gómez, president of the Conservative Party. With his candidacy, Arango Vélez aimed to confront the ruling Liberal Party, which was supporting the re-election of former President Alfonso López Pumarejo.

Among his conservative allies were the young lawyer Misael Pastrana Borrero (who was a protégé of businessman Mariano Ospina Pérez), and the Santista sector of the Liberal Party, led by former president Eduardo Santos, who were the minority in the party. In addition to the support of Jorge Eliecer Gaitán himself, he brought together communists and radical liberals. Despite this coalition of support, former president López Pumarejo defeated Arango Vélez by close to an 8-point margin.

=== Relationship with the Conservative Party ===
Despite his defeat as a dissident liberal in 1942, his loyalty to conservatism made him a key player during the government of Ospina Pérez, who was elected president of Colombia in 1946 after the chaotic second government of López, who was forced to resign in 1945, leaving power in the hands of Pérez, his Interior Minister.

As a result of the division of the Liberal Party, one sector supporting Gabriel Turbay's official candidacy, one Jorge Eliécer Gaitán's, and another Darío Echandía's, which never materialized, the conservatives regained power after losing it in 1930. Within the Ospina government, he held the position of Vice President of Colombia in 1946.

His ties with the conservatives did not stop there; in 1951, his eldest daughter married Misael Pastrana, whom she met in 1950, when Arango Vélez was acting as Colombia's Ambassador to the Holy See and Pope Pius XI under then president-elect Laureano Gómez. In office, with the support of his now son-in-law, he renegotiated the terms of the papal concordat.

President Gómez appointed him Ambassador to Brazil; he remained in this position even during the dictatorship of Gustavo Rojas Pinilla, until his resignation in 1955, following the closure of the liberal newspaper El Tiempo (owned by Eduardo Santos) by the military government.

=== National Front ===
After the dictatorship, in 1958, he was again appointed by liberal president Alberto Lleras Camargo as Ambassador to the Holy See, this time under Pope Juan XIII, remaining in the office until 1960. In 1969, he supported the candidacy of his son-in-law Misael Pastrana, who was elected in a disputed election on April 19, 1970.

=== Final years ===
Arango Vélez died in Bogotá on October 12, 1974, just months after his son-in-law left the presidency on August 7, 1974. He was 77 years old and had been hospitalized for several days at the prestigious Shaio Clinic (Spanish: Clínica de Shaio). The Liberal Party, President Alfonso López Michelsen, and the Ospino-Pastranista sector of the Conservative Party led his posthumous tributes.

His remains were taken to the chapel at the traditional Gimnasio Moderno school, and currently rest in the Central Cemetery of Bogotá.

== Family ==
Arango Vélez was the son of Carmelo Arango Martínez and his wife, Cristina Vélez Racero, both born on the Atlantic Coast of Colombia.

=== Marriage ===
Arango Vélez married María Vega Jaramillo, who was a member of several prominent families at the time of Colombia's Independence, with blood ties to Jorge Tadeo Lozano and even Antonio Nariño and Domingo Caycedo.

María "Maruja" Vega was the granddaughter of Clementina Portocarrero Caycedo, who, in turn, was the great-niece of Domingo Caycedo through her mother Dolores Caycedo. Clementina was also the great-niece of Jorge Tadeo Lozano through her father José María Portocarrero y Ricaurte, the great-grandson of Jorge Miguel Lozano, father of Jorge Tadeo.

=== Children and descendants ===
From his marriage to María Vega, their three daughters María Cristina, María Isabel, and María Elvira Arango Vega were born.

María Cristina Arango married Huila politician Misael Pastrana Borrero, president of Colombia from 1970 to 1974, and from this union Juan Carlos, Andrés, Jaime, and Cristina Pastrana Arango were born. Juan Carlos Pastrana is a journalist, and Andrés Pastrana is a prominent politician who was president from 1998 to 2002.

María Isabel Arango married Francisco Vargas Holguín, grandson of former president Jorge Holguín Mallarino and Cecilia Arboleda Mosquera, the daughter of former president Julio Arboleda and Sofía Mosquera Hurtado, granddaughter of Tomás Cipriano de Mosquera. Vargas Holguín was also the great-nephew of former president Carlos Holguín Mallarino.

== Tributes ==
- Law 196 of 1995.
- Colegio Carlos Arango Vélez, a Primary School in Bogotá.

== Published works ==
- Lo que yo se de la guerra, 1933.
