= Andrés Baiz =

Colombian film director and screenwriter (born 1975)

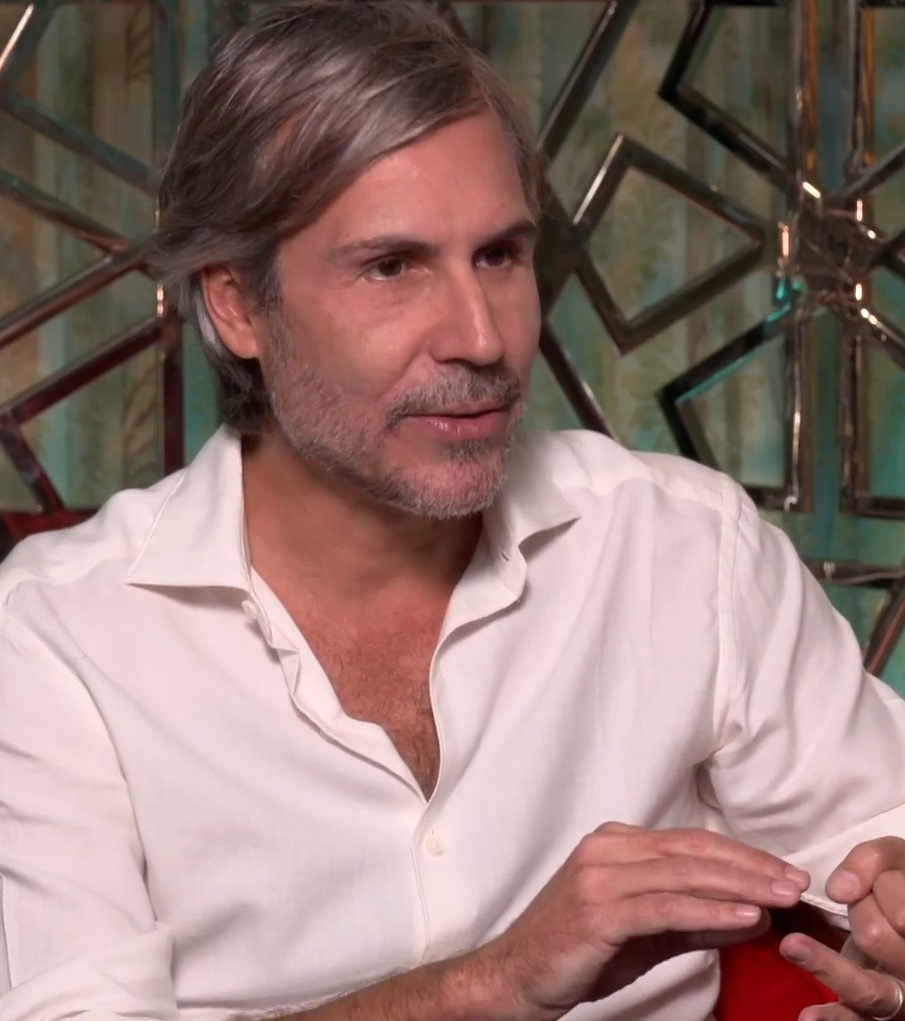
- Baiz in 2024
- Born: Andrés Baiz Ochoa; 1975 (age 50–51); Cali, Colombia
- Other name: Andi Baiz
- Education: NYU Tisch School of the Arts
- Occupations: Director, screenwriter
- Years active: 2007–present

Andrés Baiz Ochoa (born 1975), also known as Andi Baiz, is a Colombian film director and screenwriter. His first feature film, Satanás (2007), was based on the novel of the same name by Mario Mendoza and won the awards for best film and best actor at the Monte Carlo Film Festival. He is also known for directing the feature films The Hidden Face (2011) and Roa (2013), and for his television work on Metástasis, Narcos, Narcos: Mexico, The Sandman and Griselda.

== Life ==
=== Early life and education ===
Baiz was born in Cali, Valle del Cauca, Colombia, in 1975. He went on to study film production and directing at New York University Tisch School of the Arts, majoring in Film and Television with a minor in Cinema Studies and additional coursework in film theory. After graduating, he was mentored by French director Raphael Nadjari, with whom he produced four horror short films. From 2001 to 2004 he worked as a director, producer and editor at the New York–based production company Centro-Films, and during the same period also wrote film criticism for Loft magazine. He additionally worked in the production departments of the feature films Bringing Out the Dead, Zoolander, Cremaster 2, Maria Full of Grace and The Fittest.

=== Early short films ===
Before moving into features, Baiz wrote and directed several short films, music videos and a documentary, including A Short Statement About War and Billions Served (1997), Mass Production (1998), the music video Yo no quiero (2000), the short film La sesión (2001), the music video Homenaje (2002), the documentary Penumbra (2004) and the music video Sin decir una palabra (2006). His short film Hoguera ("Bonfire") was selected for the Directors' Fortnight at the 2007 Cannes Film Festival.

=== Career ===
Satanás, Baiz's feature debut, premiered in June 2007 and starred Mexican actor Damián Alcázar. It was based on the novel by Mario Mendoza, which was itself inspired by real events at the El Pozzetto restaurant in Bogotá, where on 4 December 1986 Vietnam War veteran Campo Elías Delgado killed several people after having already murdered his mother. The film won the awards for best film and best actor at the Monte Carlo Film Festival and was invited to screen at the San Sebastián International Film Festival. The film received a mix of favourable and unfavourable reviews in Colombia.

His second feature film, The Hidden Face is based on a screenplay written by Hatem Khraiche Ruiz-Zorrilla. The film starred Colombian actress Martina García alongside Spanish actors Quim Gutiérrez and Clara Lago.

His third film, Roa, was filmed in Bogotá and centers on Juan Roa Sierra, the man considered to have assassinated Liberal Party leader Jorge Eliécer Gaitán. The film was released on 9 April 2013 to coincide with the anniversary of Gaitán's assassination.

=== Television ===
Since the early 2010s Baiz has worked extensively in television, directing episodes of El cartel (2010) and Infiltrados (2011) before taking a larger role on Metástasis (2014) and serving as director and executive producer on Narcos (2015–2017) and Narcos: Mexico (2018). He later directed episodes of The Sandman (2022) and served as director and executive producer of the miniseries Griselda (2024).

== Filmography ==
Short film

Year	Title	Director	Writer	Producer	Editor
2000	Payaso Hijueputa	Yes	Yes	Yes	Yes
2007	Hoguera	Yes	Yes	Yes	Yes
2008	Passing By	Yes	No	No	Yes

Feature film

Year	Title	Director	Writer	Producer
2007	Satanás	Yes	Yes	No
2011	The Hidden Face	Yes	Yes	No
2013	Roa	Yes	Yes	No
2024	Pimpinero: Blood and Oil	Yes	Yes	Yes
TBA	Fight for '84	Yes	No	No

Television

Year	Title	Director	Executive producer	Notes
2010	El cartel	Yes	No	1 episode
2011	Infiltrados	Yes	No	Episode "El asesinato de un Coronel"
2014	Metástasis	Yes	No	8 episodes
2015–2017	Narcos	Yes	Yes	12 episodes
2018	Narcos: Mexico	Yes	Co-executive	4 episodes
2022	The Sandman	Yes	No	2 episodes
2024	Griselda	Yes	Yes	Miniseries
