= Pedro María Ramírez Ramos =

Colombian Roman Catholic priest

Blessed Pedro María Ramírez Ramos
- Church: Roman Catholic Church

Orders
- Ordination: 21 June 1930 by Pedro María Rodríguez Andrade

Personal details
- Born: Pedro María Ramírez Ramos; 23 October 1899 La Plata, Huila, Colombia
- Died: 10 April 1948 (aged 48) Armero, Tolima, Colombia
- Parents: Ramón Ramírez Flórez & Isabel Ramos
- Education: Mary Immaculate Seminary, Ibagué, Colombia

Sainthood
- Feast day: 10 April
- Venerated in: Roman Catholic Church (Colombia)
- Title as Saint: Priest & martyr
- Beatified: 8 September 2017; Villavicencio, Colombia by Pope Francis
- Attributes: Priest's cassock

Pedro María Ramírez Ramos (23 October 1899 – 10 April 1948) was a Colombian Roman Catholic priest killed during the outbreak of the Colombian civil war known as La Violencia. He served as the pastor of Armero, where he was stationed until his murder in 1948. The outbreak of the conflict saw families offer to smuggle him out of the town for his safety, which he refused, saying that he would not abandon his people in their hour of need. But liberal insurgents – who saw him as an instigator of the assassination of a leading national politician – burst into his church and took him to the central square where he was lynched and mutilated.

The cause for Ramírez' canonization was opened in 1993. His beatification was approved in July 2017 by Pope Francis, who personally presided over his beatification in Villavicencio on 8 September 2017 during his apostolic visit to the nation.

== Life ==
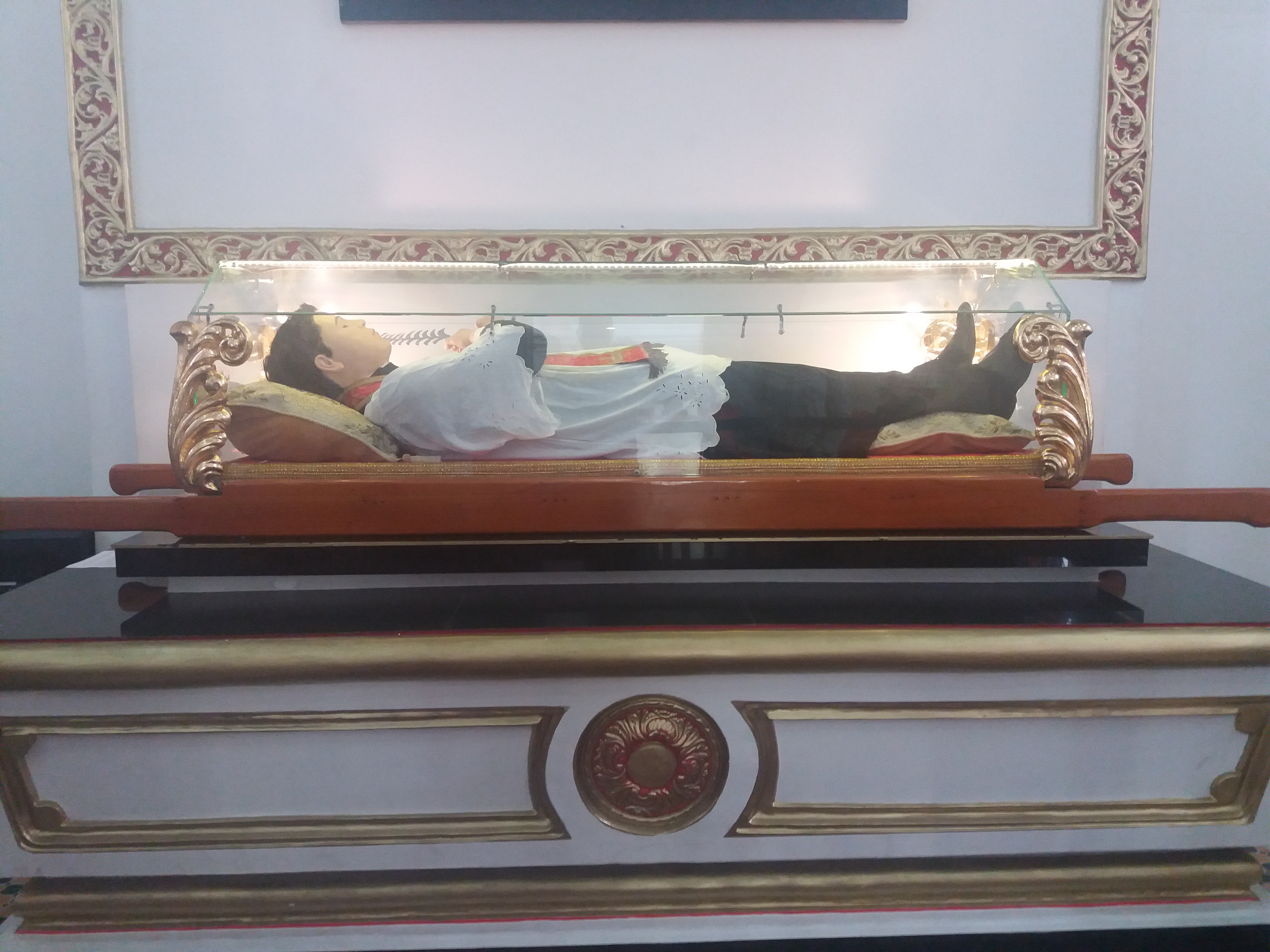
Remains housed in a glass sarcophagus.

Ramírez was born on 23 October 1899 in La Plata to Ramón Ramírez Flórez and Isabel Ramos. He was baptized the next day in the local Parish Church of St. Sebastian. It was at that church that he also made his First Communion.

Ramírez' initial education was overseen in his local village. He attended high school at the Minor Seminary of St. Aloysius Gonzaga in Elias, Huila. He commenced his formal studies for the priesthood on 4 October 1915 at the seminary of the Diocese of Garzón, where he received minor orders in 1917. Ramirez developed doubts about his vocation, however, and decided to leave the seminary in 1920, seeking an answer to his vocational calling and relief from the frequent headaches from he suffered. He spent the subsequent years working as a choir director in various locations, initially at his former high school, and from 1924 at the village of Alpujarra, Tolima. Through a close and personal relationship with a pious young woman he came to know there, by 1928 he had reassessed his call to serve God and resumed his theological studies, this time at the Seminary of Mary Immaculate of the Diocese of Ibagué, for which he was ordained as a priest on 21 June 1930. He celebrated his First Mass at his home parish in St. Sebastian Church on the following 16 July.

After Ramírez' ordination, his superior, Pedro María Rodríguez Andrade, the Bishop of Ibagué, appointed him as the pastor of Chaparral before transferring him to Cunday in 1934 and later to El Fresno in 1943. He was sent to his final parish of Armero circa 1948.

On 9 April 1948, Ramírez was visiting a patient in the local hospital when the news broke of the assassination of the presidential candidate of the Colombian Liberal Party, Jorge Eliécer Gaitán. Ramírez was under the threat of death himself by that afternoon as members of the Liberal Party believed he had instigated the murder. A Sister Miguelina of the Mercedarian Sisters of the Blessed Sacrament who taught at the local school tried to help him and this bought him some time. Some families offered to help him flee during the night so he could remain safe, though the priest refused the offers, refusing to abandon his people during their time of need.

During the afternoon on 10 April 1948 a large throng of people broke into the church not long after Ramírez had written his last will, believing that his final hour was at hand. Insurgents burst into the church and convent, accusing him of hiding weapons for the conservatives. His attackers took him to the central square (hurling insults at him en route) where he was lynched at 4:00pm and struck with a machete. His remains were left in the square for a few hours until midnight when his corpse was taken to the local cemetery where it was left in a ditch while refusing the faithful from going near his remains for burial. On 21 April government officials arrived and authorized an autopsy. A month later his parents were able to claim his remains, which they first had taken to his alma mater, Mary Immaculate Seminary in Ibagué, after which they were buried in the family plot in La Plata.

== Veneration ==
The cause for the canonization was opened in the Diocese of Garzón whereby the bishop of the diocese charged a diocesan tribunal with the collection of documents and testimonies related to Ramírez' life and his murder. The conclusion of this diocesan process saw the diocese send all documents to the Congregation for the Causes of Saints of the Holy See, which accepted the cause for further study on 23 February 1993, which accorded Ramírez the title of Servant of God.

The congregation validated this process under Pope John Paul II on 1 March 2002, after assessing the documents and approving the investigation's work and issued an official "nihil obstat" ("Let nothing stand against [it]") to the cause. Historians were assigned to discuss the cause and cleared it on 11 December 2012, after deeming that no historical obstacles existed that would impede it. The congregation then submitted the positio for theological assessment. The theological experts approved the dossier on 28 May 2016, as did the congregation sometime in mid-2017.

On 7 July 2017, Pope Francis approved the work of the congregation with its declaration that Ramírez had been killed "in odium fidei" (in hatred of the faith) and that he would soon be beatified along with his compatriot, Bishop Jesús Emilio Jaramillo Monsalve executed by leftist guerillas in 1950. The pope himself presided over the beatification in Villavicencio on 8 September 2017, during his apostolic visit to Colombia. Ramírez's remains were exhumed and transferred on 24 August 2017.

The current postulator for this cause is the Trinitarian friar Antonio Sáez de Albéniz, O.Ss.T.

=== Controversy ===
When the decision to beatify Ramírez was first announced, a protest against it was issued to Pope Francis by the daughter of the politician whose murder had precipitated his. In her letter to the pope, the daughter, Gloria Gaitán, questioned this step by the Catholic Church, citing how the priest had openly called for her father's death, declaring in the pulpit that to kill him would not be a sin.

== Beatification ==
Pope Francis approved the cause on 7 July 2017 and thus approved the late priest's beatification. Francis himself presided over the beatification during his papal visit to Colombia at an open-air Mass on 8 September 2017 at Catama Field in Villavicencio.
