= March of Silence (Colombia) =

1948 peaceful political demonstration in Bogotá, Colombia

- A crowd gathering during the march of silence in Bogota
- Native name: Marcha del Silencio
- Date: 7 February 1948
- Location: Plaza de Bolívar, Bogotá, Colombia
- Type: Political demonstration
- Organized by: Jorge Eliécer Gaitán
- Participants: Gaitán supporters and other civilians

The March of Silence (Spanish: Marcha del Silencio) was a political demonstration held on 7 February 1948 in Bogotá, Colombia, organized by Liberal politician Jorge Eliécer Gaitán. Thousands of people gathered in Plaza de Bolívar to protest the growing political violence affecting the country, particularly attacks against Liberal supporters.

The demonstrators marched in silence while carrying black flags as symbols of mourning for victims of political violence. The demonstration was intended to express opposition to violence and demand government protection for civilians.

At the Plaza de Bolívar, Gaitán delivered his speech known as the Oración por la Paz (Prayer for Peace), addressing Conservative president Mariano Ospina Pérez. He called for an end to political persecution and urged the government to protect human life and allow political disputes to proceed through constitutional means.

The demonstration took place approximately two months before Gaitán's assassination on 9 April 1948, which triggered the Bogotazo and intensified the period of political violence known as La Violencia. The March of Silence subsequently became an important event in Colombia's political and historical memory.

== See also ==
- Jorge Eliécer Gaitán
- La Violencia
- Bogotazo
- Colombian Liberal Party
