= Galvis =

Galvis is a surname. Notable people with the surname include:

- Alejandro Galvis Galvis (1891–1981), Colombian publisher and politician
- Freddy Galvis (born 1989), Venezuelan baseball player
- Nicolás Galvis (born 1997), Colombian footballer
