= Gloria Gaitán =

Colombian writer, diplomat, and politician

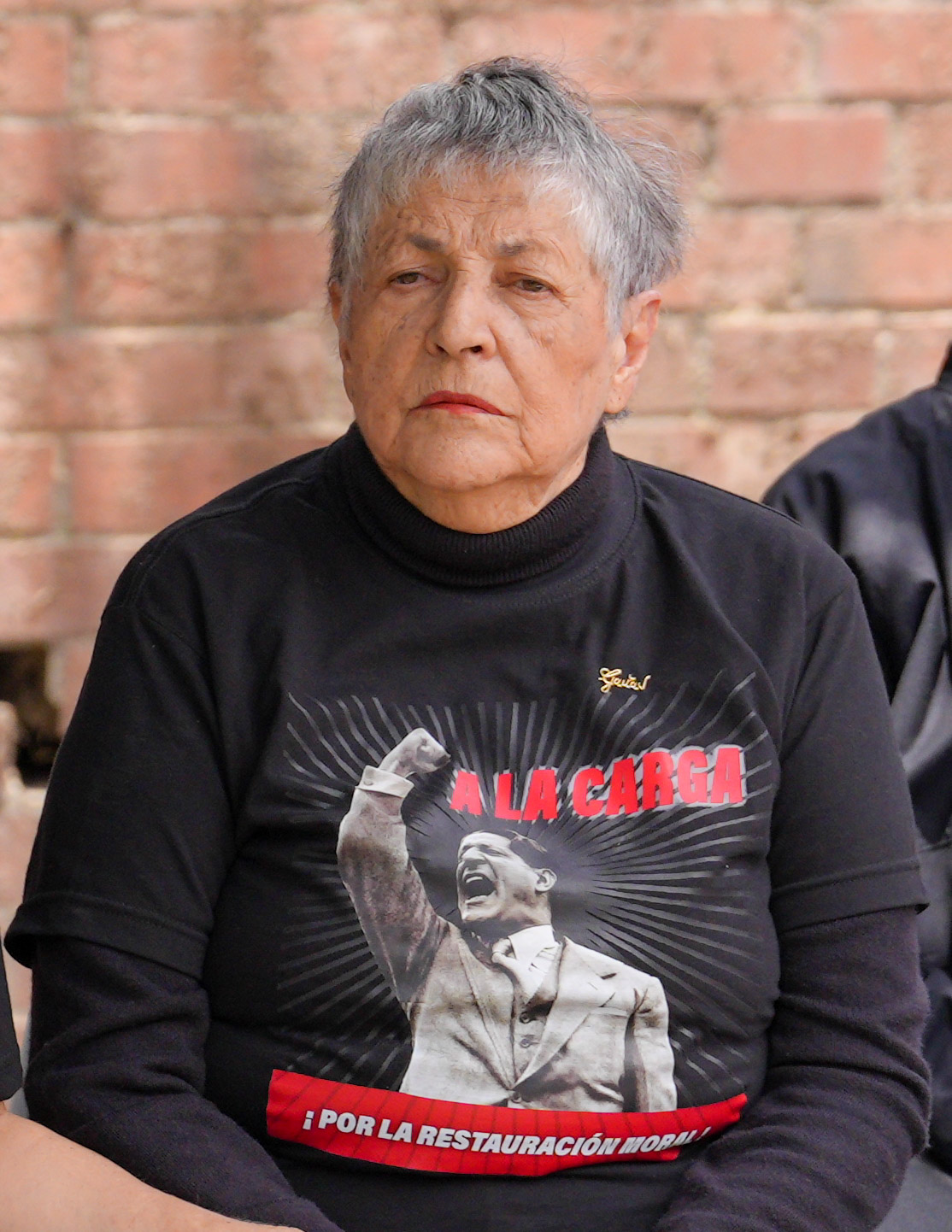

Ambassador of Colombia to Romania
- In office 1982

Member of the Chamber of Representatives
- In office 7 August 1970 – 7 August 1974
- Constituency: Risaralda

Personal details
- Born: Gloria Amparo de las Mercedes Gaitán Jaramillo; 20 September 1937 (age 89) Bogotá, D.C., Colombia
- Party: Liberal
- Spouse: Luis Emiro Valencia (m. 1958; div. 1971)
- Domestic partner: Salvador Allende (1973)
- Parents: Jorge Eliécer Gaitán (father); Amparo Jaramillo (mother)
- Education: University of Los Andes
- Occupation: Writer, diplomat, politician

Gloria Amparo de las Mercedes Gaitán Jaramillo (born 20 September 1937) is a Colombian writer, diplomat, and politician. She was a member of the Chamber of Representatives from 1970 to 1974, and served as Colombia's ambassador to Romania in 1982.

== Biography ==
Gloria Gaitán was born in Bogotá on 20 September 1937, the daughter of the Colombian Liberal Party leader Jorge Eliécer Gaitán. She was 10 years old when he was assassinated on 9 April 1948. She grew up with her mother, Amparo Jaramillo de Gaitán, who later married and settled in Switzerland. There, Gloria studied in Geneva, and later in Lausanne, returning to Colombia with her mother in 1957.

In Bogotá, she studied philosophy (in 1959) and economics (in 1968) at the University of Los Andes. She was married to the economist and Socialist Party leader Luis Emiro Valencia in 1958, with whom she had two daughters, and whom she divorced in 1971.

Gaitán served as director of the América Libre publishing house, and of the weekly magazines Batalla del Pueblo and Gaitán: yo no soy un hombre soy un pueblo during the 1960s.

She was an economic adviser to the president of Chile, Salvador Allende, from January 1973 until the day of the coup d'état by General Augusto Pinochet, when she had to take refuge in the Colombian embassy in Santiago until she managed to return home.

Gloria Gaitán maintained a romantic relationship with Allende, which she acknowledged in 2007 when she revealed that she had left Chile pregnant with a son of the Chilean president, who was never born.

Allende, who had met Gaitán in Cuba in 1959, found out in 1972 from his ambassador to Colombia, Hernán Gutiérrez Leyton, of economic difficulties she was going through after her divorce, and immediately decided to invite her to Chile, where her presence would "be a symbol".

During the 1970s, as leader of the Gaitanista Popular Movement, she was a member of the Chamber of Representatives for Risaralda Department. In 1982 she was the Colombian ambassador to Romania.

Between 1982 and 1993, she directed the Jorge Eliécer Gaitán Center, attached to the Ministry of Education, and ran for president in the 1994 election as a candidate for the Liberal Party. From 1995 to 2002 she directed the new Jorge Eliécer Gaitán Colombian Participation Institute, Colparticipar. In 2003, she unsuccessfully ran for mayor of Bogotá.

From a young age, she assumed the task of studying and maintaining her father's legacy, participating in various initiatives of the international left, in addition to giving her support to peace processes that the governments of the day carried out with leftist guerrillas in Colombia. She has also worked as a columnist, and is the author of several books.

In 2011, the anniversary of her father's death, 9 April, was decreed by the government to be the "Day of Historical Memory and Solidarity with the Victims of the Armed Conflict". During its 2017 commemoration, while giving a speech in the Colombian Congress, Gaitán accused the former president and then senator Álvaro Uribe of persecuting her politically during his government. She claimed that he had filed 41 legal proceedings against her, as a way of silencing her for blaming the CIA for Operation Pantomime, executed against her father, and for denouncing the black operations carried out by the US intelligence agency during the development of Plan Colombia while Uribe was in office.

== Publications ==
- Guatimbol: formación y desintegración de un latifundio cafetero [Guatimbol: Formation and Disintegration of a Coffee Estate] (in Spanish). University of Los Andes. 1969.
- El compañero presidente [The Comrade President] (in Spanish). Alfonso Rentería Mantilla. 1974.
- Colombia, la lucha por la tierra en la década del treinta: génesis de la organización sindical campesina [Colombia, the Struggle for Land in the Thirties: Genesis of the Peasant Union Organization] (in Spanish). Bogotá: Ediciones Tercer Mundo. 1976. Republished in 1984 by Ancora Editores as La lucha por la tierra en la década del treinta: génesis de la organización sindical campesina [The Struggle for Land in the Thirties: Genesis of the Peasant Union Organization].
- Arquitectura liberal [Liberal Architecture] (in Spanish). ARCO. 1990.
- Bolívar tuvo un caballo blanco, mi papá un Buick [Bolívar Had a White Horse; My Dad Had a Buick] (in Spanish). Graficsa. 1998.
