= Roa (film) =

- Original poster for Roa
- Directed by: Andrés Baiz
- Written by: Andrés Baiz; Patricia Castañeda
- Starring: Mauricio Puentes; Catalina Sandino Moreno
- Cinematography: Guillermo Nieto
- Edited by: Alejandro Carrillo Penovi
- Music by: Iván Wyszogrod
- Release date: 2013
- Running time: 98 minutes
- Country: Colombia
- Language: Spanish

Roa is a Colombian feature film released in 2013. It was directed by Andrés Baiz, who also co-wrote the screenplay and starring Mauricio Puentes, Catalina Sandino Moreno, Santiago Rodríguez, Rebeca López, John Alex Toro, Carlos Manuel Vesga, Arturo Goetz, and César Bordón. It is a fictionalized account inspired by the final days in the life of Juan Roa Sierra, the man who was blamed for the 1948 assassination of Jorge Eliécer Gaitán, the charismatic liberal candidate for president. The film depicts Roa as an inept and naive pawn who was threatened and manipulated by powerful, shadowy figures into becoming the scapegoat for the assassination. It premiered as the opening film at the 53rd Cartagena International Film Festival in 2013.

The film received mixed reviews. In 2013, the film won six Macondo Awards—presented by the Colombian Academy of Cinematographic Arts and Sciences—including the award for Best Lead Actor.

== Plot ==
Roa is unemployed and struggling to support his wife and daughter. His brother tries to teach him to drive a taxi, but Roa ends up causing an accident.

At the movie theater, Roa and his family watch a newsreel in which Roa is shown at a rally standing behind Gaitán. Roa has a brief encounter with Gaitán, who gives Roa a business card. Roa becomes obsessed with Gaitán and follows him, watching through a window as Gaitan eats dinner with his family, asking questions of people outside Gaitán's law office, and imitating Gaitan's speeches in the streets. Roa dresses in his best suit of clothes and receives a blessing from his mother before going to Gaitan's office where he asks for help. Gaitán says he is not able to help and turns Roa away.

Roa has a disagreement with his wife and moves in with his mother. He continues following Gaitán and attending a rally and other events. He is now disenchanted with the man of the people. He encounters a group of men who are anti-communists and are concerned that Gaitán will be elected president.

Roa's mother encourages him to search for work. He gets a painting job at the house next to Gaitán's house. After work, he watches Gaitán at night through a window of his house. A black car approaches, and the driver grabs Roa and throws him into the back of a car with another man. The man points a gun at Roa and demands to know who he is working for and why he is following Gaitán. They leave him by the side of the road. Roa then gets a job putting up advertising posters in the streets of Bogotá.

Roa is visited by the men in the black car on multiple occasions. They give him a gun to shoot Gaitan. They say they will be watching him, threaten his family, and warn him not to go to the police. The man from the black car shows up at the house of Roa's mother. They teach him how to shoot the gun with accuracy. They tell him he needs "cajones" to do what he needs to do.

Roa reconciles with his wife in the days before he is to shoot Gaitán.

On the day of the assassination, the man in the black car gives another gun to Roa and tells him to shoot Gaitán in the head. Roa waits outside Gaitán's office as other conspirators watch. Roa has second thoughts and considers shooting himself. The man in the black car gives Roa money to encourage him to go through with the shooting. In the film, Roa does not shoot Gaitán. One of the conspirators shoots Gaitan. The conspirators then place the gun in Roa's hand and point him out to the police as the shooter. Roa is arrested, but an enraged mob seizes Roa, beats him to death, and drags his body through the streets.

The assassination sets off a wave of violence and rioting that became known as the Bogotazo. In the final scene, Roa's naked and bloody body lies in the street as the rioting leaves parts of Bogotá in ruins.

== Production ==
The film was directed by Andrés Baiz with a screenplay by Baiz and Patricia Castañeda. Other key production credits include:

- Cinematography - Guillermo Nieto
- Production design - Diana Trujillo
- Costume design - Camila Olarte
- Editing - Alejandro Carrillo Penovi
- Sound design - Martín Grignaschi
- Music - Iván Wyszogrod

== Cast ==
- Mauricio Puentes, as Juan Roa Sierra
- Catalina Sandino Moreno, as Roa's wife María
- Santiago Rodriguez, as Jorge Eliécer Gaitán
- Rebeca López, as Doña Encarnación

== Reception ==
Roa was first shown at the Cartagena International Film Festival in February 2013. Ed Buckley of Bogota's The City Paper praised the "impressive debut" of director Baiz and the performance of Puentes as "a powerful and conflicted depiction of Roa in his first feature role."

In a review in Semana, Manuel Kalmanovitz G. criticized the filmmaker for ignoring the guilt of the central character and instead depicting him as "a poor devil, a weakling who, whatever he has done, is not to blame for anything." Kalmanovitz also criticized the film's contradictory depiction of Roa as, on the one hand, a pitiful soul, and on the other hand, a man consumed with thoughts of greatness. He concluded that the film was "perverse moral handwashing" promoting the notion that "nobody is to blame for anything."

In El Heraldo, Rafael Pabón praised the film as operatic in its presentation: "Roa is a film that unfolds with ease and keeps the audience in a constant state of tension. Baiz creates an entire opera around one of the most significant events in the history of our country. A broad adagio that culminates with a frenetic presto: Gaitán's death, the big mouth, the frustration of a people and confusion. If there is something to praise in the film, it is its ending, sublime."

In El Colombiano, Oswaldo Osorio criticized the film for "doubtful credibility and lack of unity in the different tones in which [the episodes] are presented". While he found the staging and cinematography to be strong, he was troubled by the questionable accuracy of the depiction. Osorio also criticized the film's lack of "emotional coherence" and its inconsistent depiction of Roa as either "a fanatic or a poor wuss." Mauricio Laurens of the newspaper El Tiempo gave it a favorable review, describing the director as "a virtuoso director with auteur aspirations, who elicits nuanced, temperamental performances from his actors and surprises the viewer with dramatic twists."
