= Picacho Mountain (Colombia) =

Mountain in Santander department, Colombia

Coordinates: 7.10801°N 72.97146°W

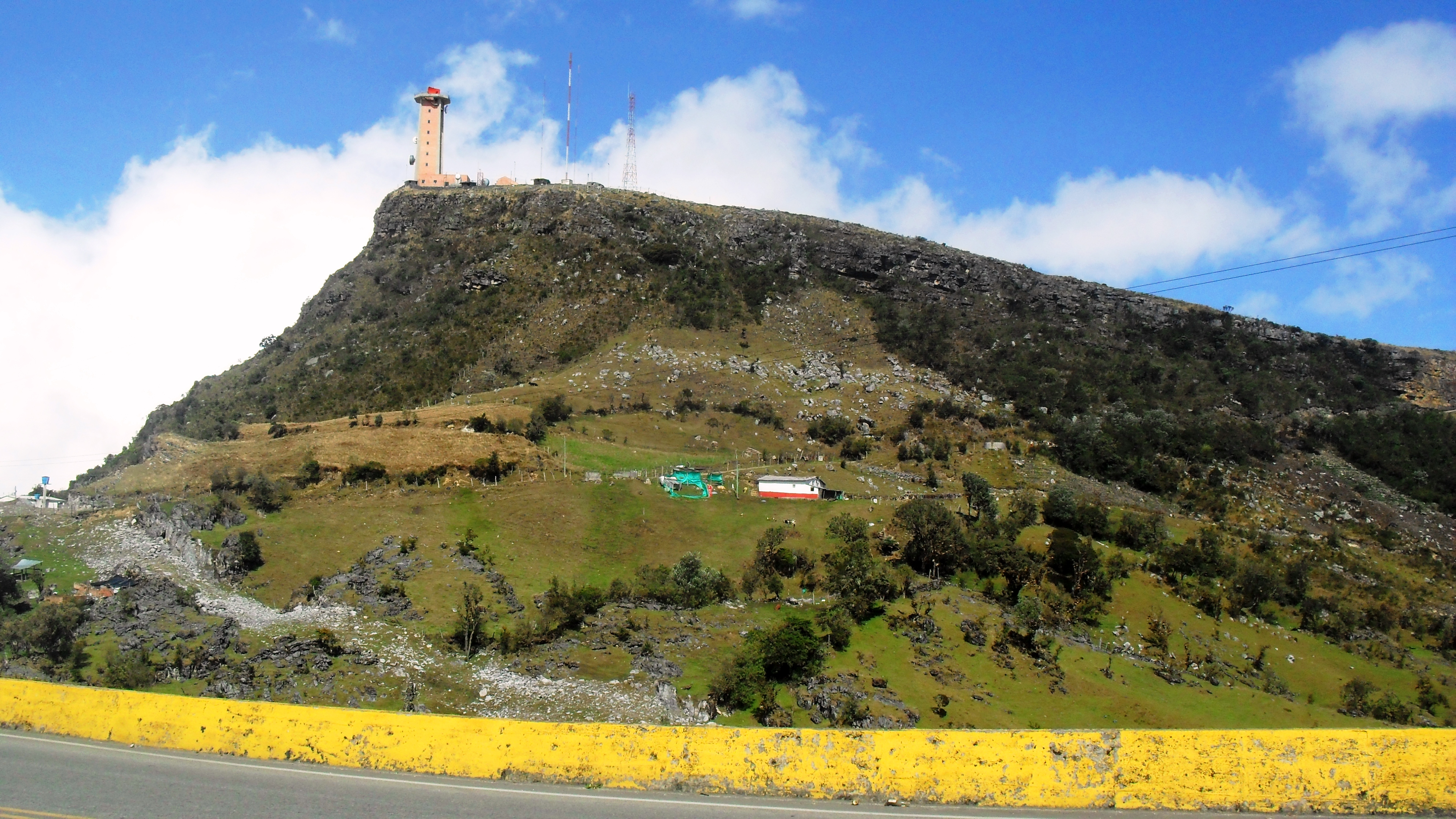
El Picacho in 2013

El Picacho is a mountain c. 20 kilometres (12 mi) due east of Bucaramanga, Santander department, Colombia. The toll booth near the summit, on Colombia Route 66, is at an altitude of 3,400 metres (11,200 ft). The local newspaper Vanguardia organises an annual cycling race, the Picacho Challenge, from Bucaramanga to the summit. In 2026, the Colombian Civil Aviation Authority installed a new radar system on the peak to improve the air traffic control capacity within Santander.
