= List of governors of Santander =

The governor of the Department Santander heads the executive branch of the government of the Colombian department of Santander. The governor is the highest-ranking official in the department, serving as the main agent for the president of Colombia to carry on the task of maintaining public order and the execution of the general economic policy, and all matters of law passed down for the nation. The current governor is Horacio Serpa Uribe.

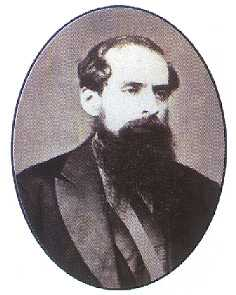
Eustorgio Salgar, three times President of the State of Santander and deputy for the States of Tolima, Santander, Cundinamarca. President of the Sovereign State of Cundinamarca (1874–1876). President of the United States of Colombia (1870–1872).

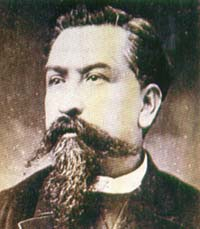
General Solón Wilches, twice president of the State of Santander, and presidential candidate in 1870 and 1872.

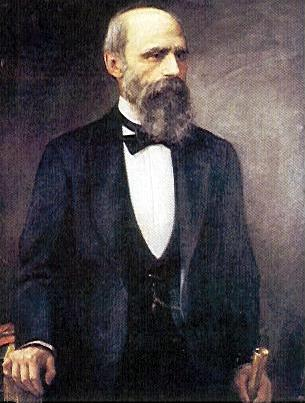
Aquileo Parra Gómez President of Santander, and President of the United States of Colombia (1876–1878).

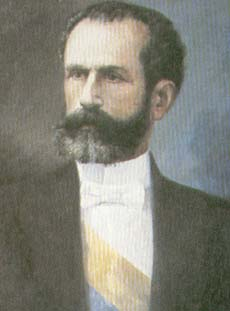
Ramón González Valencia Governor of the Department of Santander, and Vice-president of Colombia in 1904.

== Presidents of the Sovereign State of Santander ==
The Sovereign State of Santander was created on May 13, 1857 as the third Sovereign State of the Republic of New Granada. The state would be an independent entity within the country ruled by a president which would be elected by the State Congress. The president of the state would act as the governor of the region but with more power and independence from the central government, in turn, the title of governor was given to the heads of government of the provinces of the state.

Many presidents of the state, due to the great amount of power they held, and the political importance of the region, went on to become Presidents of the Nation, and others went on to become important political figures in Congress or other areas.

On April 8, 1859, Congress passed a law giving the president of the country, then the Granadine Confederation, the right to remove the duly appointed governors of the states and appoint one of his choosing. With this law, the president secured the power of the Conservative Party. This changed the practice of a state-elected executive representative; instead the president of Colombia would appoint the president or governor of the state or department; this went on till 1991.

Tenure		Incumbent president
Took office	Left office	Incumbent president
October 16, 1857	October 23, 1857	Estanislao Silva Calderón
October 23, 1857	1858	Manuel Murillo Toro
1858	1858	Ulpiano Valenzuela
1858	1858	Vicente Herrera
1859	1859	Manuel Murillo Toro
March 12, 1859	March 18, 1859	Vicente Herrera
March 18, 1859	March 21, 1859	Luis Flórez
March 21, 1859	April 3, 1859	Evaristo Azuero
April 3, 1859	November 23, 1859	Eustorgio Salgar
November 23, 1859	January 1, 1860	Ulpiano Valenzuela
January 1, 1860	February 1, 1860	Antonio María Pradilla Rueda
February 1, 1860	February 29, 1860	José María Villamizar Gallardo
February 29, 1860	May 6, 1860	Marco Antonio Estrada
May 6, 1860	August 16, 1860	Antonio María Pradilla Rueda
August 16, 1860	September 8, 1860	Federal Intervention, State government suspended
September 8, 1860	1861	Marco Antonio Estrada
1861	1862	Leonardo Canal González
1862	1862	Adolfo Harker Mutis
1862	1863	Eustorgio Salgar
1863	1864	Pedro Quintero Jácome
1864	June 6, 1864	Eustorgio Salgar
June 7, 1864	October 11, 1864	Rafael Otero Navarro
October 11, 1864	October 1, 1866	José María Villamizar Gallardo
October 1, 1866	September 24, 1868	Victoriano de Diego y Paredes
September 24, 1868	October 1, 1868	Narciso Cadena Uribe
October 1, 1868	March 14, 1870	Eustorgio Salgar
March 14, 1870	March 30, 1870	Narciso Cadena Uribe
March 30, 1870	October 1, 1872	Solón Wilches
October 1, 1872	September 15, 1874	Narciso Cadena Uribe
September 15, 1874	May 16, 1875	Germán Vargas Santos
May 16, 1875	May 25, 1876	Aquileo Parra Gómez
May 25, 1876	1876	Francisco Muñoz
1876	1877	Marco Antonio Estrada
1877	1877	Francisco Muñoz
1877	1877	Marco Antonio Estrada
1877	1877	Domingo Castro
1877	1877	Francisco Muñoz
1877	1877	Domingo Castro
1877	October 1, 1878	Marco Antonio Estrada
October 1, 1878	1883	Solón Wilches
1883	1883	Vicente Villamizar
October 1, 1883	September 9, 1884	Solón Wilches
September 9, 1884	1885	Narciso González Lineros
1885	August 5, 1886	Antonio Roldán
1886	1886	Alejandro Peña Solano

== Governors of the Department of Santander ==
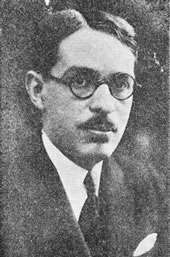
Governor Eduardo Santos Montejo

In 1886 the states were abolished and Santander became a Department under direct authority of the central government.

In 1910 the northern part of the department was detached to form the new Department of Norte de Santander separately represented by their own Governor.

Tenure		Incumbent governor
Took office	Left office	Incumbent governor
1886	1887	Alejandro Peña Solano
1887	1888	Antonio Roldán
1888	1888	Vicente Villamizar
1888	1889	Guillermo Quintero
1889	1890	Aurelio Mutis
1890	1895	Guillermo Quintero
1895	1896	José Santos
1896	1886	Antonio Roldán
1186	1897	Roso Cala
1897	1898	Aurelio Mutis
1898	1899	Roso Cala
1899	1900	Alejandro Peña Solano
1900	1900	Carlos J. Delgado
1900	1901	Ramón González Valencia
1901	1901	Carlos Matamoros
1901	1902	Juan Francisco Mantilla
1902	1903	Antonio Barrera Forero
1903	1904	Ramón González Valencia
1904	1904	Carlos Matamoros
1904	1904	Jesús Cuervo Márquez
1904	1905	Alejandro Peña Solano
1905	1906	Santiago Rizo
1906	1907	Alejandro Peña Solano
1907	1908	Gabino Navas
1908	1909	Alejandro Peña Solano
1909	1911	Eugenio Andrade Suescún
1911	1913	Antonio Barrera Forero
1913	1916	Manuel María Valdivieso Valencia
1916	1917	Ernesto Valderrama
1918	1921	Luis Mejía
1921	1823	José María García
1923	December 1924	Emilio Pradilla González
December 1924	December 19, 1926	Arturo Mantilla
December 19, 1926	1928	Juan de la Cruz Duarte
1928	1929	Narciso Torres Meléndez
November 26, 1929	September 4, 1930	Alfredo García Cadena
1930	1931	Alejandro Galvis Galvis
1931	1932	Eduardo Santos Montejo
1932	1933	Alfredo Cadena D'Costa
1933	1934	Humberto Gómez Naranjo
1934	1935	Pedro Alejandro Gómez
1935	1937	Rogerio Silva Pradilla
1937	1939	Alfredo Cadena D'Costa
1939	1941	Hernán Gómez Gómez
1941	1943	Benjamín García Cadena
1943	1944	Arturo Santos
April 21, 1944	February 15, 1945	Alejandro Galvis Galvis
February 15, 1945	1946	Luis Camacho Rueda
1946	1947	Samuel Arango Reyes
1947	1947	Julio Martín Acevedo Díaz
1948	1948	Rafael Ortíz González
1948	1948	Miguel Ángel Hoyos
1949	1949	Valentín González Rangel
1950	1950	Hernando Sorzano González
1951	1951	Guillermo Garavito Durán
1952	1953	Pedro Nel Rueda Uribe
1953	1953	Néstor Meza Prieto
1953	1953	José Amaya
1954	1957	Quintín Gustavo Gómez
1958	1958	Ernesto Caicedo López
1958	1958	Alberto Lozano Cleves
1959	1960	Samuel Arango Reyes
1960	1961	Mario Latorre Rueda
1962	1962	Gustavo Serrano Gómez
1963	1964	Humberto Silva Valdivieso
1965	1965	Enrique Barco Guerrero
1965	1965	Reynaldo López López
1966	1966	Francisco José Calderón
1966	1968	Julio Obregón Bueno
1969	1969	Eduardo Camacho Gamba
1970	1970	Alfonso Gómez Gómez
1971	1971	Jaime Serrano Rueda
1972	1973	Jaime Trillos Novoa
1974	1974	Rafael Pérez Martínez
1975	1975	Oscar Edmundo Martínez
1976	1976	Rafael Ortiz González
1977	1978	Alberto Montoya Puyana
1979	1981	Alfonso Gómez Gómez
1982	1982	Luis Ardila Casamitjana
1983	1983	Rafael Moreno Peñaranda
1984	1984	Jorge Agustín Sedano
1985	1986	Álvaro Cala Hederich
1987	1988	Alvaro Betrán Pinzón
1989	1990	Eduardo Camacho Barco
1990	1990	Hernando Reyes Duarte
1991	December 31, 1991	Clara Elsa Villalba de Sandoval

== Democratically elected governors ==
The Colombian Constitution of 1991 allowed for local democratic elections to take place electing governors for each department and the elections being held at the same time to avoid confusion.

Tenure		Incumbent governor
Took office	Left office	Incumbent governor
January 1, 1992	December 31, 1994	Juan Carlos Duarte Torres
January 1, 1995	December 31, 1997	Mario Camacho Prada
January 1, 1998	December 31, 2000	Miguel Jesús Arenas Prada
January 1, 2001	December 31, 2003	Jorge Eliécer Gómez Villamizar
January 1, 2004	December 31, 2007	Hugo Heliodoro Aguilar Naranjo
January 1, 2008	December 31, 2011	Horacio Serpa Uribe

== See also ==
- List of governors of Norte de Santander Department
- List of presidents of Colombia
