= Curití =

Coordinates: 6°40′N 73°00′W

Curiti
- Municipality and town
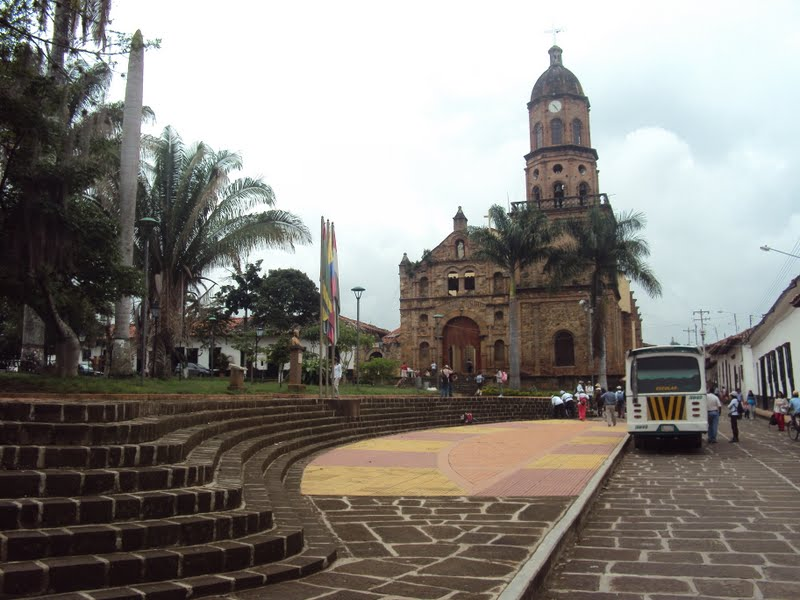

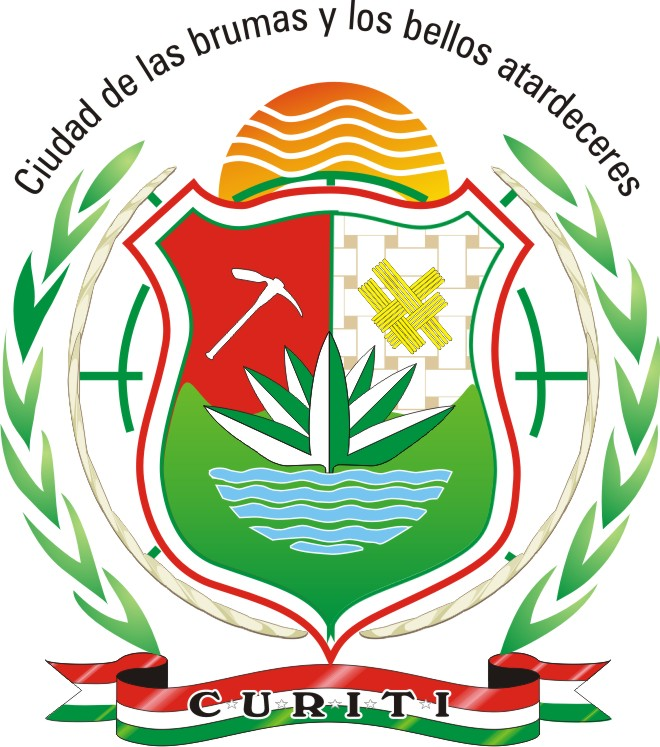
- Flag Coat of arms

- Location of the municipality and town of Curiti in the Santander Department of Colombia.
- Country: Colombia
- Department: Santander Department

Area
  - Total: 238 km^{2} (92 sq mi)

Population (Census 2018)
  - Total: 11,653
  - Density: 49.0/km^{2} (127/sq mi)
- Time zone: UTC-5 (Colombia Standard Time)

Curiti is a town and municipality in the Santander Department in North-Eastern Colombia. The area is famous for crafts made from fique, or agave sisal.

Curiti is the birthplace of Alejandro Galvis Galvis, a renowned politician and publisher.

== Notable ==
- Fabián Ríos (born 1980), telenovela popular actor
