= Jorge Eliecer Gaitan Museum =

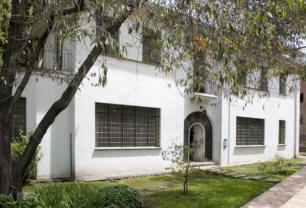
- Established: 17 April 1948
- Location: Bogotá, Colombia
- Coordinates: 4.6306°N 74.0697°W
- Director: Universidad Nacional de Colombia
- Website: www.museos.unal.edu.co

The Jorge Eliecer Gaitan Museum (aka Casa Museo Jorge Eliecer Gaitan) is a museum in Bogotá, Colombia, dedicated to the life of assassinated politician Jorge Eliecer Gaitan.

== History ==
The house Jorge Eliécer Gaitán Ayala lived in from the beginning of the 1930s until the day of his murder on April 9, 1948, is located on Calle 42 No. 15 (42nd Street # 15), 52 of the Santa Teresita neighborhood in Bogotá. It was also part of the design planned in 1928 for this area by the "Davila Holguin & Lievano" firm. It was declared as a National Monument by Decree 1265 in 1948, and has been managed by the Universidad Nacional de Colombia since the year 2005

== Exhibitions ==
This two-story museum has an area of 218 square meters. Each space gives information on how life was in a 1930s home located in one of Bogotá's most developed neighborhoods. Each of the objects that belong to its collection tell the story of he who was called "The People's Tribune" (Tribuno del pueblo), due to his everlasting struggle to help the poor classes within the Colombian society. From this museum, it is possible to approach the country's main historical events during the mid-Twentieth Century. Each visitor can interact with the tour guides by asking questions and sharing information, as is the case of those who go to know this leader in person.

== Collections ==
The museum has Jorge Eliécer Gaitán Ayala's personal library, including more than three thousand books in different languages. During the tour, visitors can learn about his political and social contributions, as well as daily life as is shown by his personal objects. Another part of the museum is the Jorge Eliécer Gaitán Complex, including the garden where this leader's body was "planted". There, standing, and looking towards the Quinta de San Pedro Alejandrino in Santa Marta, with soil from every Colombian town, and having been showered with water from the Atlantic and Pacific Oceans and the Magdalena River, the body rests since 1988, after having been buried within the house for 40 years.

== Visitors ==
The visitors study give information on the opinions and interests of the Jorge Eliécer Gaitán House Museum, in relation to different activities held and future expectations. This study has been carried out since 2006 and is shared by the Claustro San Agustín. An important fact is that most visitors are between 11 and 25 years old, especially school and college students from different parts of the country. For visitors 70 years and above, the museum is a place where they can once again encounter the past, sharing experiences and memories with younger people.
