= Eduardo Santos Montejo =

President of Colombia from 1938 to 1942

His Excellency Eduardo Santos Montejo
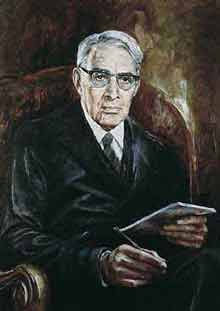

17th President of Colombia
- In office 7 August 1938 – 7 August 1942
- Preceded by: Alfonso Lopez Pumarejo
- Succeeded by: Alfonso Lopez Pumarejo

Presidential Designate
- In office 29 November 1946 – 30 October 1951
- President: Mariano Ospina Pérez (1946–1950); Laureano Gómez (1950–1951)
- Preceded by: Carlos Arango Vélez
- Succeeded by: Roberto Urdaneta

Governor of Santander
- In office 2 May 1931 – 26 May 1931
- Preceded by: Alejandro Galvis Galvis
- Succeeded by: Alejandro Cadena D'Costa

Minister of Foreign Affairs
- In office 7 August 1930 – 13 December 1930
- Preceded by: Francisco Samper Madrid
- Succeeded by: Raimundo Rivas

Personal details
- Born: August 28, 1888 Bogotá, Cundinamarca, Colombia
- Died: March 27, 1974 (aged 85) Bogotá, D.C., Colombia
- Party: Liberal
- Spouse: Lorenza Villegas Restrepo (m. 1917)
- Children: 1
- Education: Universidad Nacional de Colombia; Our Lady of the Rosary University; University of Paris
- Occupation: Journalist, politician

Eduardo Santos Montejo (August 28, 1888 – March 27, 1974) was a Colombian publisher and politician who was President of Colombia from 1938 to 1942.

He was active in the Colombian Liberal Party. He purchased the prominent Bogotá newspaper El Tiempo in 1913; El Tiempo was founded by his brother-in-law Alfonso Villegas Restrepo in 1911. Members of the Santos family were the main shareholders of the paper until 2007.

He served as the President of Colombia from August 1938 to August 1942, having been elected without opposition. During his presidency, a number of reforms were carried out in areas such as working conditions and housing.

He was born and died in Bogotá, and was the great-uncle of the 32nd president of Colombia, Juan Manuel Santos (2010–2018), and former Colombian Vice President Francisco Santos Calderon (2002–2010).
