= Lorenza Villegas de Santos =

First Lady of Colombia (1938-1942)

First Lady of Colombia
- In role 7 August 1938 – 7 August 1942
- President: Eduardo Santos Montejo
- Preceded by: María Michelsen de López
- Succeeded by: María Michelsen de López

Personal details
- Born: Ana Lorenza Villegas Restrepo; 5 October 1899 Santa Rosa de Cabal, Risaralda, Colombia
- Died: 25 March 1960 (aged 60) New York City, New York, U.S.
- Party: Liberal
- Spouse: Eduardo Santos Montejo (m. 1917; died 1960)
- Children: Clara Santos Villegas

Ana Lorenza Villegas de Santos (née Villegas Restrepo; 5 October 1899 – 25 March 1960) was the wife of the 15th President, Eduardo Santos Montejo, and served as First Lady of Colombia from 1938 to 1942.

== Personal life ==
Ana Lorenza Villegas Restrepo born 5 October 1899 in Santa Rosa de Cabal, at that time Caldas, currently Risaralda to José Antonio Villegas y Villegas and Carlota Restrepo Botero. On 25 November 1917 she married Eduardo Santos Montejo, whom she had met through her brother, Alfonso Villegas, founder and owner of El Tiempo who sold the newspaper to Santos in 1913. Together they had one daughter, Clara, who died of scarlet fever at the age of three. Lorenza died on 25 March 1960 in New York City.

Honorary titles
Preceded by María Michelsen de López	First Lady of Colombia; 1938-1942	Succeeded by María Michelsen de López
