= 1938 Colombian presidential election =

Presidential elections were held in Colombia on 1 May 1938. Eduardo Santos of the Liberal Party was the only candidate after the Conservative Party decided not to contest the elections, and received 100% of the vote. Voter turnout was only 30.2%. Santos took office on 7 August.

== Results ==
Candidate	Party	Votes	%
Eduardo Santos	Colombian Liberal Party	511,947	100.00
Total		511,947	100.00
Valid votes		511,947	99.69
Invalid/blank votes		1,573	0.31
Total votes		513,520	100.00
Registered voters/turnout		1,700,171	30.20
Source: Nohlen
