= 1935 Colombian parliamentary election =

- 26 May 1935

Congressional elections were held in Colombia on 26 May 1935 to elect the Chamber of Representatives. The Liberal Party received the most votes.

== Results ==
=== Chamber of Representatives ===
Party	Votes	%
Colombian Liberal Party	420,547	97.64
Other parties	10,181	2.36
Total	430,728	100.00
Registered voters/turnout	1,288,441	–
Source: Nohlen

=== Senate ===
Party	Seats
Colombian Liberal Party	56
Colombian Conservative Party	0
Total	56
Source: Abente et al.
