= Operation Pantomime =

Plan to assassinate Colombian presidential candidate in 1948

Operation Pantomime (Spanish: Operación Pantomima), according to a documentary elaborated by the Cuban Institute of Cinematographic Art and Industry, was an operation undertaken by the government of the United States with the intention of assassinating Colombian presidential candidate Jorge Eliécer Gaitán in 1948 as a way to curb communist and leftwing influence in the region.

The documentary included taped excerpts of the interrogation of a man identified as John Mepples Espirito, who is presented as a former CIA agent captured in Cuba during the 1960s.

During his interrogation, Espirito claims that the US had tried and failed at either bribing or blackmailing Gaitán. Espirito says that he then traveled to Colombia as part of a team of US agents, who eventually contacted and used Colombian Juan Roa Sierra to assassinate Gaitán on April 9, 1948.
