= Vanguardia (Colombian newspaper) =

Columbian regional newspaper

- Front page of Vanguardia Liberal, 15 December 2008.
- Type: Daily newspaper
- Format: Broadsheet
- Owner: Galvis Ramírez y Cía. S.A.
- Founder: Alejandro Galvis Galvis
- Editor-in-chief: Diana Giraldo
- Founded: 1 September 1919
- Political alignment: Centre-left
- Language: Spanish
- Headquarters: Bucaramanga, Santander, Colombia
- ISSN: 0122-7319
- OCLC number: 4813898
- Website: vanguardia.com

Logo in 2013

Logo in 2005

Vanguardia (English: Vanguard), formerly Vanguardia Liberal, is a Colombian regional newspaper, founded in September 1919 in Bucaramanga, Colombia, by Alejandro Galvis Galvis, whose descendants are its current owners.

It was formerly known as Vanguardia Liberal, until its name changed in March 2019.
