= Juan Roa Sierra =

Colombian assassin (1921–1948)

Juan Roa Sierra (November 4, 1921 – April 9, 1948) was a Colombian known for assassinating Colombian Liberal leader and presidential candidate Jorge Eliécer Gaitán on April 9, 1948. After he shot Gaitán three times, mortally wounding him, a mob chased Roa Sierra down and killed him. The assassination of Gaitan triggered El Bogotazo, riots that partially destroyed Bogota and led to La Violencia, a period of violence that lasted until approximately 1958.

A fictionalized account of his final days was presented in the 2013 feature film Roa.

== Background ==
Roa Sierra was the youngest child of Rafael Roa and Encarnación Sierra and had 13 siblings. In his book El Crimen del Siglo ("The Crime of the Century") writer and playwright Miguel Torres reports that Juan Roa Sierra was born in the neighbourhood "Egipto" (Egypt) in Bogotá, very near the humble residence where Jorge Eliécer Gaitán was born. His father was a stonemason and died from a respiratory illness, probably caused by his work.

Roa Sierra had had various jobs, primarily like his father as a stonemason. At some point he met a German astrologer named Johan Umland Gert and became a regular client. It is reported that Gert initiated Roa Sierra in Rosicrucianism, a medieval cult that adheres to the belief of reincarnation. Roa Sierra eventually confided in Gert his plans to find treasures in Facatativá and Monserrate. Before the events, eight of Roa Sierra's siblings had died and another one had been committed to a mental institution. It is alleged that Roa Sierra's mental health had also deteriorated to the point that he was convinced he was a reincarnation of Gonzalo Jiménez de Quesada and of Francisco de Paula Santander. He would even style his hair to resemble those historical figures and stare at his own image in the mirror for hours.

Torres also argues in El Crimen del Siglo that evidence shows that Roa Sierra's family were supporters of Gaitán and that Roa Sierra himself very likely was a pro-Gaitán activist in the elections of 1946, which would have been the reason the police reportedly found many campaign buttons with the face of the political leader in his house. Roa Sierra's former lover, María de Jesús Forero, with whom he had a daughter, was reported by newspaper El Tiempo as saying that he used to listen to Gaitán's conferences on the radio.

== Relationship with Gaitán ==
It is claimed that at the time of the murder Roa Sierra was unemployed, and that people described him as a lazy dreamer and extremely quiet and reserved. He was living in the neighbourhood Ricaurte with his mother, who was his sole financial support. According to the assistant of Jorge Eliécer Gaitán, Cecilia de González, Roa Sierra went several times to the office two months before the assassination, but she never gave him an appointment with the lawyer. In El Crimen del Siglo Torres describes Roa Sierra's disappointment in Gaitán after the latter refused to offer the former a job or any financial help and simply directed him to seek assistance from the government. Several accounts of the events claim that Gaitán's apparent disregard for Roa Sierra's economic hardship could have triggered the assassination, although Torres himself expresses doubts as to Roa Sierra's authorship of the crime and instead affirms that the alleged murderer was actually coerced by political and possibly foreign forces to eliminate the man who was likely to become the next president.

Roa Sierra's last visit to Gert is reported to have taken place on April 7, two days before Gaitán's assassination. Gert declared that Roa Sierra had had a dream about treasure in two indigenous towns not too far from Bogotá, and that he felt destiny was going to give him something important. Gert suggested that he not go alone, but Roa Sierra rejected this. On this same date Roa Sierra purchased the weapon and the next day he bought the ammunition. Brothers Luis Enrique and José Ignacio Rincón, workmates of Roa Sierra at the time of the events, testified it was from them that he had bought the defective murder weapon for 75 pesos after assuring them he needed it to go treasure-hunting with some foreigners.

Two witnesses said they had heard Roa Sierra say he was going to serve as bodyguard for two foreigners who were going on a trip to a desolated land. One foreigner, Rafael del Pino, a Cuban, was known to have been in contact with Roa Sierra ninety minutes before the assassination, according to police reports. Del Pino was traveling with another Cuban, of whom the police also felt "well-grounded suspicion" over this assassination and who was also observed in the immediate vicinity of the assassination. These two Cubans immediately fled to the Cuban Legation just in time to avoid arrest.

== Death ==
The day of the assassination Roa Sierra visited Gaitán's office at 9:30 AM. Gaitán had arrived a little before 8 AM even though he had been awake until late because he attended the trial of Lieutenant Jesús María Córtez Poveda, a client of his. The building security guard saw Roa Sierra with another person (later identified as César Bernal Ordóñez ) even though he solicited the interview alone.

Gaitán was assassinated minutes after 1:00 PM and later pronounced dead around 2:00 PM. Police corporal Carlos Alberto Jiménez Díaz and Sargeant Galvis González arrived at the scene as soon as the shots were heard. The news spread quickly and an enraged mob developed in short time yelling "mataron al doctor Gaitán" ("they killed Dr. Gaitán"). It was reported that Roa Sierra begged to Jiménez "no me mate, mi cabo" (don't kill me, corporal). Jiménez is also reported to have taken him hastily to a drugstore to protect him from the incensed crowd.

The angry mob grew in front of the drugstore that was sheltering Roa Sierra. Finally the situation was so menacing that the iron shutters of the drugstore were opened. Roa Sierra's body was then kicked and stabbed by the massive mob until he was "an almost shapeless corpse"; then his body was left in front of the Presidential Palace.

Gabriel García Márquez reports in his 2002 autobiography Vivir para contarla ("Living to Tell The Tale") that Encarnación Roa first found out about the murder on the radio, and that when she was dyeing her best dress in black to mourn Gaitán she heard the news that her own son had been the perpetrator, an accusation she reportedly always refused to believe.

== Other theories ==
According to a translation made by the United States embassy of an article published on April 16, 1948, by the newspaper El Tiempo , Roa was 25 years old at the time of his death. He was baptized in the church of the Egipto neighborhood in Bogotá and was the youngest of six brothers. He lived for some time in the Ricaurte Neighborhood (also in Bogota) at Calle 17-S No.16-52, and was working as a painter. Roa then began to suffer from schizophrenia and was interned in a clinic in Sibaté.

According to a Scotland Yard report dated July 20, 1948 Roa said he was one of 14 children of the same mother, and that his father had died. He said he had not married, but had had an affair with a married woman named María de Jesús Forero with whom he had had a child. Apparently the woman denied Roa's affirmations, and after a psychological chiromancy test in front of a mirror, Roa began to act as if he were the 19th-century Colombian military and political figure Francisco de Paula Santander. Apparently, Roa ended the relationship with the woman years before the assassination. Four months later his mother noticed he had become more quiet and disturbed. Scotland Yard affirmed he was the 13th of the 14 siblings. Scotland Yard also mentioned that Roa admired Gaitan but this admiration may have changed after a commentary made by the candidate.

In Vivir para contarla Gabriel García Márquez has some issues with the Scotland Yard report with the number of siblings and mentions that in the documents found in Roa's pocket, his address was given as Calle 8 No. 30-73, differing from that given in El Tiempo.

Scotland Yard's report also said that Roa had illusions of being mighty, egocentric and was usually spaced out. His behavior might have changed after getting involved with Rosicrucianism, to which he was introduced by a German named Umland Gerat eighteen months before the assassination of Gaitan. Apparently Roa's mother noticed this and went to speak to Gerat about his son's issues and told him her son believed he himself was Gonzalo Jiménez de Quesada, the founder of Bogotá. She also mentioned that Roa was at Gaitan's office applying for a job.

=== Theory that Roa did not assassinate Gaitán ===
Nathaniel Weyl documents the assassination claims then made by the Colombian General Secretary, Rafael Azula Barrera, and the President of Colombia, Mariano Ospina Pérez, that Gaitán was assassinated as part of a Cold War conspiracy led by the Soviet Union to increase its influence in the Caribbean. The violent disruption of the 1948 Inter-American Conference and the violent deaths of 1000 people were alleged also to have been part of a Cold War conspiracy by Soviet agents, allegedly including the low-level Soviet agent Fidel Castro. According to police records, Castro was suspected of personally assassinating Gaitán, because his Cuban travelling companion Rafael del Pino was seen with Juan Roa an hour and a half before the assassination. Castro had attempted to recruit Gaitán earlier to his cause, but Gaitán had repeatedly declined and was assassinated because he was too politically influential and would have countered the Cold War objectives of the Soviets in the Caribbean.

Weyl documents the claim by Ospina Pérez and others that Roa was influenced by others and perhaps did not commit any crime at all. He discusses the questions raised by Milton Bracker of The New York Times and U.S. Ambassador Willard L. Beaulac of whether Roa had acted on his own. Ambassador Beaulac then speculated that Roa was simply used to cover the identity of the real assassins. Ospina Pérez and Azula Barrera considered the evidence that the revolver Roa had carried was incapable of accurate fire, that Roa was not thought to have any firearms training, the assassination had been committed at some distance, and that no eyewitness saw Roa anywhere near the assassination, that he was first seen between two policemen. From this evidence the government of Colombia concluded that the impoverished Roa with his diminished mental capacities had been paid to stand near the event with a recently fired revolver.
