= Alejandro Galvis Galvis =

Colombian publisher and politician (1891–1981)

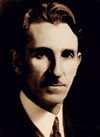

Colombia Ambassador to Spain
- In office 16 October 1969 – 14 October 1970
- President: Carlos Lleras Restrepo
- Preceded by: Guillermo León Valencia Muñóz
- Succeeded by: Carlos Augusto Noriega

Colombian Minister of War
- In office 7 August 1942 – 12 March 1943
- President: Alfonso López Pumarejo
- Preceded by: Gonzalo Restrepo Jaramillo
- Succeeded by: Ramón Santodomingo Vila

Envoy Extraordinary and Minister Plenipotentiary of Colombia to Mexico
- In office 18 August 1936 – 1938
- President: Alfonso López Pumarejo
- Preceded by: Fabio Lozano Torrijos
- Succeeded by: Office abolished

37th Governor of Santander
- In office 4 September 1930 – 1 May 1931
- President: Enrique Olaya Herrera
- Preceded by: Alfredo García Cadena
- Succeeded by: Eduardo Santos Montejo

Personal details
- Born: 12 February 1891 Curití, Santander, Colombia
- Died: 17 June 1981 (aged 90)
- Party: Liberal
- Spouse(s): Tina Baroni Montero (1938-1938); Alicia Ramírez Navas (1941-1981)
- Children: Tina Galvis Baroni; Hortensia Galvis Ramírez; Alejandro Galvis Ramírez; Silvia Galvis Ramírez; Virgilio Galvis Ramírez
- Education: Republican University of Colombia
- Profession: Lawyer

Alejandro Galvis Galvis (13 February 1891 – 17 June 1981) was a Colombian publisher and politician.

He graduated the law school of the Universidad Republicana de Bogotá. From 1914 on he worked as journalist for the newspapers Juventud Liberal and El Progreso. In 1919 he founded the newspaper Vanguardia Liberal which is the leading newspaper of the Santander region of Colombia.

Besides his interest as publisher he dedicated his work to politics. He served Colombia as president of the house of representatives, president of the senate, governor of the Department of Santander in 1931 and 1932 and as secretary of defense from 1942 to 1943. Apart from these activities he was ambassador of Colombia in Mexico, Venezuela and Spain.

== Career ==
He was designated Envoy Extraordinary and Minister Plenipotentiary of the Republic of Colombia to the United States of Mexico on 11 March 1936 by President Alfonso López Pumarejo. He arrived in Mexico City on 20 June of the same year to assume his official duties replacing Fabio Lozano Torrijos, and officially presented his letters of credence later that year to the President of Mexico, Lázaro Cárdenas del Río on 18 August.

== Personal life ==
Born on 13 February 1891 in Curití, Santander, he was the youngest child of Jesús Galvis Arena and Hortencia Galvis Galvis, his siblings were Guillermo, Rodolfo and Leopoldo, and shortly after his birth, his mother died of cancer. While serving as diplomat in Mexico, he met Tina Galvis Baroni, a Cuban lady of Italian descent whom he married in March 1938 in Mexico City, but who died later that year on 7 December 1938 after giving birth to their daughter Tina. Back in Colombia, he married Alicia Ramírez Navas on 18 January 1941 in Curití, and with whom he had four children, Hortensia, Alejandro, Silvia, and Virgilio.
