= La Violencia =

Civil war in Colombia from 1948 to 1958

- Part of the Colombian Civil Wars and the Cold War
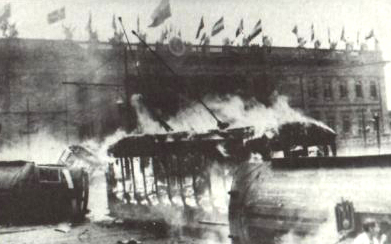
- Tram on fire in front of the Congress during the Bogotazo
- Date: 9 April 1948 – 1958
- Location: Colombia
- Result: Stalemate: Creation of the National Front; Start of the Colombian conflict in 1960

Parties
Colombian government: Colombian Conservative Party; Paramilitary groups; Pájaros; Los Chulavitas	Colombian Liberal Party; Paramilitary groups; Colombian Communist Party; Grupos de Autodefensas Campesinas

Lead figures
Mariano Ospina Pérez; Laureano Gómez Castro; General Gustavo Rojas Pinilla; Colombian Military Junta; Alberto Lleras Camargo; Guillermo Leon Valencia; León Maria Lozano "El Condor"; Jair Giraldo; Efraín González Téllez	Guadalupe Salcedo; Dumar Aljure; Gerardo Loaiza; Saúl Fajardo; Eduardo Franco Isaza; Juan de La Cruz Varela; Juan de Jesús Franco; Jacinto Cruz Usma "Sangrenegra"; Teófilo Rojas Varón "Chispas"; Jacobo Prias Alape; Manuel Marulanda; Ciro Trujillo Castaño; Alfonso Castañeda

Casualties and losses
2,900 soldiers and 1,800 police officers dead (1948–57); 3,000–5,000 conservative paramilitaries dead	15,000 rebels dead (1948–58)
- 200,000 civilians killed (1947–60)

La Violencia (Spanish pronunciation: [la βjoˈlensja], The Violence) was a ten-year wave of civil conflict and unrest in Colombia from 1948 to 1958, between the Colombian Conservative Party and the Colombian Liberal Party, mainly fought in the countryside.

La Violencia is considered to have begun with the assassination on 9 April 1948 of Jorge Eliécer Gaitán, a Liberal Party presidential candidate and frontrunner for the 1949 November election. His murder provoked the Bogotazo rioting, which lasted ten hours and resulted in around 5,000 casualties. An alternative historiography proposes the Conservative Party's return to power following the election of 1946 to be the cause. Rural town police and political leaders encouraged Conservative-supporting peasants to seize the agricultural lands of Liberal-supporting peasants, which provoked peasant-to-peasant violence throughout Colombia.

La Violencia is estimated to have killed at least 200,000 people, almost 1 in 50 Colombians.

== Development ==
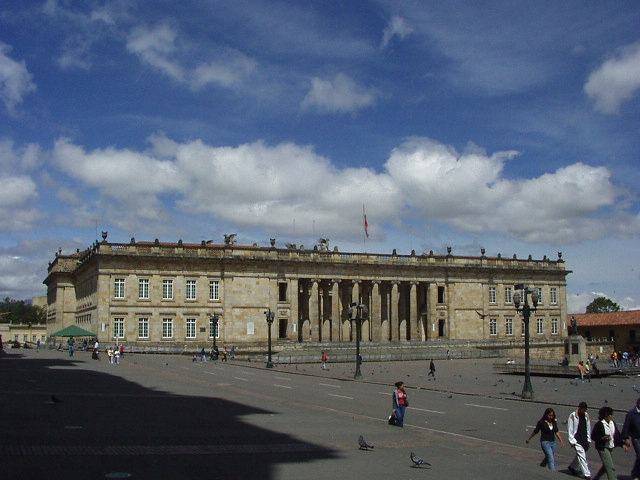
In September 1949, Senator Gustavo Jiménez was assassinated mid-session, in Congress.

The La Violencia conflict took place between the Military Forces of Colombia and the National Police of Colombia supported by Colombian Conservative Party paramilitary groups on one side, and paramilitary and guerrilla groups aligned with the Colombian Liberal Party and the Colombian Communist Party on the other side.

The conflict caused millions of people to abandon their homes and property. Media and news services failed to cover events accurately for fear of revenge attacks. The lack of public order and civil authority prevented victims from laying charges against perpetrators. Documented evidence from these years is rare and fragmented.

The majority of the population at the time was Catholic. During the conflict there were press reports that Catholic Church authorities supported the Conservative Party. Several priests were accused of openly encouraging the murder of the political opposition during Catholic mass, including the Santa Rosa de Osos Bishop Miguel Ángel Builes, although this is unproven. No formal charges were ever presented and no official statements were made by the Holy See or the Board of Bishops. These events were recounted in the 1950 book Lo que el cielo no perdona ("What heaven doesn't forgive"), written by the secretary to Builes, Father Fidel Blandon Berrio. Eduardo Caballero Calderón also recounted these events in his 1952 book El Cristo de Espaldas ("Backwards Christ"). After releasing his book, Blandon resigned from his position and assumed a false identity as Antonio Gutiérrez. However, he was eventually identified and legally charged and prosecuted for libel by the Conservative Party.

As a result of La Violencia there were no liberal candidates for the presidency, congress, or any public corporations in the 1949 presidential elections. The press accused the government of pogroms against the opposition. Censorship and reprisals were common against journalists, writers, and directors of news services; in consequence many media figures left the country. Jorge Zalamea, director of Critica magazine, fled to Buenos Aires; Luis Vidales to Chile; Antonio Garcia to La Paz, and Gerardo Molina to Paris.

== Timeline ==
=== Before 1946 ===
Since the 1920s, Conservatives had held the majority of governmental power, a position it would continue to occupy until the 2002 election of Alvaro Uribe. Even when Liberals gained control of the government in the 1930s, there was tension and even violent outbursts between peasants and landowners, as well as workers and industry owners. The number of yearly deaths from conflict, however, were far less than those estimated to have occurred during La Violencia.

=== 1946–1947 ===
In the 1946 election, Mariano Ospina Pérez of the Conservative party won the presidency, largely because the Liberal votes were split between two Liberal candidates. Mariano Ospina Pérez and the Conservative party Government used the police and army to repress the Liberal party. Their response was to fight back with violent protests. This led to an increasing amount of pressure within political and civil society. Some consider La Violencia having started at this point because the Conservative government began increasing the backlash against Liberal protests and small rebel groups. There were an estimated 14,000 deaths in 1947 due to this violence.

=== 1948 ===
On April 9, 1948, Liberal Party leader Jorge Eliécer Gaitán was assassinated by Juan Roa Sierra on the street in Bogotá, via three shots from a revolver. Gaitán was a popular candidate and would have been the likely winner of the 1950 election. This began the Bogotazo as angry mobs beat Roa Sierra to death and headed to the presidential palace with the intent of killing President Ospina Pérez. The murder of Gaitán and subsequent rioting sparked other popular uprisings throughout the country. Because of the Liberal nature of these revolts, the police and military, who had been largely neutral before, either defected or became aligned with the Conservative government.

=== 1949–1953 ===
Initially, Liberal leaders in Colombia worked with the Conservative government to stop uprisings and root out Communists. In May 1949, Liberal leaders resigned from their positions within the Ospina Pérez administration, due to the widespread persecution of Liberals throughout the country. Attempting to end La Violencia, the Liberals, who had majority control of Congress, began impeachment proceedings against President Ospina Pérez on November 9, 1949. In response, Ospina Pérez dissolved the Congress, creating a Conservative dictatorship. The Liberal Party decided to stage a military coup, and it was planned for November 25, 1949. However, many of the party members decided it was not a good idea and called it off. One conspirator, Air Force Captain Alfredo Silva, in the city of Villavicencio, had not been notified of the abandonment of the plan and carried it out. After rallying the Villavicencio garrison, he disarmed the police and took control of the city. Silva proceeded to urge others in the region to join the revolt, and Eliseo Velásquez, a peasant guerrilla leader, took Puerto López on December 1, 1949, as well as capturing other villages in the Meta River region. In this time, Silva was caught and arrested by troops from Bogotá coming to take back control of Villavicencio.

In 1950, Laureano Gómez was elected president of Colombia, but it was a largely manipulated election, leading Gómez to become the new Conservative dictator.

After Alfredo Silva's disappearance, Velásquez assumed power of the forces in the Eastern Plains that, by April 1950, included seven rebel zones with hundreds of guerrillas known as the "cowboys". While in command of the forces, Velásquez suffered from a superiority complex, leading him to commit abuses including body mutilation of those killed. Without sufficient arms, during the first major offensive of the Conservative army, the Liberal forces took major losses and confidence in Velásquez was lost. New populist leaders took control of the different groups of rebels and eventually came together to impose a 10% tax on wealthy landowners in the region. This tax created divisions from the wealthy Liberals and the Conservative government used them to recruit counter guerrillas. The Conservative army then increased its offensive attacks; committing atrocities along the way, they burned entire villages, slaughtered animals, and massacred suspected rebels, as well as set up a blockade of the region. The rebels were able to combat the offensive with small, covert, attacks to capture outposts and supplies. By June 1951, the government agreed to a truce with the guerrilla forces and they temporarily lifted the blockade.

A few months after the truce, larger army units were sent to the Eastern Plains to end the Liberal revolt, but they were still unsuccessful. In this time, the Liberal leadership in Bogotá realized the Conservatives were not giving up power any time soon, and they wanted to organise a national revolt. In December 1951 and January 1952, Alfonso López Pumarejo, the former Colombian president and leader of the Liberal Party, made visits to the Eastern Plains to renew his alliance with the "cowboys". When López Pumarejo returned to Bogotá he issued declarations stating that the guerrillas were not criminals but were simply fighting for freedom, and in response the Conservative dictatorship shut down the newspapers and imposed strict censorship. 1952 passed with only small skirmishes and no organised guerrilla leader, but by June 1953, Guadalupe Salcedo had assumed command.

In 1952 the future revolutionary leader Ernesto "Che" Guevara, then an unknown young man traveling through South America, briefly visited Bogotá. In a letter he wrote to his mother on July 6, 1952, later published in "The Motorcycle Diaries", Guevara noted that "There is more repression of individual freedom here than in any country we've been to, the police patrol the streets carrying rifles and demand your papers every few minutes". He went on to describe the atmosphere as "tense" and "suffocating", even hypothesizing that "a revolution may be brewing".

In other parts of Colombia, different rebel groups had formed in throughout 1950; they formed in Antioquia, Tolima, Sumapaz, and the Middle Magdalena Valley. On January 1, 1953, these groups came together to launch an attack against the Palanquero Air Base, with the hope of using the jet planes to bomb Bogotá and force the resignation of the Conservative dictatorship. The attack relied entirely on surprise to be successful, but the rebels were spotted by the sentry posts and were quickly hit with machine gun fire. The attempt was a failure, however it did incite fear into Bogotá elites.

== Conclusion ==
Most of the armed groups (called guerrillas liberales, a pejorative term) were demobilised during the amnesty declared by General Gustavo Rojas Pinilla after he took power on 13 June 1953. The most prominent Guerrilla leaders, Guadalupe Salcedo and Juan de la Cruz Varela, signed the 1953 agreement.

Some of the guerrilleros did not surrender to the government and organized into criminal bands or bandoleros, which caused intense military operations against them in 1954. One of them, the guerrillero leader Tirofijo, had changed his political and ideological inclinations from being a Liberal to supporting the Communists during this period, and eventually he became the founder of the communist Revolutionary Armed Forces of Colombia or FARC.

Rojas was removed from power on 10 May 1957. Civilian rule was restored after moderate Conservatives and Liberals, with the support of dissident sectors of the military, agreed to unite under a bipartisan coalition known as the National Front and the government of Alberto Lleras Camargo and which included a system of alternating the president and power-sharing both in cabinets and public offices.

In 1958, Lleras Camargo ordered the creation of the Commission for the Investigation of the Causes of "La Violencia". The commission was headed by the Bishop Germán Guzmán Campos.

The last bandolero leaders were killed in combat against the army. Jacinto Cruz Usma, alias Sangrenegra (Blackblood), died in April 1964 and Efraín Gonzáles in June 1965.

== Impacts ==
=== Humanitarian ===
Due to incomplete or non-existent statistical records, exact measurement of La Violencia's humanitarian consequences is impossible. Scholars, however, estimate that between 200,000 and 300,000 people died; 600,000 to 800,000 were injured; and almost one million people were displaced. La Violencia directly or indirectly affected 20 percent of the population.

La Violencia did not acquire its name simply because of the number of people it affected; it was the manner in which many of the killings, maimings, and dismemberings were done. Certain death and torture techniques became so commonplace that they were given names—for example, picar para tamal, which involved slowly cutting up a living person's body; or bocachiquiar, where hundreds of small punctures were made until the victim slowly bled to death. Former Senior Director of International Economic Affairs for the United States National Security Council and current President of the Institute for Global Economic Growth, Norman A. Bailey describes the atrocities succinctly: "Ingenious forms of quartering and beheading were invented and given such names as the 'corte de mica', 'corte de corbata' (aka Colombian necktie), and so on. Crucifixions and hangings were commonplace, political 'prisoners' were thrown from airplanes in flight, infants were bayoneted, schoolgirls, some as young as eight years old, were raped en masse, unborn infants were removed by crude Caesarian section and replaced by roosters, ears were cut off, scalps removed, and so on." While scholars, historians, and analysts have all debated the source of this era of unrest, they have yet to formulate a widely accepted explanation for why it escalated to the notable level it did.

=== Legal ===
As a result of La Violencia, landowners were allowed to create private armies for their security, which was formally legalized in 1965. Holding private armies was made illegal in 1989, only to be made legal once more in 1994.

=== Diplomatic ===
Colombia’s distillation of their post Violencia national consciousness put them at odds with Fidel Castro’s guerilla revolutionary ideology, especially given the temporal adjacency of Gaitan’s assassination and Castros contemporaneous visit to Colombia. During the early 1960s Colombia became a highly active participant in Latin American diplomacy, with a persisting dedication toward pursuit of peaceful pro-democratic self governance, even if frustrated for decades due to entrenched guerilla-driven approaches. These ideals were not imported from dichotomous cold war philosophies of the U.S. and the Soviet Union, but rather from home grown idealism emerging from the core of the Colombian people as a whole.

== Historical interpretations ==
The death of the bandoleros and the end of the mobs was not the end of all the violence in Colombia. One communist guerrilla movement, the Peasant Student Workers Movement, started its operations in 1959. Later, other organizations such as the FARC and the National Liberation Army emerged, marking the beginning of a guerrilla insurgency.

=== Credence in conspiracy theories as causes of violence ===
As was common of 20th-century eliminationist political violence, the rationales for action immediately before La Violencia were founded on conspiracy theories, each of which blamed the other side as traitors beholden to international cabals. The left were painted as participants in a global Judeo-Masonic conspiracy against Christianity, and the right were painted as agents of a Nazi-Falangist plot against democracy and progress.

==== Anticlerical conspiracy theory ====
After the death of Gaitán, a conspiracy theory was circulated by the left that leading conservatives, militant priests, Nazis and Falangists were involved in a plot to take control of the country and undo the country's moves toward progress. This conspiracy theory supplied the rationale for Liberal Party radicals to engage in violence, notably the anti-clerical attacks and killings, particularly in the early years of La Violencia. Some propaganda leaflets circulating in Medellín blamed a favorite of anti-Catholic conspiracy theorists, the Society of Jesus (Jesuits), for the murder of Gaitán.

Across the country, militants attacked churches, convents, and monasteries, killing priests and looking for arms, because they believed that the clergy had guns, a rumor which was proven to be false when no serviceable weapons were found during the raids. One priest, Pedro María Ramírez Ramos, was slaughtered with machetes and hauled through the street behind a truck, despite the fact that the militants had previously searched the church grounds and found no weapons.

Despite the circulation of the conspiracy theories and the propaganda after Gaitán was killed, most of the leftists who were involved in the rioting on 9 April learned from their errors, and as a result, they stopped believing that priests had harbored weapons.

The belief in the existence of some sort of conspiracy, a belief which was adhered to by members of both camps, made the political environment toxic, increasing the animosity and the suspicion which existed between both parties.

==== Judeo-Masonic conspiracy theory ====
The Conservatives were also motivated by their belief in the existence of a supposed international Judeo-Masonic conspiracy. In their view, they would prevent the Judeo-Masonic conspiracy from coming to fruition by eliminating the Liberals who were in their midst. In the two decades prior to La Violencia, Conservative politicians and churchmen adopted from Europe the Judeo-Masonic conspiracy theory to portray the Liberal Party as involved in an international anti-Christian plot, with many prominent Liberal politicians actually being Freemasons.

Although most of the rhetoric of conspiracy was introduced and circulated by some of the clergy, as well as by Conservative politicians, by 1942, many clerics became critical of the Judeo-Masonic conspiracy theory. Jesuits outside Colombia had already questioned and published refutations of the authenticity of The Protocols of the Elders of Zion, disproving the concept of a global Judeo-Masonic conspiracy. Regarding this same matter, Colombian clergy also came under the increasing influence of U.S. clergy; and Pius XI asked U.S. Jesuit John LaFarge, Jr. to draft an encyclical against anti-Semitism and racism. The belief in the existence of a Judeo-Masonic conspiracy played a prominent role in the politics of Laureano Gómez, who lead the Colombian Conservative Party from 1932 to 1953. More provincial politicians followed suit, and the fact that prominent national and local politicians voiced this conspiracy theory, rather than just a portion of the clergy, gave the idea greater credibility while it gathered momentum among the party's members.

The atrocities that were committed at the outset of the Spanish Civil War in 1936 were seen by both sides as a possible precedent for Colombia, causing both sides to fear that it could also happen in their country; this belief also spurred the credibility of the conspiracies and it also served as a rationale for violence. Anticlerical violence in the Republican zones in Spain in the first months of that war when anarchists, left-wing socialists and independent communists burned churches and murdered nearly 7,000 priests, monks, and nuns, and the conservatives used this to justify their own mass killings of Jews, Masons, and socialists.

== See also ==
- Central American crisis
- Colombian Civil War
- Colombian conflict
- History of Colombia
- History of FARC
- Liberalism and conservatism in Latin America
- List of civil wars
- List of conflicts in Central America
- List of conflicts in South America
- Marquetalia Republic
- Cali explosion
