= 1946 Colombian presidential election =

- 5 May 1946
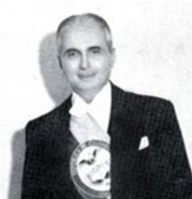

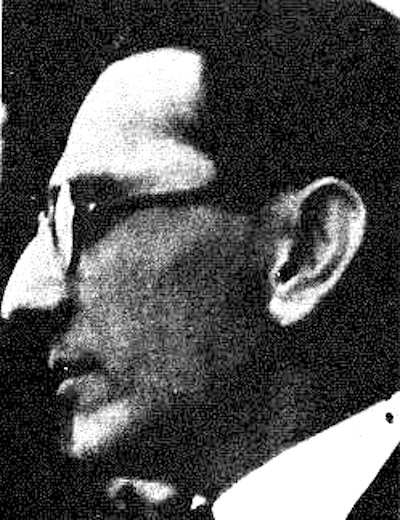

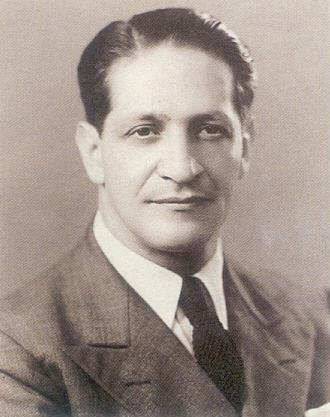
Nominee	Mariano Ospina Pérez	Gabriel Turbay	Jorge Eliécer Gaitán
Party	Conservative	Liberal	Liberal dissident
Popular vote	565,939	441,199	358,957
Percentage	41.43%	32.30%	26.28%
- Results by municipality
President before election
Alfonso López Pumarejo
Liberal
Elected President
Mariano Ospina Pérez
Conservative

Presidential elections were held in Colombia on 5 May 1946, pitching the Colombian Conservative Party against two different Colombian Liberal Party candidates. The Liberals received more votes combined, but due to their division the result was a victory for Mariano Ospina Pérez of the Conservative Party, who received 41.4% of the vote. One of the Liberal candidates, Gabriel Turbay, was also supported by the Social Democratic Party.

Two years after the election, the second Liberal Party candidate, Jorge Eliécer Gaitán Ayala, was assassinated. This in turn sparked a ten-year civil war known as La Violencia.

== Results ==
Candidate	Party	Votes	%
Mariano Ospina Pérez	Colombian Conservative Party	565,939	41.43
Gabriel Turbay	Colombian Liberal Party	441,199	32.30
Jorge Eliécer Gaitán Ayala	Colombian Liberal Party dissident	358,957	26.28
Total		1,366,095	100.00
Valid votes		1,366,095	99.99
Invalid/blank votes		177	0.01
Total votes		1,366,272	100.00
Registered voters/turnout		2,450,596	55.75
Source: Nohlen
