= Bogotazo =

1948 riots in Bogotá, Colombia

Coordinates: 4.6005°N 74.0741°W

- Part of La Violencia
Date	9 April 1948
Location	Bogotá and Cundinamarca, Colombia

Casualties and losses
- 2,585 killed, 450 wounded
- Casus belli: Assassination of Jorge Eliécer Gaitán by Juan Roa Sierra.

El Bogotazo (from "Bogotá" and the -azo suffix of violent augmentation) was a massive outbreak of rioting after the assassination in Bogotá, Colombia of Liberal leader and presidential candidate Jorge Eliécer Gaitán on 9 April 1948 during the government of President Mariano Ospina Pérez. The 10-hour riot left much of downtown Bogotá destroyed.

The aftershock of Gaitan's murder continued extending through the countryside and escalated a period of violence which had begun eighteen years before, in 1930, and was triggered by the fall of the conservative party from government and the rise of the liberals. The 1946 presidential elections brought the downfall of the liberals, allowing conservative Mariano Ospina Pérez to win the presidency. The struggle for power between both again triggered a period in the history of Colombia known as La Violencia ("The Violence") that lasted until approximately 1958; the civil conflict that continues to this day originated from that event.

== Background ==
During the 1940s the reigning political system in Colombia was called the convivencia, a politics of civility between liberals and conservatives.

On April 9, 1948, the 9th Pan-American Conference was being held in Bogotá. The Cold War was in its early stages with communist regimes installed throughout eastern Europe. Washington was eager to take a position against communism through a statement forwarded by General George Marshall, the U.S. Secretary of State and head of the American delegation, which was to be backed by the foreign ministers of the Latin American nations.

At the time, Jorge Eliécer Gaitán was the leader of the Liberal Party, and the most prominent politician in the country after President Ospina. He also possessed great oratory skills. His office was in downtown Bogotá, on the corner of Carrera 7 and Calle 14. Gaitán was a candidate in the presidential election, and with massive support among the country's working class, was seen as the candidate most likely to win. Both Conservatives and traditional Liberal elites were very concerned at this prospect.

=== March of Silence ===
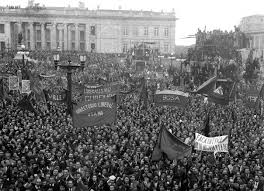
Plaza de Bolívar fully occupied by protesters, carrying black armbands, flags, and signs claiming the Liberal Party and the iconic figure of Jorge Eliécer Gaitán.

In early 1948, Gaitán led a demonstration known as the "March of Silence", attended by around 100 000 people from across the country. At the end of it, he delivered a speech known as the Prayer for Peace, addressed to President Ospina Pérez:

“... Mr. President: We ask you something simple for which speeches are unnecessary. We ask that the persecution by the authorities cease, as this immense crowd requests. We ask for a small and great thing: that political struggles develop within the channels of constitutionality. We ask you not to believe that our calmness, this impressive tranquility, is cowardice. We, Mr. President, are not cowards: we are descendants of the brave who annihilated tyrannies on this sacred ground. But we are capable, Mr. President, of sacrificing our lives to save the tranquility and peace and freedom of Colombia....”

On February 15, Gaitán expressed himself again in Manizales, this time with a speech called "Prayer for the Humble", as a tribute to 20 Liberals massacred in the department of Caldas:

“Comrades in struggle: at the foot of your graves we swear to avenge you, restoring with the victory of the Liberal Party the rights of peace and justice in Colombia. You have physically departed, but how tremendously alive you are among us...”

== Murder of Gaitán ==
Gaitán, a practicing attorney, arrived home early on the morning of the 9th of April after the successful ending to a case that he had been involved with. He returned to his office around 9:00 a.m., where he used to work on political matters until the afternoon. Later that day he was invited to lunch by a political supporter, Plinio Mendoza Neira. Other sympathizers would join them as well including a newspaper editor, a fellow politician and a physician. On their way out, the group was surprised by a lone gunman who fired several times at Gaitán from the front. Gaitán fell to the ground.

=== Suspect ===
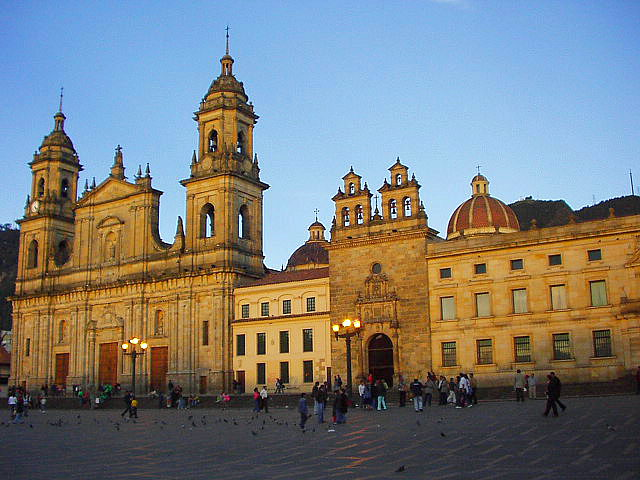
The corpse of Juan Roa was displayed by the mob in the Bolívar Square

The man suspected of killing Gaitán ran away heading south and pursued by an angry crowd. A policeman, Carlos Alberto Jiménez Díaz, tried to control the situation. According to police reports, the man surrendered to Jiménez, calling:

"Mi cabo, no deje que me maten" (My corporal, don't let them kill me)

In an attempt to avoid the mob, Jiménez locked both himself and his prisoner in the nearby Granada drugstore. Some witnesses subsequently interviewed by local newspapers (El Tiempo and El Espectador, issues from April to May, same year) claimed that the man who was taken into the drugstore was not the same one who was captured, and that in the confusion Officer Jiménez was mistaken because the other man was also wearing a gray hat. According to the drugstore owner, when he asked the prisoner why he had killed Gaitán, he replied:

"¡Ay Señor, cosas poderosas! ¡Ay, Virgen del Carmen, sálvame!" (Oh Lord, powerful things! Oh Virgin of Carmen, save me!)

After that, the doors were charged and the man was taken by the mob. His naked corpse was found later, in the Bolívar Square, outside the Casa de Nariño. His face was crushed with a brick, and his body was mutilated. A bystander, Gabriel Restrepo, collected the remains of his clothes and found some personal documents, which identified him as 26-year-old Juan Roa Sierra.

There have been a number of theories concerning Gaitán's murder, some claiming that the assassination was planned and undertaken by other persons in addition to Juan Roa Sierra; or that the latter was not the real killer. Roa Sierra was born into a poor family. There was a history of mental illness amongst Roa Sierra's brothers, and he may himself have been unstable. He was seen often in Gaitán's office asking for a job, since he was unemployed, but Gaitán had never received him. Some people who knew Roa Sierra stated that he never learned to shoot a gun, although Gaitán's assassin had fired accurate shots. Evidence shows that the gun used to kill Gaitán was sold two days before the crime, which does not provide enough time for Roa Sierra to learn to use a gun. So, it has been theorized that the crime was planned for political reasons and to promote interests of foreign countries, but this has never been corroborated. Publications have mentioned among others: the government of Mariano Ospina Pérez; sectors of the Liberal Party; the Colombian Communist Party; Fidel Castro; the CIA; and others that may have been involved in his murder.

== Riots ==
Radio Estación Últimas noticias, managed by followers of Gaitán, made the following broadcast some minutes later:

Últimas Noticias con ustedes. Los conservadores y el gobierno de Ospina Pérez acaban de asesinar al doctor Gaitán, quien cayó frente a la puerta de su oficina baleado por un policía. ¡Pueblo, a las armas! ¡A la carga! A la calle con palos, piedras, escopetas, cuanto haya a la mano. Asaltad las ferreterías y tomaos la dinamita, la pólvora, las herramientas, los machetes ...

Translation:

Breaking news for you. The Conservatives and the Ospina Pérez government have just assassinated doctor Gaitán, who fell in front of the door of his office, shot by a police officer. People, to arms! Charge! To the streets with clubs, stones, shotguns, whatever is at hand! Break into the hardware stores and take the dynamite, gunpowder, tools, machetes...

After that, instructions to make Molotov cocktails were broadcast.

People from everywhere in the city rushed downtown. Many were homeless people who had come to Bogotá to flee the violent political conflicts of rural Colombia. A large crowd formed outside Clinica Central, the hospital where Gaitan died.

At 1:20 p.m. President Ospina was notified of the murder and called for a council with his cabinet. After dumping the body of Roa outside the Casa de Nariño, the crowd attacked the palace with stones and bricks. Many cars, buses and streetcars were burned. A few hours later violence exploded in other cities, including Medellín, Ibagué and Barranquilla.

The leaders of the Liberal Party decided to nominate Darío Echandía to replace Gaitán as head of the party. From a balcony, he pleaded the crowd to stop the violence, but it was useless. The mobs tried to force entry to the Casa de Nariño. They were confronted by the Army, and many were killed. The offices of the government ministry and El Siglo newspaper were set on fire.

Most hardware stores were raided, especially in San Victorino district. People armed themselves with pipes, hooks, steel rods, hatchets, saws, and machetes. Some policemen joined the mobs. Others were confused and waited for orders that never came.

About 3:00 p.m, the mobs broke into the police headquarters. The major in charge, Benicio Arce Vera, came out unarmed to plead with the crowd, and gave orders to his men not to shoot. The mob trampled him and seized weapons and ammunition. According to Arce, in an interview years later to Bohemia magazine, among those who took the weapons was Fidel Castro, (La Habana, April 21, 1983, issue 16). Some writers say that this event influenced Castro at the age of 21, who had the opportunity to witness the initial violence and take views about the viability of an electoral route for political change. Others view it more darkly since Castro at that age had already been involved in violence in Cuba where he is reputed to have killed, or tried to kill, some university rivals (including Rolando Masferrer) by that time (Ros, 2003).

The leaders of the Liberal Party were still in the hospital, next to Gaitán's body, overwhelmed and at a loss as to how the chaos might be controlled. They received a phone call from the presidential palace, inviting them to a meeting to try to resolve their differences and find a solution. However, because of the conflict in the streets, the Liberal leaders could not reach the palace - some received shotgun wounds. Eventually they asked for a military escort, and successfully reached the palace. However, President Ospina was surprised to see the Liberal leaders, since the invitation had been made by some of his ministers without his knowledge. Discussions went throughout the night, but failed to reach an agreement.

The murder of Gaitán was followed by widespread confusion. Civilians took to the streets of the centro district sacking public buildings. Among these were the Ministry of Education, the Ministry of Public Health, the offices of the public prosecutor and the Ministry of Communications. The rioting also extended to private property with 157 buildings in the downtown area suffering serious damage, 103 of these were a total loss.

Many were killed over struggles for stolen goods. All sorts of merchandise was carried off to the poorer outlying districts. As reported some days later by Semana magazine (issue #78, April 24/1948), people started to sell the stolen objects at extremely low prices, or just exchanged the merchandise for alcohol. In the following days, a market for selling the stolen goods was set up, which was known as the "Feria Panamericana" (Pan-American Fair).

Trying to calm the riots, staff of the radio station "Últimas Noticias" — Gerardo Molina, Diego Montaña Cuéllar, Carlos Restrepo Piedrahita, Jorge Zalamea, Jorge Uribe Márquez, José Mar and others — planned to start a Revolutionary Council. They broadcast information about the constitution of this council and announced severe punishment to those who took advantage of the riots to commit crimes.

The Central Government, after defeating the mobs that were attacking the Justice Palace, showed little interest in the violence over the rest of the city. However, statements broadcast by Últimas Noticias claiming political power were perceived as a threat. The electricity in that district was shut down, and the Army was sent in to shut down transmission.

The rioting and violence that followed Gaitán's murder resulted in the deaths of 600-3,000 people, with 450 more hospitalized with injuries.

== See also ==
- Operation Pantomime
- Caracazo
- Cordobazo
- Rosariazo
