= National Leftist Revolutionary Union =

National Leftist Revolutionary Union Unión Nacional Izquierdista Revolucionaria
- Abbreviation: UNIR
- President: Jorge Eliécer Gaitán
- Founded: 1933
- Dissolved: 1935
- Split from: Colombian Liberal Party
- Merged into: Colombian Liberal Party
- Political position: Left-wing

The National Leftist Revolutionary Union (Spanish: Unión Nacional Izquierdista Revolucionaria, UNIR) was a left-wing Colombian political party founded by Jorge Eliécer Gaitán that operated in the early 1930s.

== History ==
The National Leftist Revolutionary Union (UNIR) was founded in 1933 by populist leader Jorge Eliécer Gaitán after he broke with the Colombian Liberal Party. In 1935, Gaitán decided to rejoin the Liberal Party, disbanding the UNIR the same year.
