= Jorge Eliécer Gaitán =

Colombian politician (1903–1948)

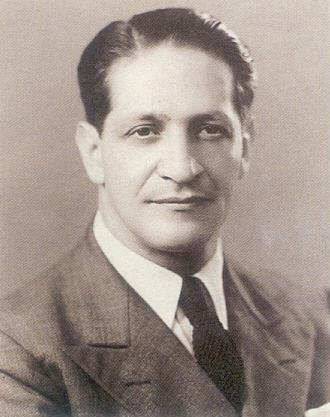

5th Minister of Labour, Health and Social Welfare of Colombia
- In office 8 October 1943 – 6 March 1944
- President: Alfonso López Pumarejo
- Preceded by: Abelardo Forero Benavides
- Succeeded by: Moisés Prieto

16th Minister of National Education of Colombia
- In office 1 February 1940 – 15 February 1942
- President: Eduardo Santos Montejo
- Preceded by: Alfonso Araújo Gaviria
- Succeeded by: Guillermo Nannetti Cárdenas

746th Mayor of Bogotá
- In office June 1936 – March 1937
- Preceded by: Francisco José Arévalo
- Succeeded by: Gonzalo Restrepo Jaramillo

Member of the House of Representatives of Colombia for Cundinamarca
- In office 1 March 1929 – 1 February 1931

Personal details
- Born: Jorge Eliécer Gaitán Ayala; 23 January 1903 Bogotá or Cucunubá or Manta, Cundinamarca, Colombia
- Died: 9 April 1948 (aged 45) Bogotá, D.C., Colombia
- Cause of death: Assassination
- Party: Colombian Liberal Party (until 1933, 1935–1948); National Leftist Revolutionary Union (1933–1935)
- Spouse: Amparo Jaramillo (m. 1936)
- Children: Gloria Gaitán
- Education: National University of Colombia (LL.D.); Sapienza University of Rome (J.D.)
- Profession: Lawyer

Jorge Eliécer Gaitán Ayala (Spanish pronunciation: ['xoɾxe eʎ'eθeɾ gai'tan aʝala]; 23 January 1903 – 9 April 1948) was a Colombian politician and statesman who was the leader of the Liberal Party. A nationalist, he served as the mayor of Bogotá from 1936–37, the national Education Minister from 1940–41, and the Labor Minister from 1943–44.

He was assassinated during his second presidential campaign in 1948, setting off the Bogotazo , and leading to the outbreak of a brutal ten-year civil war in Colombia known as La Violencia (1948–1958). His ideas, known as Gaitanismo, are considered a form of liberal socialism in Colombia.

== Early life and education ==
Born in Bogotá to parents who were rank-and-file members of the Liberal Party, Gaitán and his family had a tenuous hold in the middle class. His birth date is given variously as 1898 and 1903. Gaitán was born in a house in Las Cruces, a neighborhood situated in the center of Bogotá, Colombia. The house has a plaque commemorating Gaitán as a legendary caudillo.

Gaitán had a humble upbringing and he was exposed to poverty growing up in a neighborhood in the center of Bogotá called Egipto. Though he lived under these circumstances, he was the son of parents with white-collar occupations. His parents were Eliécer Gaitán and Manuela Ayala de Gaitán. His father was a history teacher, sold second-hand books, and was a journalist. In reading tales about Colombian history throughout his childhood, his father garnered Gaitán's interest in Colombian culture and politics. Manuela Ayala de Gaitán, a graduate of a teaching institute, taught her son to read and write. Her liberal and feminist tendencies ostracized her from many social environments, but she eventually taught at a school where her views were not persecuted. Gaitán's mother held great respect for higher education and encouraged her son to pursue it. However, Gaitán's father wanted him to work in a practical job. He did not want him to pursue higher education, which became a contentious topic that strained their father-son relationship.

Gaitán joined formal education at the age of 12. His disdain for conventional authority began during his time at school. He was unreceptive to strict discipline and traditional curricula. Gaitán was expelled from a school for tossing an inkwell at a teaching Christian Brother. Later in 1913, Gaitán received a scholarship to attend Colegio Araújo, a liberal school whose students were predominantly upper-class offspring of members of the Liberal Party. The school was founded by Simon Araújo who was a champion of progressive views. He provided the medium for students to receive a liberal education in a country that was dominantly conservative at the time. In 1918, Gaitán drafted a letter to the Colombian newspaper, El Tiempo, emphasizing the importance of higher education. He was advocating for teaching the disadvantaged populace subjects outside of traditional curricula, including topics such as hygiene. These classes were to be held at a Sunday school and provided a medium to further provide education to a wider range of people. Through his student leadership roles and intellectual ambitions, Gaitán shaped his dreams of becoming Colombian President to combat political, social, and economic inequality. Gaitán transferred from Colegio Araújo because it did not possess the necessary accreditations to ensure success in his academic and career ambitions. Gaitán graduated as one of the top students in his new school, Colegio of Martín Restrepo Mejía in 1919.

Against the wishes of his father, Gaitán enrolled in the National University in Bogotá. With a group of fellow students, he founded the University Center of Cultural Propaganda in May 1920. He drew inspiration from university students in Lima, Peru who were successful in their attempts for an educational extension program formulated for workers. As President of the University Center, Gaitán traveled throughout the city expressing the goals of the organization, focusing on social and proletariat apprehensions. Following the feminist rhetoric of his mother, Gaitán made speeches urging the uplift of the role of women in Colombian society. Moreover, he extended the Center's work to rural workers, public school children, and education for prisoners.

== Political career ==
=== Early political career ===
Gaitán was active in politics in the early 1920s, when he was part of a protest movement against the president Marco Fidel Suárez.

Gaitán increased his nationwide popularity following a banana workers' strike in Magdalena in 1928.

After US officials in Colombia, along with United Fruit representatives, portrayed the workers' strike as "communist" with "subversive tendency," in telegrams to the US Secretary of State, the US government threatened to invade with the US Marine Corps if the Colombian government did not act to protect United Fruit's interests. Strikers were fired upon by the army on the orders of the United Fruit Company, which resulted in numerous deaths.

Gaitán used his skills as a lawyer and as an emerging politician in order to defend workers' rights and called for accountability to those involved in the Santa Marta Massacre. Public support soon shifted toward Gaitán; Gaitán's Liberal Party won the 1930 presidential election.

In 1933, he created the "Unión Nacional Izquierdista Revolucionaria" ("National Leftist Revolutionary Union"), or UNIR, as his own dissident political movement after he had broken with the Liberal Party.

=== Political discourse ===
It is said that Gaitán's main political asset was his profound and vibrant oratory, often classified as populist by contemporaries and later analysts. It attracted hundreds of thousands of union members and low-income Colombians. The writer Harry Bernstein considered that the promises that he made to the people were as important to his appeal as his impressive public speaking skills, promises that Bernstein felt made him almost a demagogue and led Bernstein to compare him with Juan Perón of Argentina.

In particular, Gaitán repeatedly divided the country into the oligarchy and the people and called the former corrupt and the latter admirable, worthy, and deserving of Colombia's moral restoration. He stirred the audience's emotions by aggressively denouncing social, moral and economical evils stemming both from the Liberal and Conservative Parties and promised his supporters that a better future was possible if they all worked together. In 1946, Gaitán referred to the difference between what he called the "political country" and the "national country". Accordingly, the "political country" was controlled by the interests of the oligarchy and its internal struggles and so did not properly respond to the real demands of the "national country" of citizens in need of better socioeconomic conditions and greater sociopolitical freedom.

He was criticized by the more orthodox sectors of the Colombian Liberal Party, which considered him too unruly, most of the Colombian Conservative Party; and the leadership of the Colombian Communist Party, which saw him as a competitor for the political affections of the masses. Gaitán was warned by US Ambassador Beaulac on 24 March 1948 that Communists were planning a disruption of the impending conference and that his Liberal Party would likely be blamed.

The subject of future land reform was also prominent in some of his speeches.

=== Gaitanista Program ===
The Gaitanista Program is an elaboration of Gaitán's political, social, and economic missions for Colombia. The socialist program found in the Plataforma del Colón and Plan Gaitán detailed reforms developed in his earlier works, which include "Socialist Ideas in Colombia" and the "Manifesto of Unirismo" The aims of the program were to reform the Colombian system, which was believed to foster a political and economic monopoly for the elite in the republic. The reforms were designed to broaden the reach of state governance by incentivizing political participation among actors such as farmers, peasants, and middle and lower-class citizens. That would have been done by forming development agencies under the fundamental belief that economic democracy was nonexistent in Colombian society.

The "Plataforma de Colón" included various provisions designed to reduce the levels of income inequality in Colombia through fortification of the production force. This was to be achieved through national protection of Colombian industries, progressive tax reforms intended to efficiently distribute wealth, financial support for agricultural development, and nationalization of public services. In addition to these reforms, the platform extended proposals to specializing education for wider accessibility, redistributing land, enhancing labor protest laws, and heightening the legal codes of the judiciary. The foreign policy outlooks of the platform intended to inaugurate a conference to create an economic union among different nation-states in Latin America.

"Plan Gaitán" was a more comprehensive proposal for the creation of institutions dealing with specific issue areas. One of the major focus areas was the Colombian Central Bank. The plan strived to expand the Central Bank's capabilities of regulating the financial market. This meant the bank needed more powerful mechanisms of controlling the private sector such as implementing a Directing council. The reforms also included the ability to grant credit, as well as act as a reserve. The plan also focused on creating the Colombian Corporation of Credit, Development, and Savings. This would be divided into three different sectors: The Institute of Credit, Institute of Development, and the Institute of Saving. The Institute of Credit was proposed to afford loans to industrial and agricultural firms. The Gaitanista program encompassed the populist ideals Gaitán advocated for during the final years of his life. His ambitions to fortify democracy and the economy of Colombia through what was seen as anti-imperialist and anti-plutocratic.

=== Late political career ===
After formally rejoining the Liberal Party in 1935, Gaitán was selected as mayor of Bogotá in June 1936, a position he held for eight months. During his administration, he tried to implement a number of programs in areas such as education, health, urban development and housing. His attempted reforms were cut short by political pressure groups and conflicts due to some of his policies (for example, an attempt to provide uniforms to taxi and bus service drivers). In September 1937 his daughter Gloria Gaitán was born.

Gaitán was named Minister of Education in 1940 under the administration of the Liberal Party's Eduardo Santos (1938–1942), where he promoted an extensive literacy campaign as well as cultural activities.

At the conclusion of the Liberal Party's national convention in 1945 he was proclaimed as "the people's candidate" in a public square, an unusual setting under the political customs at the time.

The Liberal Party was defeated in the May 1946 elections by the Conservatives' Mariano Ospina Pérez (565,939 votes, president from 1946 to 1950) due to its own internal divisions, evidenced by its presenting two different candidates, Gaitán (358,957 votes) and Gabriel Turbay (441,199 votes), in that year's race.

Gaitán became leader of the Colombian Liberal Party in 1947, when his supporters gained the upper hand in the elections for seats in Congress. This would have allowed for the Liberal Party to present a single candidate for the 1950 elections.

== Assassination and aftermath ==
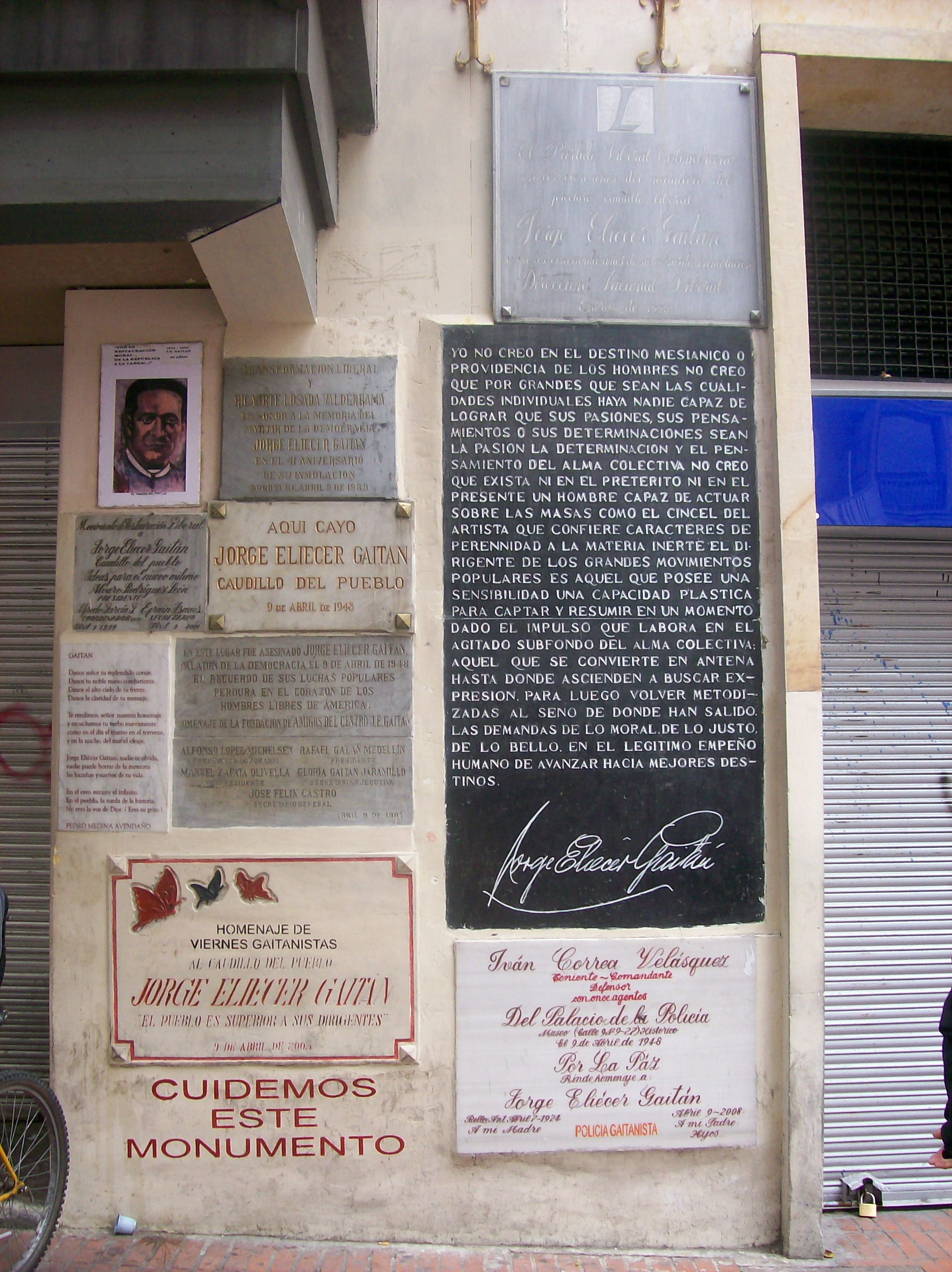
Memorial to Jorge Eliécer Gaitán in front of the place at which he was assassinated in Bogotá

It is widely speculated that Gaitán would likely have been elected President had he not been assassinated on 9 April 1948. That occurred immediately prior to the armed insurrection or Bogotazo. Gaitán was then the leading opponent of the use of violence and had determined to pursue the strategy of electing a left-wing government, and he had repudiated the violent communist revolutionary approach that was typical of the Cold War era. His assassination directly led to a period of great violence between conservatives and liberals and also facilitated the rise of the existing communist guerrillas. Over the next fifteen years as many as 200,000 people died from the disorder that followed his assassination.

Gaitán's alleged murderer, Juan Roa Sierra, was killed by an enraged mob, and his motivations were never known. Many different entities and individuals have been held responsible as the alleged plotters, including his different critics, but no definite information has ever come forward, and a number of theories persist. Among them, are versions that, sometimes conflictingly, implicate the government of Mariano Ospina Pérez, sectors of the Liberal party, the Soviet Union , the Colombian Communist Party, or the CIA. According to one version, Roa Sierra acted under the orders of CIA agents John Mepples Spirito (alias Georgio Ricco) and Tomás Elliot, as part of an anti-leftist plan that was supposedly called Operation Pantomime. It is claimed that it would also have involved the complicity of the then-Chief of Police, who would allegedly have ordered two police officers to abandon Juan Roa Sierra to be killed by the mob, a claim that conflicts with mainstream accounts of Roa Sierra's death. An eyewitness to the actual events, Guillermo Pérez Sarmiento, Director of the United Press in Colombia, stated that upon his arrival Roa was already "between two policemen" and describes in detail the angry mob that kicked and "tore him to pieces" and does not suggest any police involvement.

Another theory states that Juan Roa simply got tired and disenchanted of lobbying Jorge Eliécer Gaitán to get a job. He had a history of job instability and considered that he could get a position worthy of his status as a reincarnation of Santander and Quesada. He had an initial conversation with Jorge Eliécer and was advised to write a letter to the President, which he did, but still did not get a job. After that, he had visited Jorge Eliécer Gaitán's office several times in the two months prior to the assassination. The revolver was purchased two days before the assassination and the ammunition the day before. It was only on his last visit, on 9 April, when the secretary finally wrote his name to be considered by Jorge Eliécer.

Other details which have interested historians and researchers include the fact that Gaitán was murdered in the middle of the 9th Pan-American Conference, which was being led by U.S. Secretary of State George Marshall, a meeting which led to a pledge by members to fight communism in the Americas, as well as the creation of the Organization of American States.

Another event in the country's capital Bogotá was taking place at the time: a Latin American Youth Congress, organized to protest the Pan American conference. This meeting was organized by a young Fidel Castro, and was funded by Perón. Castro had an appointment to meet Gaitán, whom he very much admired, later in the afternoon on the day of his murder, and had also met with Gaitán two days earlier. It appears that Gaitán was contemplating supporting this conference. Gaitán commanded large audiences when he spoke and was one of the most influential men in the country.

The assassination provoked a violent riot known as the Bogotazo (loose translation: the sack of Bogotá, or shaking of Bogotá), and a further ten years of violence during which at least 300,000 people died (a period known as La Violencia). Some writers say that this event influenced Castro's views about the viability of an electoral route for political change.

Also in the city that day was another young man who would become a giant of 20th-century Latin-American history: Colombian writer and Nobel Prize Laureate Gabriel García Márquez. A young law student and short story writer at the time, García Márquez was eating lunch near the scene of the assassination. He arrived on the scene shortly after the shooting and witnessed the murder of Gaitán's presumed assassin at the hands of enraged bystanders. García Márquez discusses this day at vivid length in the first volume of his memoirs, Living to Tell the Tale. In his book, he describes a well-dressed man who eggs on the mob before fleeing in a luxurious car that arrived just as the presumed assassin was being dragged away and alleges that it was this man who was Gaitán's true assassin.

A fictionalized account of the final days of the assassin's life and of a possible conspiracy leading up to the assassination were presented in the 2013 feature film Roa.

== Legacy ==
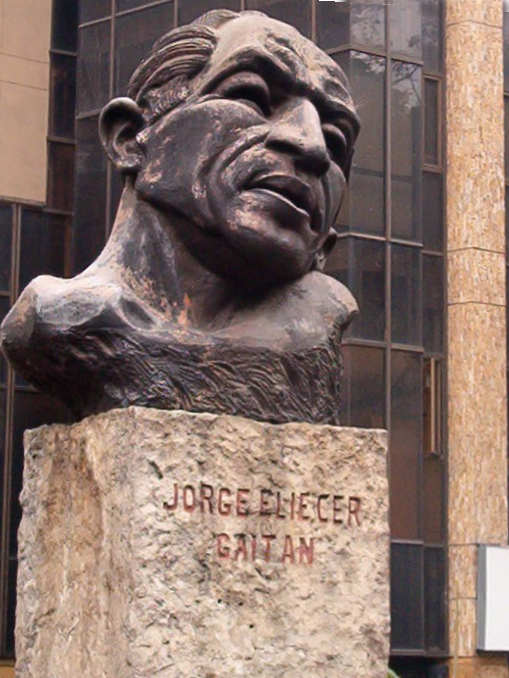
Monument to Gaitán, in Medellín, Colombia

As Gaitan could not have a proper funeral because of the chaotic public disorder, his relatives were forced to bury him in his own house, which is now known as Jorge Eliécer Gaitán House Museum, where his remains still rest. The bipartisan violence later spread to other regions during the period known as La Violencia.

A popular story, perhaps apocryphal, relates that during a debate with the Conservative candidate for president, Gaitán asked him how he made his living. "From the land," the other candidate replied.
"Ah, and how did you get this land?" asked Gaitán.
"I inherited it from my father!"
"And where did he get it from?"
"He inherited it from his father!"
The question is repeated once or twice more, and then the Conservative candidate concedes, "We took it from the Natives."
Gaitán's reply was, "Well, we want to do the opposite: we want to give the land back to the Natives."

The Jorge Eliécer Gaitán Theatre in Bogotá was named after Gaitán in 1973; it had previously been known as the Teatro Colombia.

Gaitian’s political movements and ideas became known as Gaitanism

== See also ==
- Jorge Eliecer Gaitan Museum
- Bogotazo
- Colombian Liberal Party
- La Violencia
- Communism in Colombia
- Colombian Conservative Party
- Colombian Communist Party
- Revolutionary Armed Forces of Colombia
- History of FARC
