= History of terrorism =

The history of terrorism involves significant individuals, entities, and incidents associated with terrorism. Scholars often agree that terrorism is a disputed term, and very few of those who are labeled terrorists describe themselves as such; it is common for opponents in a violent conflict to describe the opposing side as terrorists or as practicing terrorism.

Depending on how broadly the term is defined, the roots and practice of terrorism can be traced at least to the 1st-century AD Sicarii Zealots, though some dispute whether the group, which assassinated collaborators with Roman rule in the province of Judea, were in fact terrorists. The first use in English of the term 'terrorism' occurred during the French Revolution's Reign of Terror, when the Jacobins, who ruled the revolutionary state, employed violence, including mass executions by guillotine, to compel obedience to the state and intimidate state enemies. The association of the term only with state violence and intimidation lasted until the mid-19th century, when it began to be associated with non-governmental groups. Anarchism, often in league with rising nationalism and anti-monarchism, was the most prominent ideology linked with terrorism. Near the end of the 19th century, anarchist groups or individuals committed assassinations of a Russian Tsar and a U.S. president.

In the 20th century, terrorism continued to be associated with a vast array of anarchist, socialist, fascist and nationalist groups, many of them engaged in 'third world' independence struggles. Some scholars also labeled as terrorist the systematic internal violence and intimidation practiced by states such as the Stalinist Soviet Union and Nazi Germany.

== Definition ==
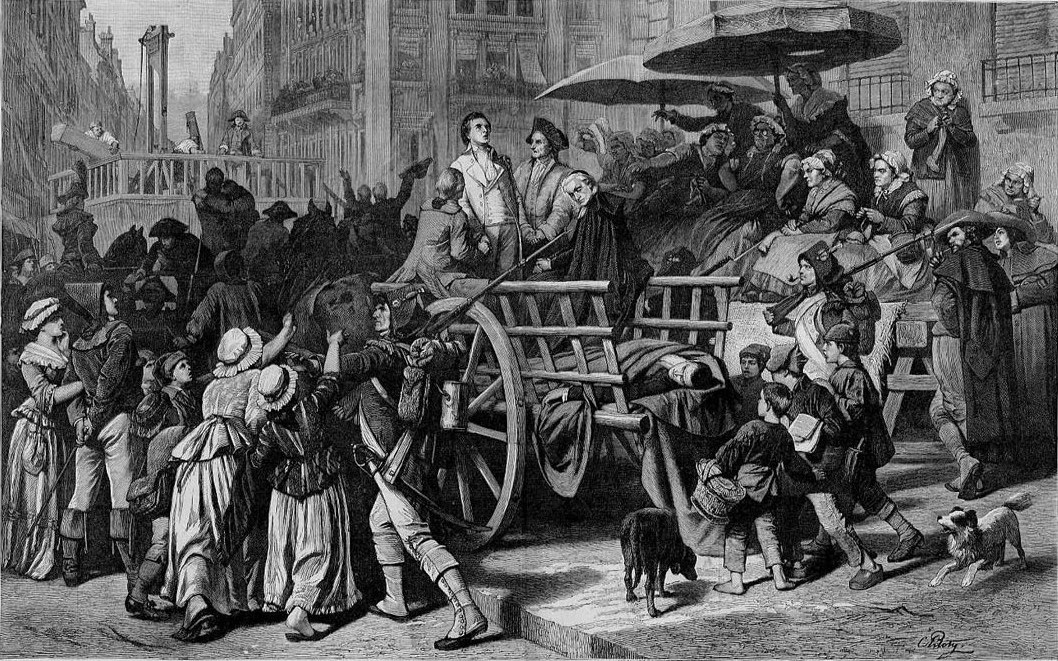
"Enemies of the people" headed for the guillotine during the Reign of Terror

There is no scholarly consensus over the definition of the term "terrorism." This in part derives from the fact that the term is politically and emotionally charged, "a word with intrinsically negative connotations that is generally applied to one's enemies and opponents."

The term "terrorist" is believed to have originated during the Reign of Terror (September 5, 1793 – July 28, 1794) in France. It was a period of eleven months during the French Revolution when the ruling Jacobins employed violence, including mass executions by guillotine, in order to intimidate the regime's enemies and compel obedience to the state. The Jacobins, most famously Robespierre, sometimes referred to themselves as "terrorists". Some modern scholars, however, do not consider the Reign of Terror a form of terrorism, in part because it was carried out by the French state. French historian Sophie Wahnich distinguishes between the revolutionary terror of the French Revolution and the terrorists of the September 11 attacks:

Revolutionary terror is not terrorism. To make a moral equivalence between the Revolution's year II and September 2001 is historical and philosophical nonsense ... The violence exercised on 11 September 2001 aimed neither at equality nor liberty. Nor did the preventive war announced by the president of the United States.

The French Revolution also influenced conceptions of non-state terrorism in the 19th century. Although the French Revolutionary and Napoleonic Wars ended with the victory of autocracies opposed to France and with the restoration of the Bourbon dynasty, European conservative rulers feared revolutionaries who would overthrow their governments or carry out similar forms of psychological violence. The late 18th and early 19th centuries did see the growth of secret societies dedicated to beginning similar liberal revolutions to the French Revolution, causing conservative autocratic governments to become paranoid of radical terrorist conspiracies.

== Early terrorism ==
Scholars disagree about whether the roots of terrorism date back to the 1st century and the Sicarii Zealots, to the 11th century and the Hashshashin, to the 19th century and the Fenian Brotherhood and Narodnaya Volya, or other eras. The Sicarii and the Hashshashin are described below, while the Fenian Brotherhood and Narodnaya Volya are discussed in a later section. John Calvin's rule of Geneva has been described as a reign of terror. Other historical events sometimes associated with terrorism include the Gunpowder Plot, an attempt to destroy the English Parliament in 1605.

During the 1st century AD, the Jewish Zealots in Judaea Province rebelled against the Roman Empire, killing prominent collaborators such as the Sadducees running the Second Temple and the Hasmonean dynasty. In 6 AD, according to contemporary historian Josephus, Judas of Galilee formed a small and more extreme offshoot of the Zealots, the Sicarii ("dagger men"). Their efforts were also directed against Jewish "collaborators," including temple priests, Sadducees, Herodians, and other wealthy elites. According to Josephus, the Sicarii would hide short daggers under their cloaks, mingle with crowds at large festivals, murder their victims, and then disappear into the panicked crowds. Their most successful assassination was of the High Priest of Israel Jonathan.

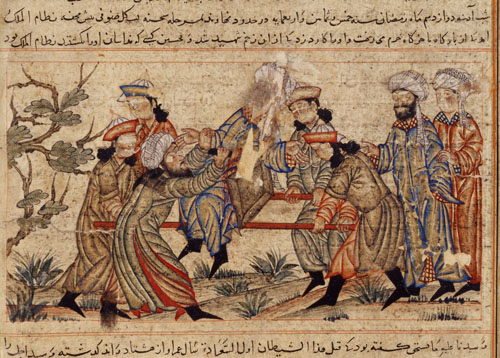
Assassination of the de facto Seljuq ruler Nizam al-Mulk by an Assassin under Hassan-i Sabbah

The first group of people whose members were called terrorists in the Islamic world were the Kharijites, who declared that any Muslim, regardless of lineage or ethnicity, was eligible to serve as caliph as long as they were morally upright, and that Muslims had a duty to rebel against and overthrow sinful caliphs. They consequently rose up in revolt against both the legitimate rulers and the Muslim rulers who did not uphold Islamic law. The Kharijites were the first sect in Islamic history to practice takfir, allowing them to use it as a defence for killing people they deemed to be heretics; they believed that heretics were apostates who were worthy of punishment. The sect bears similarity with later "takfiri" doctrines of Islamism. In the late 11th century, the Hashshashin (a.k.a. the Assassins) arose, an offshoot of the Isma'ili sect of Shia Muslims. Led by Hassan-i Sabbah and opposed to Fatimid and Seljuq rule, the Hashshashin militia seized Alamut and other fortress strongholds across Persia. They briefly seized power in Isfahan before the populace revolted against their brutal rule. Hashshashin forces were too small to challenge enemies militarily, so they assassinated city governors and military commanders in order to create alliances with militarily powerful neighbors. For example, they killed Janah al-Dawla, ruler of Homs, to please Ridwan of Aleppo, and assassinated Mawdud, Seljuk emir of Mosul, as a favor to the regent of Damascus. The Hashshashin also carried out assassinations as retribution. Under some definitions of terrorism, such assassinations do not qualify as terrorism, since killing a political leader does not intimidate political enemies or inspire revolt. (see also List of assassinations by the Assassins)

The Sons of Liberty was a clandestine group that was formed in Boston and New York City in the 1770s. It had a political agenda of independence of Britain's American colonies. The groups engaged in several acts that could be considered terroristic and used the deeds for propaganda purposes.

== Gunpowder Plot ==
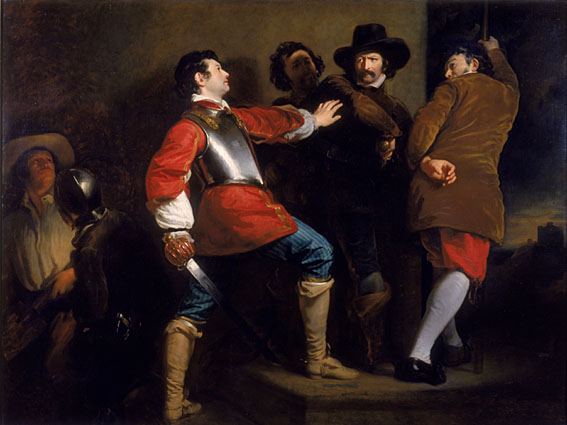
The Discovery of the Gunpowder Plot (c. 1823) by Henry Perronet Briggs.

After Queen Elizabeth I restored the Church of England as the state church after years of persecution of Protestants under her sister Mary I, Pope Pius V excommunicated her and called on English Catholics to depose her. His successor Sixtus V and King Philip II of Spain sponsored numerous plots against her, which continued after she was succeeded by her cousin James VI and I.

On November 5, 1605, a group of conspirators led by Robert Catesby attempted to destroy the English Parliament on its State Opening by King James I. They planned in secret to detonate a large quantity of gunpowder placed beneath the Palace of Westminster. The gunpowder was procured and placed by Guy Fawkes. The group intended to enact a coup by killing King James I and the members of both houses of Parliament. The conspirators planned to start a rebellion in the English Midlands, make one of the king's children a puppet monarch, and then restore the Catholic faith to England.

The conspirator leased a coal cellar beneath the House of Lords and began stockpiling gunpowder in 1604. As well as its primary targets, it would have killed hundreds, if not thousands, of Londoners – the most devastating act of terrorism in Britain's history, plunging the nation into a religious war. English spymasters uncovered the plot and caught Guy Fawkes with the gunpowder beneath Parliament. The other conspirators fled to Holbeach in Staffordshire. A shoot out on November 8 with authorities led to the deaths of Robert Catesby, Thomas Percy and the brothers Christopher and John Wright. The rest were captured. Fawkes and seven others were tried and executed in January 1606. The planned attack has become known as the Gunpowder Plot, and is commemorated in Britain every November 5, with fireworks displays and large bonfires where effigies of Guy Fawkes and the Pope are often burned. Comparisons are often drawn between the gunpowder plot and modern religious terrorism, such as the attacks in the US by Islamic terrorists on 9/11 2001.

== Emergence of modern terrorism ==
Terrorism was associated with state terror and the Reign of Terror in France, until the mid-19th century when the term also began to be associated with non-governmental groups. Early non-governmental terrorist groups include the nationalist Carbonari who sought to unite the Italian Peninsula under a liberal democratic government and the Luddites in Great Britain who sought to resist the Industrial Revolution by attacking mechanized textile plants. The term terrorism became increasingly used for acts of political violence from the 1840s onwards. Anarchism, often in league with rising nationalism, was the most prominent ideology linked with terrorism. Attacks by various anarchist groups led to the assassination of a Russian Tsar and a U.S. President.

In the 19th century, powerful, stable, and affordable explosives were developed, global integration reached unprecedented levels and often radical political movements became widely influential. The use of dynamite, in particular, inspired anarchists and was central to their strategic thinking.

=== Ireland ===
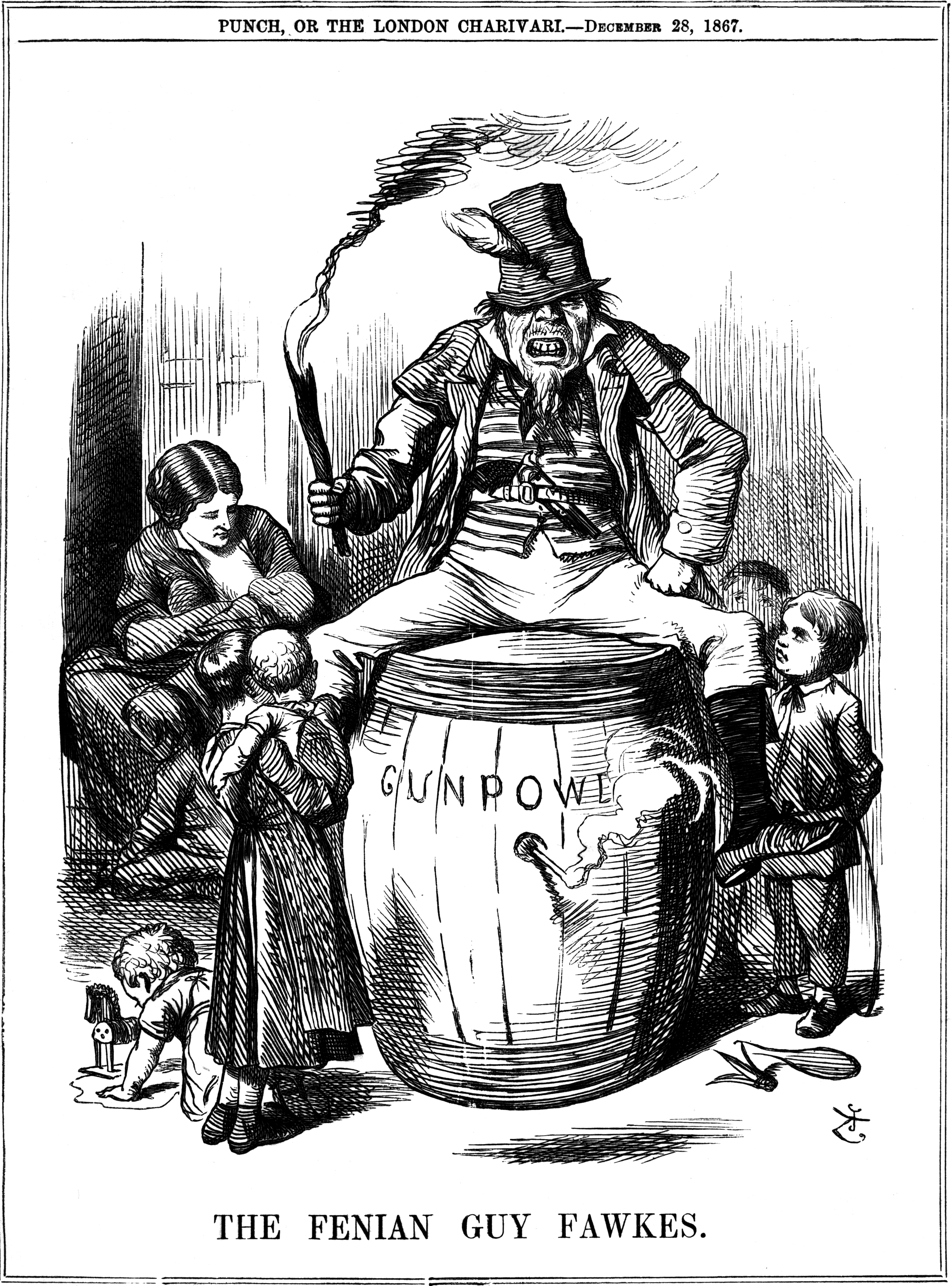
"The Fenian Guy Fawkes" by John Tenniel, published in Punch magazine, on 28 December 1867

One of the earliest groups to utilize modern terrorist techniques was arguably the Fenian Brotherhood and its offshoot the Irish Republican Brotherhood. They were both founded in 1858 as revolutionary, militant nationalist and Catholic groups, both in Ireland and amongst the émigré community in the United States.

After centuries of continued British rule in Ireland, and being influenced most recently from the devastating effects of the 1840s Great Famine, these revolutionary fraternal organisations were founded with the aim of establishing an independent republic in Ireland, and began carrying out frequent acts of violence in metropolitan Britain to achieve their aims through intimidation.

In 1867, members of the movement's leadership were arrested and convicted for organizing an armed uprising. While being transferred to prison, the police van in which they were being transported was intercepted and a police sergeant was shot in the rescue. A bolder rescue attempt of another Irish radical incarcerated in Clerkenwell Prison was made in the same year: an explosion to demolish the prison wall killed 12 people and caused many injuries. The bombing enraged the British public, causing a panic over the Fenian threat.

Although the Irish Republican Brotherhood condemned the Clerkenwell Outrage as a "dreadful and deplorable event", the organisation returned to bombings in Britain in 1881 to 1885, with the Fenian dynamite campaign, beginning one of the first modern terror campaigns. Instead of earlier forms of terrorism based on political assassination, this campaign used modern, timed explosives with the express aim of sowing fear in the very heart of metropolitan Britain, in order to achieve political gains. (Prime minister William Ewart Gladstone was partly influenced to disestablish the Anglican Church in Ireland as a gesture by the Clerkenwell bombing.) The campaign also took advantage of the greater global integration of the times, and the bombing was largely funded and organised by the Fenian Brotherhood in the United States.

The first police unit to combat terrorism was established in 1883 by the Metropolitan Police, initially as a small section of the Criminal Investigation Department. It was known as the Special Irish Branch, and was trained in counter terrorism techniques to combat the Irish Republican Brotherhood. The unit's name was changed to Special Branch as the unit's remit steadily widened over the years.

=== Russia ===
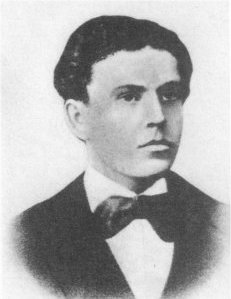
Ignacy Hryniewiecki, a terrorist who assassinated Tsar Alexander II of Russia

From the 1860s onwards dissident elements of the Russian Empire's intelligentsia became increasingly open to the idea of using political violence and terrorism to overthrow the Tsarist autocracy of the Romanov dynasty. The Narodniks called for a violent revolution to redistribute land to the peasant communes. Nikolay Chernyshevsky's novel What Is to Be Done? proved influential among the Narodniks, and his character Rakhmetov became a role model for Russian dissidents who resorted to terrorism.

The Narodniks drifted to anarchism or Marxism after the peasants failed to support the ideology. The anarchists developed the concept of "propaganda of the deed" (or "propaganda by the deed," from the French propagande par le fait), advocating physical violence or other provocative public acts against political enemies in order to inspire mass rebellion or revolution. One of the first individuals associated with this concept, the Italian revolutionary Carlo Pisacane (1818–1857), wrote in his "Political Testament" (1857) that "ideas spring from deeds and not the other way around." Anarchist Mikhail Bakunin (1814–1876), in his "Letters to a Frenchman on the Present Crisis" (1870) stated that "we must spread our principles, not with words but with deeds, for this is the most popular, the most potent, and the most irresistible form of propaganda." The French anarchist Paul Brousse (1844–1912) popularized the phrase "propaganda of the deed;" in 1877 he cited as examples the 1871 Paris Commune and a workers' demonstration in Bern provocatively using the socialist red flag. By the 1880s, the slogan had begun to be used to refer to bombings, regicides and tyrannicides. Reflecting this new understanding of the term, in 1895 Italian anarchist Errico Malatesta described "propaganda by the deed" (which he opposed the use of) as violent communal insurrections meant to ignite an imminent revolution.

Founded in Russia in 1878, Narodnaya Volya (Народная Воля in Russian; People's Will in English) was a revolutionary anarchist group inspired by Sergei Nechayev and by "propaganda by the deed" theorist Pisacane.= The group developed ideas, such as targeted killing of the "leaders of oppression," that would become the hallmark of subsequent violence by small non-state groups, and they were convinced that the developing technologies of the age—such as the invention of dynamite, which they were the first anarchist group to make widespread use of—enabled them to strike directly and with discrimination. Attempting to spark a popular revolt against Russian Tsardom, the group killed prominent political figures by gun and bomb in Saint Petersburg. They used the trials of captured members such as Vera Zasulich and Sergey Stepnyak-Kravchinsky as propaganda. On March 13, 1881, the group succeeded in assassinating Russia's Tsar Alexander II. The assassination, by a bomb that also killed the Tsar's attacker Ignacy Hryniewiecki, failed to spark the expected revolution, and an ensuing crackdown by the new Tsar Alexander III brought the group to an end.

=== Spread to continental Europe ===
Individual Europeans also engaged in politically motivated violence. For example, in 1878 the Italian anarchist Giovanni Passannante wounded Umberto I of Italy and Prime Minister Benedetto Cairoli in a knife attack while other anarchists threw bombs at monarchist political rallies. That same year German anarchists Max Hödel and Karl Nobiling attempted to assassinate Kaiser Wilhelm I, giving Chancellor Otto von Bismarck a pretext to pass the Anti-Socialist Laws banning the Social Democratic Party. Anarchism spread to the United States with working-class European immigrants. Although it ceased to be a truly influential movement after the Haymarket affair in 1886, public fears of it continued to play a role in U.S. politics and weakened the U.S. organized labor movement. In 1893, Auguste Vaillant, a French anarchist, threw a bomb in the French Chamber of Deputies in which one person was injured. In reaction to Vaillant's bombing and other bombings and assassination attempts, the French government restricted freedom of the press by passing a set of laws that became pejoratively known as the lois scélérates ("villainous laws"). In the years 1894 to 1896 anarchists killed President of France Marie Francois Carnot, Prime Minister of Spain Antonio Cánovas del Castillo, and the Empress of Austria-Hungary, Elisabeth of Bavaria.

=== United States ===
Prior to the American Civil War, abolitionist John Brown (1800–1859) advocated and practiced armed opposition to slavery, launching several attacks between 1856 and 1859, his most famous attack was launched against the armory at Harpers Ferry in 1859. Local forces soon recaptured the fort and Brown was tried and executed for treason. A biographer of Brown has written that Brown's purpose was "to force the nation into a new political pattern by creating terror." In 2009, the 150th anniversary of Brown's death, prominent news publications debated over whether or not Brown should be considered a terrorist.

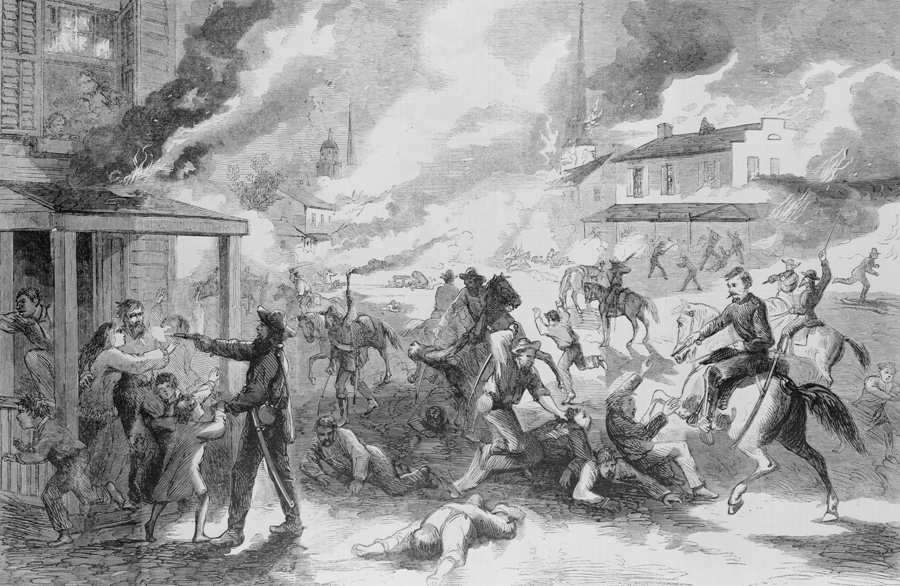
Massacre of the pro-Union inhabitants of Lawrence, Kansas by Quantrill's Raiders on August 21, 1863.

During the Civil War, pro-Confederate Bushwhackers and pro-Union Jayhawkers in Missouri and Kansas respectively engaged in cross border raids, committed acts of violence against civilians and soldiers, stole goods and burned down farms. The most infamous event occurred in Lawrence, Kansas on August 21, 1863, when Quantrill's Raiders led by William Quantrill ransacked the town and murdered about 190 civilians because of the town's anti-slavery sentiment.

On December 7, 1863, pro-Confederate British subjects from the Maritime Provinces hijacked the American steamer Chesapeake off the coast of Cape Cod, Massachusetts, killing a crew member and wounding three others in the ensuing gunfight. The intent of this hijacking was to use the ship as a blockade runner for the Confederacy under the belief that they had an official Confederate letter of marque. The perpetrators had planned to re-coal at Saint John, New Brunswick, and head south to Wilmington, North Carolina. Instead, the captors had difficulties at Saint John; so they sailed further east and re-coaled in Halifax, Nova Scotia. U.S. forces responded to the attack by trying to arrest the captors in Nova Scotian waters. All of the Chesapeake hijackers were able to escape extradition through the assistance of William Johnston Almon, a prominent Nova Scotian and Confederate sympathizer.

On October 19, 1864, Confederate agents operating from Canada raided the border town of St. Albans, Vermont, robbed $208,000 from three banks, holding hostages, killing a civilian and wounding two others, attempting to burn the entire town with Greek fire, then escaping back to Canada. The raiders were then arrested by British authorities under an extradition request from the U.S. government, but were later freed by a Canadian court on the grounds that they were considered combatants rather than criminals.

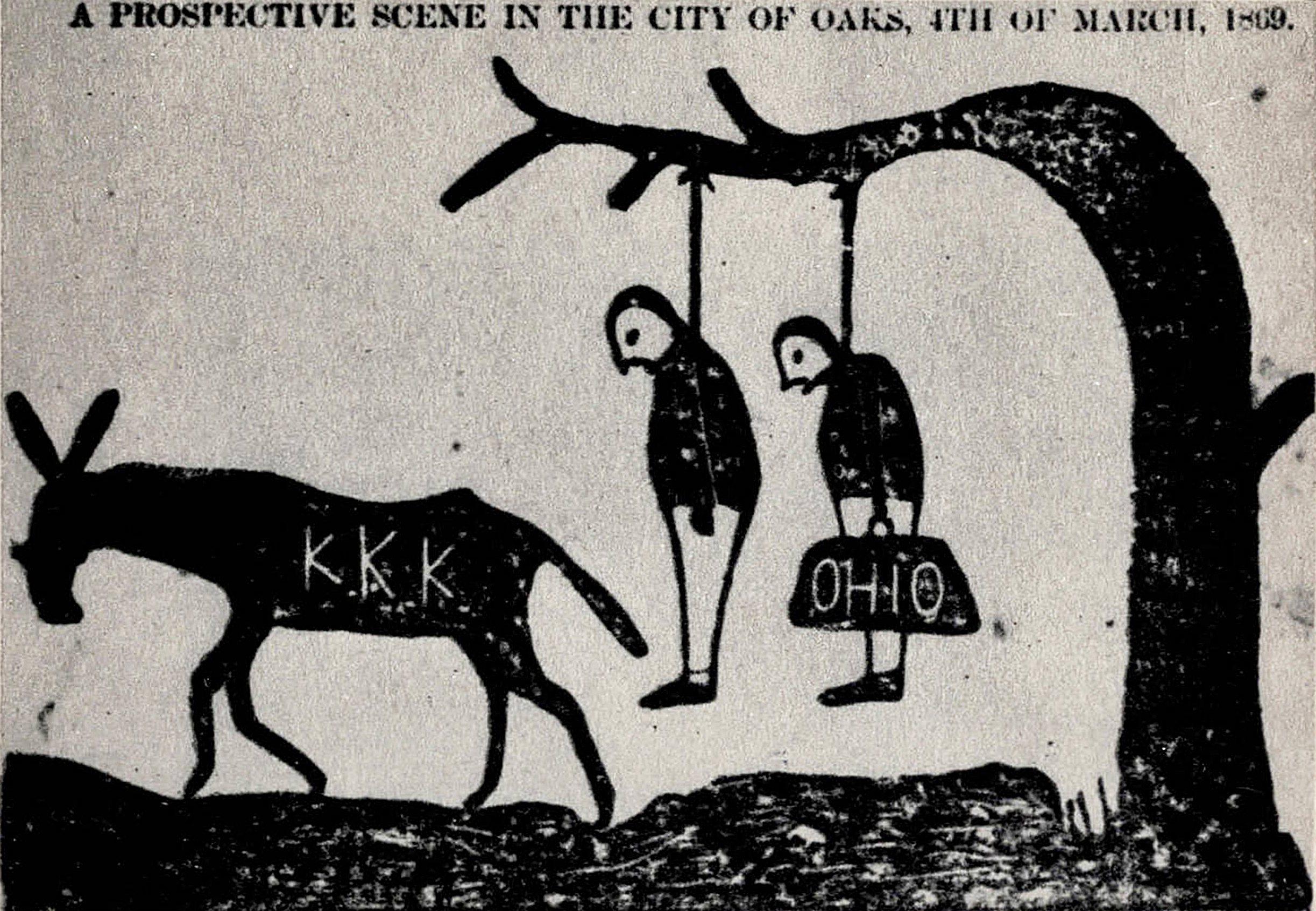
A cartoon threatening that the KKK will lynch carpetbaggers, in the Independent Monitor, Tuscaloosa, Alabama, 1868

After the Civil War, on December 24, 1865, six Confederate veterans founded the Ku Klux Klan (KKK). The KKK used violence, lynching, murder and acts of intimidation to oppress African Americans in particular, and it created a sensation with its masked forays' dramatic nature. Under President Ulysses Grant the federal government suppressed the Klan in the early 1870s, and it disappeared by the mid-1870s.

The Second KKK of the 1920s was an entirely new organization that used the old costumes and keywords. It added cross burning as a ritual. The group's politics were white supremacist, anti-Semitic, racist, anti-Catholic, and nativist. A KKK founder boasted that it was a nationwide organization of 550,000 men and that it could muster 40,000 Klansmen within five days' notice, but as a secret or "invisible" group with no membership rosters, it was difficult to judge the Klan's actual size. It was politically powerful at times, especially in Tennessee, Oklahoma, Indiana, Alabama and South Carolina.

=== The Ottoman Empire ===
Several nationalist groups used violence against an Ottoman Empire in apparent decline. One was the Armenian Revolutionary Federation (in Armenian Dashnaktsuthium, or "The Federation"), an Armenian nationalist revolutionary movement founded in Tiflis (Russian Transcaucasia) in 1890 by Christapor Mikaelian. Many members had been part of Narodnaya Volya or the Hunchakian Revolutionary Party. The group published newsletters, smuggled arms, and hijacked buildings as it sought to bring in European intervention that would force the Ottoman Empire to surrender control of its Armenian territories. On August 24, 1896, 17-year-old Babken Suni led twenty-six members in capturing the Imperial Ottoman Bank in Constantinople. The group demanded European intervention in order to stop the Hamidian massacres and the creation of an Armenian state, but backed down on a threat to blow up the bank. An ensuing security crackdown destroyed the group.

Also inspired by Narodnaya Volya, the Internal Macedonian Revolutionary Organization (IMRO) was a Macedonian nationalist revolutionary movement founded in 1893 by Hristo Tatarchev in the Ottoman-controlled Macedonian territories. Through assassinations and by provoking uprisings, the group sought to coerce the Ottoman government into creating a Macedonian nation. On July 20, 1903, the group incited the Ilinden uprising in the Ottoman Manastir vilayet. The IMRO declared the town's independence and sent demands to the European Powers that all of Macedonia be freed. The demands were ignored and Ottoman Army troops crushed the 27,000 rebels in the town two months later.

== Early 20th century ==
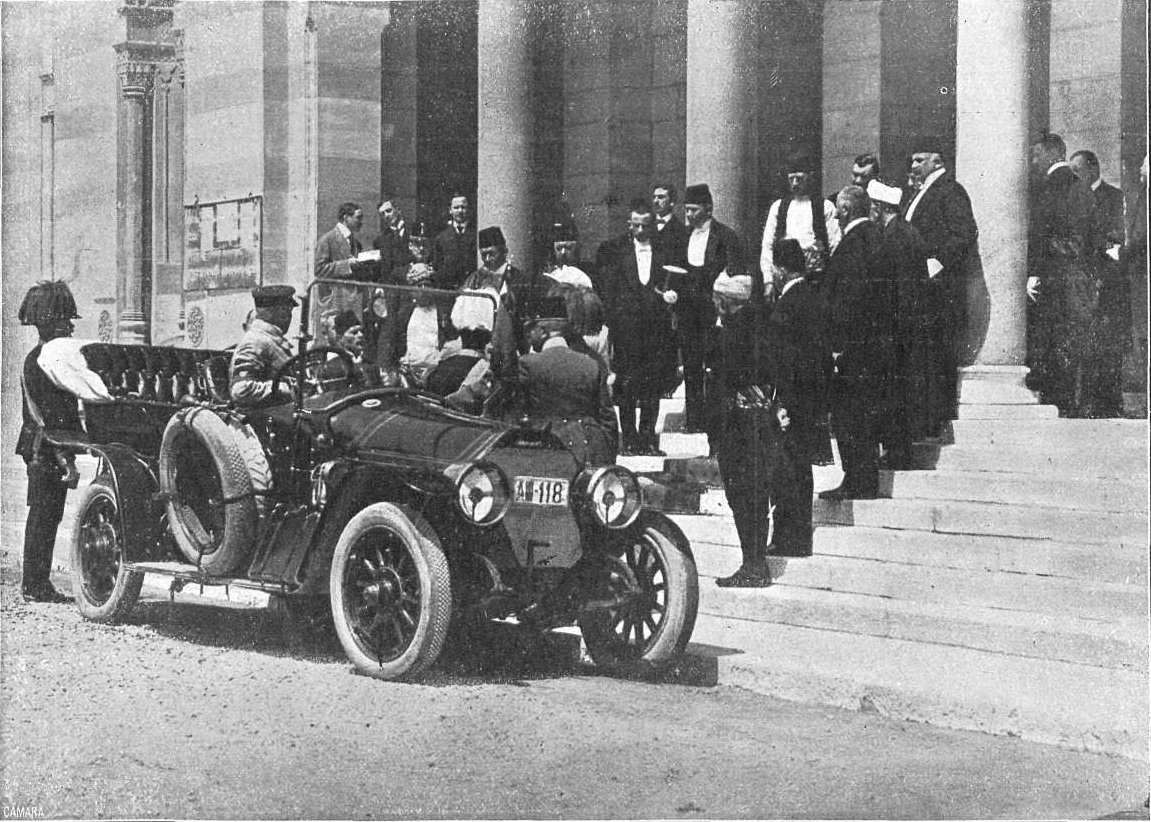
The assassination of the heir to the Austro-Hungarian throne, Archduke Franz Ferdinand of Austria, precipitated a global war

Revolutionary nationalism continued to motivate political violence in the 20th century, much of it directed against Western powers. The Irish Republican Army campaigned against the British in the 1910s and their tactics inspired Zionist groups such as the Hagannah, Irgun and Lehi to in their guerilla war against the Palestine Mandate throughout the 1930s. Like the IRA and the Zionist groups, the Muslim Brotherhood in Egypt used bombings and assassinations as part of their tactics.

Militant suffragettes of the Women's Social and Political Union carried out a series politically motivated bombing and arson attacks nationwide as part of their campaign for women's suffrage. There were three phases of WSPU militancy in 1905, 1908, and, most significantly, between 1912 and 1914. These action ranged from civil disobedience and destruction of public property to arson and bombings. Most notably, The WSPU bombed Government Minister and future Prime Minister David Lloyd George's house

Political assassinations continued, resulting in the assassination of King Umberto I of Italy in July 1900. The Polish-American anarchist Leon Czolgosz was inspired to by the killing to carry out the assassination of US President William McKinley in Buffalo, New York, September 1901. Despite the fact that Czolgosz had been a native-born citizen, the United States Congress responded by passing a law banning anarchists from immigrating to the United States. Despite the ban the Galleanist anarchists mostly consisting of Italian Americans continued to be active in the United States. In 1914 three Galleanists were found to be collaborating with Alexander Berkman in plotting an assassination of John D. Rockefeller Jr. in retaliation for the Ludlow Massacre. Berkman had previously tried to assassinate Henry Clay Frick in retaliation for the Homestead strike. After the American entry into World War I Congress additionally passed the Immigration Act of 1917 allowing for the deportation of resident aliens who promoted assassinations. Despite this Galleanists successfully sent letter bombs to industrialists and politicians while paranoia over left-wing political radicalism escalated when the Bolsheviks seized power in the Russian Revolution. After a letter bomb detonated at the home of Attorney General A. Mitchell Palmer, it caused the First Red Scare. The United States Department of Justice destroyed left-wing and radical political movements, including Marxism, anarchism, and the Industrial Workers of the World, through the Palmer Raids led by J. Edgar Hoover.

After several decades of stability, political violence in the Russian Empire resumed in the 1890s due to the repressive policies of Alexander III and Nicholas II, anti-Semitic pogroms, and the government's poor response to the Russian famine of 1891–1892. Political violence became especially widespread in Imperial Russia, and several ministers were killed in the opening years of the 20th century. The Socialist Revolutionary Party, founded in 1901 with the intent of starting an agrarian socialist revolution, founded the Combat Organization specifically to carry out acts of terrorism. The highest-ranking assassinated official was prime minister Pyotr Stolypin, killed in 1911 by Dmitry Bogrov, a spy for the secret police in several anarchist, socialist and other revolutionary groups. Violent attacks by anarchists, Marxists, and SRs escalated during the 1905 Russian Revolution and its aftermath before declining in the ten years after 1907.

On June 28, 1914, Gavrilo Princip, one of a group of six assassins, shot and killed Archduke Franz Ferdinand of Austria, heir to the Austro-Hungarian throne, and his wife, Sophie, Duchess of Hohenberg, in Sarajevo, the capital of the Condominium of Bosnia and Herzegovina. The assassinations produced widespread shock across Europe, setting in motion the July Crisis which led to World War I.

In the 1930s and 1940s, Nazi Germany and the Soviet Union practiced state terror systematically and on a massive and unprecedented scale. Meanwhile, the Stalin regime branded its opponents with the label "terrorist".

=== Suffragette bombing and arson campaign ===
Suffragettes in the United Kingdom of Great Britain and Ireland orchestrated a bombing and arson campaign between 1912 and 1914. The campaign was instigated by the Women's Social and Political Union (WSPU), and was a part of their wider campaign for women's suffrage. The campaign, led by key WSPU figures such as Emmeline Pankhurst, targeted infrastructure, government, churches and the general public, and saw the use of improvised explosive devices, arson, letter bombs, assassination attempts and other forms of direct action and violence. At least 5 people were killed in such attacks (including one suffragette), and at least 24 were injured (including two suffragettes). The campaign was halted at the British entry into World War I in August 1914 without having brought about votes for women, as suffragettes pledged to pause their campaigning to aid the nation's war effort.

The campaign has seen classification as a terrorist campaign, with both suffragettes themselves and the authorities referring to arson and bomb attacks as terrorism. Contemporary press reports also referred to attacks as "terrorist" incidents in both the United Kingdom and in the United States,

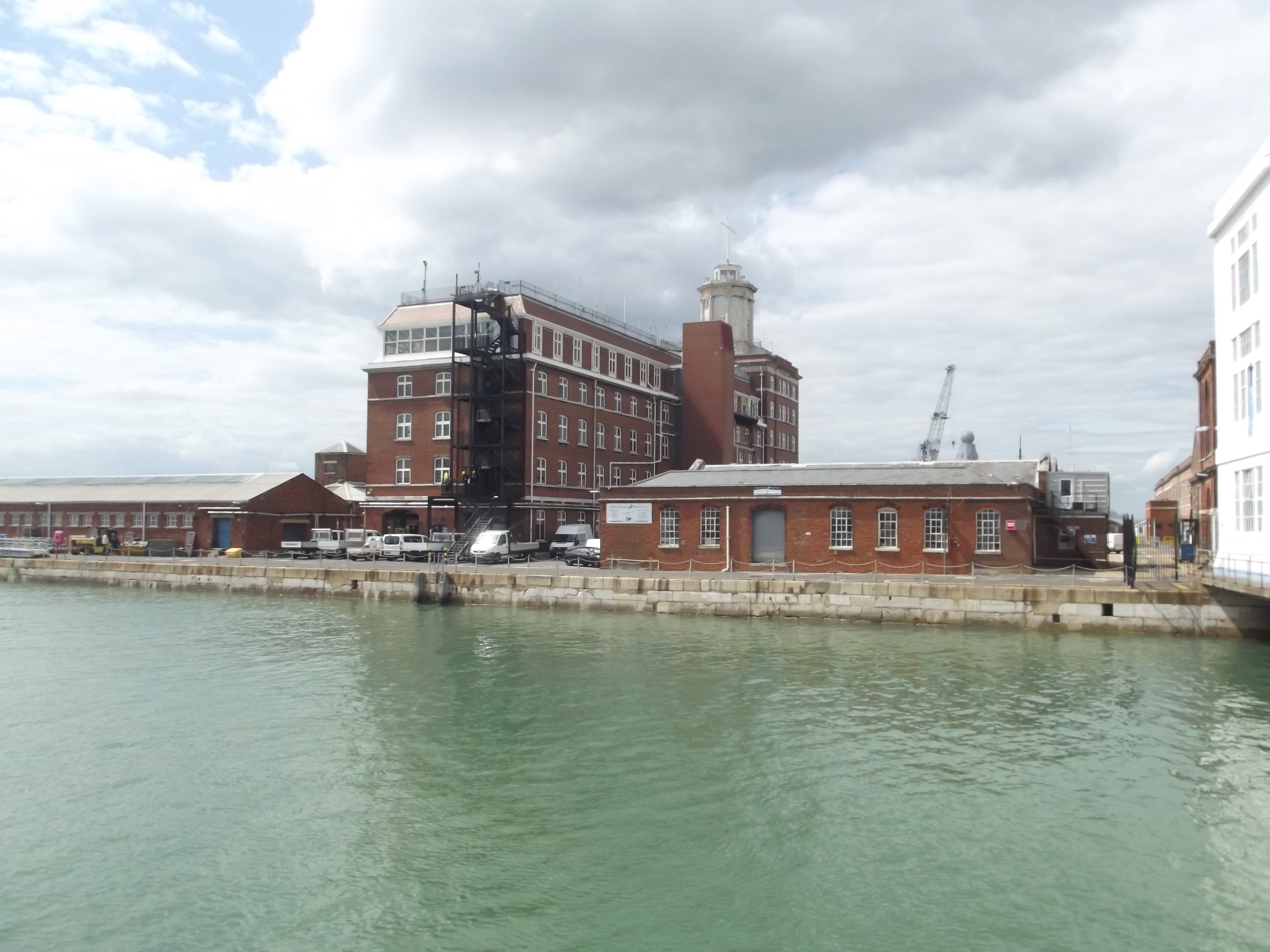
A fire started by suffragettes at the semaphore tower, Portsmouth dockyard, in December 1913 killed 2 men

In one of the more serious suffragette attacks, During the suffragette bombing and arson campaign of 1912–1914 a major terrorist incident occurred in the Portsmouth in 1913, which led to the deaths of two men. a fire was purposely started at Portsmouth dockyard on 20 December 1913, in which 2 sailors were killed after it spread through the industrial area. The fire spread rapidly as there were many old wooden buildings in the area, including the historic semaphore tower which dated back to the eighteenth century which was completely destroyed. The damage to the dockyard area cost the city £200,000 in damages, equivalent to £23,600,000 today. In the midst of the firestorm, a battleship, HMS Queen Mary, had to be towed to safety to avoid the flames.

The attack was notable enough to be reported on in the press in the United States, with the New York Times reporting on the disaster two days after with the headline "Big Portsmouth Fire Loss". The report also disclosed that at a previous police raid on a suffragette headquarters, "papers were discovered disclosing a plan to fire the yard".

The campaign in part provided the inspiration for later bombing and terrorist campaigns in Britain, such as those conducted by the Irish Republican Army (IRA). The S-Plan of 1939 to 1940 utilised the tactic of undertaking incendiary attacks on pillar boxes, and also saw the planting of explosive devices. The tactic of packing nuts and bolts into bombs to act as shrapnel, often regarded as a later twentieth-century IRA invention, was also first employed by the suffragettes. Several suffragette bombings, such as the attempted bombing of Liverpool Street station in 1913, saw the use of this method. The combination of high explosive bombs, incendiary devices and letter bombs used by suffragettes also provided the pattern for the IRA campaigns of the 1970s and 1980s. Unknown to many, the first terrorist bomb to explode in Northern Ireland in the twentieth century was not detonated by the IRA but by the suffragettes at Lisburn Cathedral in August 1914. Suffragette tactics also provided a template for more contemporary attacks in Britain.

=== Irish independence ===
In an action called the Easter Rising or Easter Rebellion, on April 24, 1916, members of the Irish Volunteers and the Irish Citizen Army seized the Dublin General Post Office and several other buildings, proclaiming an independent Irish Republic. The rebellion failed militarily but was a success for physical force Irish republicanism, leaders of the uprising becoming heroes in Ireland after their eventual sentence of capital punishment by the British government.

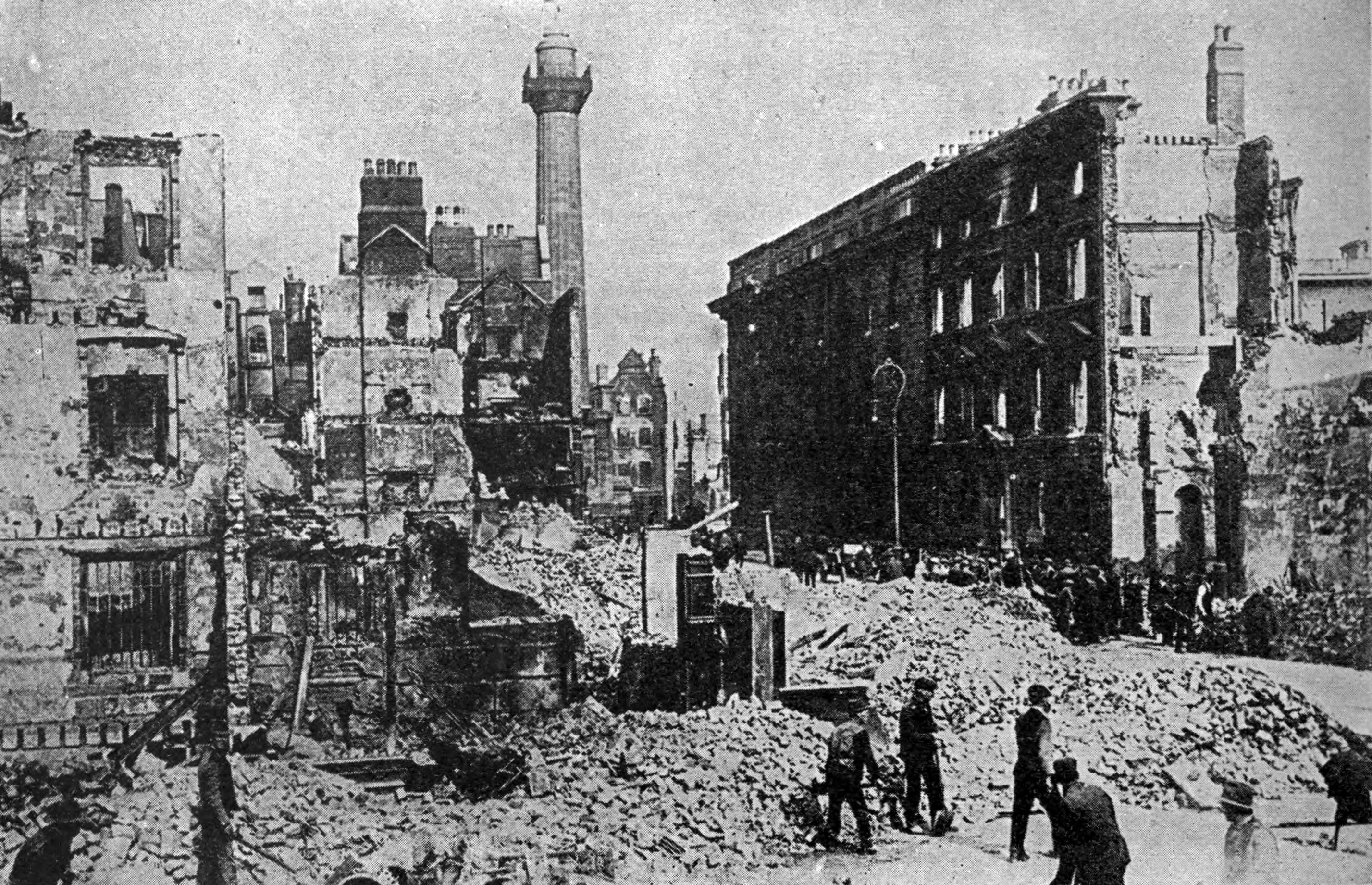
Rubble in the Sackville Street of Dublin after the failed Easter Rising in 1916.

Shortly after the rebellion, Michael Collins and others founded the Irish Republican Army (IRA), which from 1916 to 1923 carried out numerous attacks against the British authorities. For example, it attacked over 300 police stations simultaneously just before Easter 1920, and, in November 1920, publicly killed a dozen police officers and burned down the Liverpool docks and warehouses, an action that became known as Bloody Sunday.

After years of warfare, London agreed to the 1921 Anglo-Irish Treaty creating an Irish Free State encompassing 26 of the island's 32 counties. IRA tactics were an inspiration to other groups, including the Palestine Mandate's Zionists, and to British special operations during World War II.

The IRA are considered by some the innovators of modern insurgency tactics as the British would replicate and build upon the tactics used against them in World War II against the Germans and Italians. Tony Geraghty in The Irish War: The Hidden Conflict Between the IRA and British Intelligence wrote:

The Irish [thanks to the example set by Collins and followed by the SOE] can thus claim that their resistance provide the originating impulse for resistance to tyrannies worse than any they had to endure themselves. And the Irish resistance as Collins led it, showed the rest of the world an economical way to fight wars the only sane way they can be fought in the age of the Nuclear bomb.

— M. R. D. Foot, who wrote several official histories of SOE

From January 1939 to March 1940, the Irish Republican Army (IRA) carried out a campaign of bombing and sabotage against the civil, economic, and military infrastructure of Britain. It was known as the S-Plan or Sabotage Campaign. During the campaign, the IRA carried out almost 300 attacks and acts of sabotage in the United Kingdom, killing seven people and injuring 96. Most of the casualties occurred in the Coventry bombing on 25 August 1939.

=== Mandatory Palestine ===
Following the 1929 Hebron massacre of 67 Jews in the Mandate of Palestine, the Zionist militia Haganah transformed itself into a paramilitary force. In 1931, however, the more militant Irgun broke away from Haganah, objecting to Haganah's policy of restraint. Founded by Avraham Tehomi, Irgun sought to aggressively defend Jews from Arab attacks. Its tactic of attacking Arab communities, including the bombing of a crowded Arab market, is among the first examples of terrorism directed against civilians. After the British published the White Paper of 1939, which placed strict restrictions on Jewish immigration into Palestine (which was seen as unacceptable to Zionist groups), the Irgun began a campaign against the British authorities by assassinating police, capturing British government buildings and arms, and sabotaging railways. Irgun's best-known attack targeted the King David Hotel in Jerusalem, parts of which housed the headquarters of the British civil and military administrations. The bombing, in 1946, killed ninety-one people and injured forty-six, making it the most deadly attack during the Mandate era. This attack was sharply condemned by the organized leadership of the Yishuv, and further widened the gulf between David Ben-Gurion's Hagana and Begin's Irgun. Following the bombing, Ben-Gurion called Irgun an "enemy of the Jewish people". After the Israeli Declaration of Independence in 1948, Menachem Begin (Irgun leader from 1943 to 1948) transformed the group into the political party Herut, which later became part of Likud in an alliance with the center-right Gahal, Liberal Party, Free Centre, National List, and Movement for Greater Israel. On the 60th anniversary of the bombing, a plaque was unveiled at the hotel.

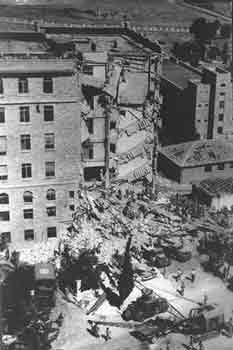
The King David Hotel, Mandatory Palestine, after the 1946 bombing.

Operating in the Palestine Mandate in the 1930s, Izz ad-Din al-Qassam (1882–1935) organized and established the Black Hand, a Palestinian nationalist militia. He recruited and arranged military training for peasants, and by 1935 had enlisted between 200 and 800 men. Al-Qassam obtained a fatwa from Shaykh Badr al-Din al-Taji al-Hasani, the Mufti of Damascus, authorizing an armed insurgency against the British and against the Jews of Palestine. Black Hand cells were equipped with bombs and firearms, which they used to kill Jews. Although al-Qassam's revolt was unsuccessful in his lifetime, many organizations gained inspiration from his example. He became a popular hero and an inspiration to subsequent Arab militants, who in the 1936–39 Arab revolt, called themselves Qassamiyun, followers of al-Qassam. The Izz ad-Din al-Qassam Brigades, the military wing of Hamas, as well as the rockets they developed, take their names after Qassam.

Lehi (Lohamei Herut Yisrael, a.k.a. "Freedom Fighters for Israel", a.k.a. the Stern Gang) was a revisionist Zionist group that splintered off from Irgun in 1940. Abraham Stern formed Lehi from disaffected Irgun members after Irgun agreed to a truce with Britain in 1940. Lehi assassinated prominent politicians as a strategy. For example, on November 6, 1944, Lord Moyne, the British Minister of State for the Middle East, was assassinated. The act was controversial among Zionist militant groups, Hagannah sympathizing with the British in this instance and launching a massive man-hunt against members of Lehi and Irgun. After Israel's 1948 founding, Lehi formally dissolved and its members became integrated into the Israel Defense Forces.

=== Resistance during World War II ===
Some of the tactics of the guerrilla, partisan, and resistance movements organised and supplied by the Allies during World War II, according to historian M. R. D. Foot, can be considered terrorist. Colin Gubbins, a key leader within the Special Operations Executive (SOE), made sure the organization drew much of its inspiration from the IRA.

On the eve of D-Day, the SOE organised with the French Resistance the complete destruction of the rail and communication infrastructure of western France the largest coordinated attack of its kind in history Allied supreme commander Dwight D. Eisenhower later wrote that "the disruption of enemy rail communications, the harassing of German road moves and the continual and increasing strain placed on German security services throughout occupied Europe by the organised forces of Resistance, played a very considerable part in our complete and final victory". The SOE also conducted operations in Africa, the Middle East and the Far East.

The SOE working with Norwegian resistance was vital in ending Germany's nuclear weapons programme. After repeated attacks on heavy water production facilities in Norway Germany sought to ship the last of the heavy water back to Germany in 1944. It would initial cross Lake Tinn by civilian ferry SF Hydro. The ferry was to carry railway cars with heavy water drums from the Vemork hydroelectric plant, where they were produced, across Lake Tinn so they could be shipped to Germany. The operatives planted explosives on the ferry the night before, and timed the explosives to sink and the deepest part of the lake. Despite the intention to minimize casualties, 18 people were killed. Twenty-nine survived. The dead comprised 14 Norwegian civilians and four German soldiers. Its sinking effectively ended Nazi nuclear ambitions.

The work of the SOE received recognition in 2009 with a memorial in London, however there are differing views on the morality of the SOE's actions; the British military historian John Keegan writing:

We must recognise that our response to the scourge of terrorism is compromised by what we did through SOE. The justification ... That we had no other means of striking back at the enemy ... is exactly the argument used by the Red Brigades, the Baader-Meinhoff gang, the PFLP, the IRA and every other half-articulate terrorist organisation on Earth. Futile to argue that we were a democracy and Hitler a tyrant. Means besmirch ends. SOE besmirched Britain.

== Post-war period and Cold War proxies ==
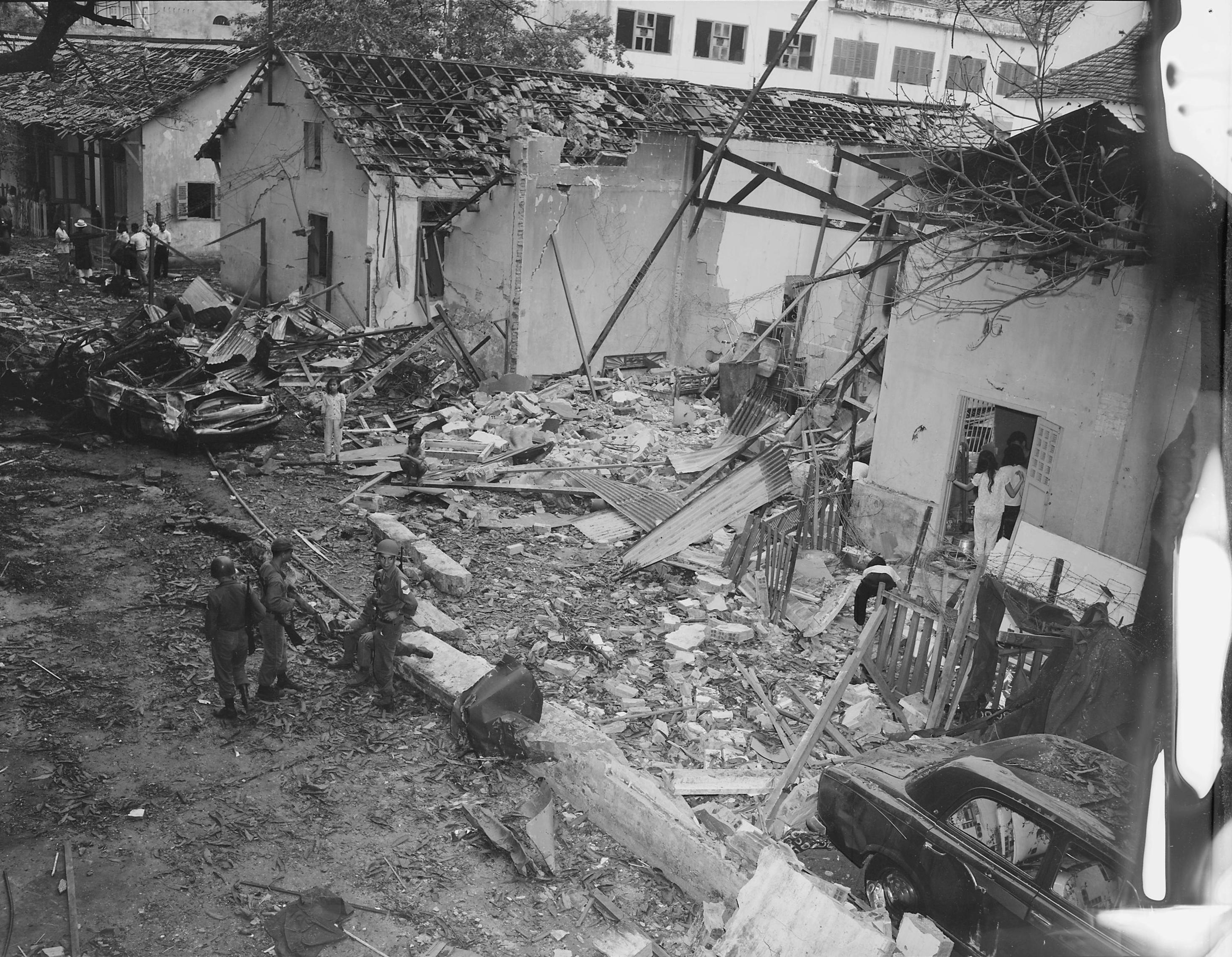
Aftermath of the 1964 Brinks Hotel bombing in Vietnam

In the aftermath of World War II, largely successful campaigns for independence were launched against the collapsing European empires, as many World War II resistance groups became militantly nationalistic. The Viet Minh, for example, which had fought against the Empire of Japan, now fought against the returning French colonists. In the Middle East, the Muslim Brotherhood used bombings and assassinations against the British in Egypt. Also during the 1950s, the National Liberation Front (FLN) in French-controlled Algeria and the Ethniki Organosis Kyprion Agoniston (EOKA) in British-controlled Cyprus waged guerrilla and open war against the authorities.

In the 1960s, inspired by Mao Zedong's Chinese Communist Revolution and Fidel Castro's Cuban revolution of 1959, national independence movements often fused nationalist and socialist impulses. This was the case with Spain's ETA, the Front de libération du Québec, and the Palestine Liberation Organization. In the late 1960s and 1970s, violent left-wing militant and revolutionary groups were on the rise, sympathizing with Third World guerrilla movements and seeking to spark anti-capitalist revolts. Such groups included Armenia's Armenian Secret Army for the Liberation of Armenia, the Japanese Red Army, the West German Red Army Faction (RAF), the Montoneros, the Italian Red Brigades (BR), and, in the United States, the Weather Underground. Nationalist groups such as the Provisional IRA and the Tamil tigers also began operations at this time.

Throughout the Cold War, both the United States and the Soviet Union made extensive use of violent nationalist organizations to carry on a war by proxy. For example, Soviet Armed Forces and Chinese People's Liberation Army advisers provided training and support to the Viet Cong during the Vietnam War. The Soviet Union also provided military support to the PLO during the Israeli–Palestinian conflict, and Fidel Castro during the Cuban Revolution. The United States funded groups such as the Contras in Nicaragua. The Mujahadeen of the late 20th and early 21st century had been funded in the 1980s by the United States and other Western powers because they were fighting the USSR in Afghanistan.

=== Middle East ===
Founded in 1928 as a nationalist social-welfare and political movement in the Kingdom of Egypt, the Muslim Brotherhood began to attack British Armed Forces soldiers and police stations in the late 1940s. Founded and led by Hassan al-Banna, it also assassinated politicians seen as collaborating with British rule, most prominently Egyptian Prime Minister Mahmoud El Nokrashy Pasha in 1948. In 1952 a military coup overthrew British rule, and shortly thereafter the Muslim Brotherhood went underground in the face of a massive crackdown. Though sometimes banned or otherwise oppressed by the Egyptian government, the group continues to exist in present-day Egypt.

The National Liberation Front (FLN) was an Algerian nationalist group founded in French-controlled Algeria in 1954. The group became a large-scale resistance movement against French rule, with terrorism only part of its operations. The FLN leadership took inspiration from the Viet Minh rebels who had made French Far East Expeditionary Corps troops withdraw from Vietnam in the First Indochina War. The FLN was one of the first anti-colonial groups to use large-scale compliance violence. The FLN would establish control over a rural village and coerce its peasants to execute any French loyalists among them. On the night of October 31, 1954, in a coordinated wave of seventy bombings and shootings known as the Toussaint attacks, the FLN attacked French Armed Forces installations and the homes of Algerian loyalists. In the following year, the group gained significant support for an uprising against loyalists in Philippeville. This uprising, and the heavy-handed response by the French, convinced many Algerians to support the FLN and the independence movement. The FLN eventually secured Algerian independence from France in 1962, and transformed itself into Algeria's ruling party.

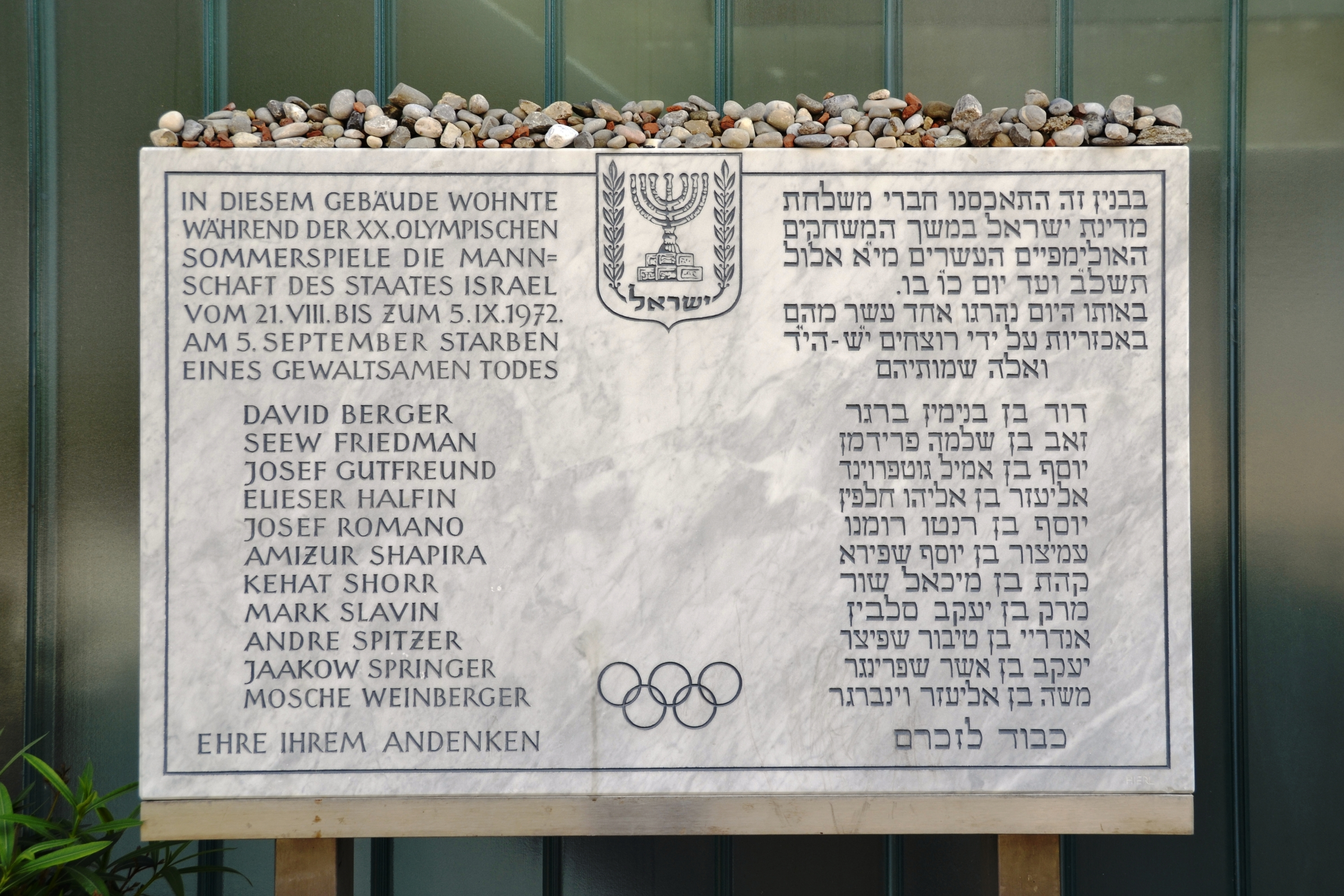
Plaque commemorating the eleven Israeli athletes killed during the 1972 Munich Olympics massacre.

Fatah was organized as a Palestinian nationalist group in 1954, and exists today as a political party in Palestine. In 1967 it joined the Palestine Liberation Organization (PLO), an umbrella organization for secular Palestinian nationalist groups formed in 1964. The PLO began its own armed operations in 1965. The PLO's membership comprises separate and possibly contending paramilitary and political factions, the largest of which include Fatah, the Popular Front for the Liberation of Palestine (PFLP), and the Democratic Front for the Liberation of Palestine (DFLP). Factions of the PLO have advocated or carried out acts of terrorism. Abu Iyad organized the Fatah splinter group Black September in 1970; the group is arguably best known for seizing eleven Israeli athletes as hostages at the September 1972 Summer Olympics in Munich. All the athletes and five Black September operatives died during a gun battle with the West German police in what later became known as the Munich massacre. The PFLP, founded in 1967 by George Habash, on September 6, 1970 hijacked three international passenger planes, landing two of them in Jordan and blowing up the third. Fatah leader and PLO chairman Yasser Arafat publicly renounced terrorism in December 1988 on behalf of the PLO, but Israel has stated that it has proof that Arafat continued to sponsor terrorism until his death in 2004.

In the 1974 Ma'alot massacre, 22 Israeli high-school students, aged 14 to 16 from Safed were killed by three members of the Democratic Front for the Liberation of Palestine. Before reaching the school, the trio shot and killed two Arab women, a Jewish man, his pregnant wife, and their 4-year-old son, and wounded several others.

In the 1960s and 1970s, various Middle Eastern terrorist groups sent their members to the Soviet Union for training in what was euphemistically called "low-intensity warfare" – essentially a softer term for terrorism. Over the span of nearly a decade, terrorism cultivated and backed by the Soviet Union operated freely in the Middle East and, to a limited extent, in Europe. The Soviets saw terrorism as compatible with their support for national liberation wars, even though it contradicted traditional Marxist-Leninist ideas about class struggle and violence against civilians. The Soviets also hoped that backing Palestinian terrorism against Israel would strengthen their position in the Arab world.

The People's Mujahedin of Iran (PMOI) or Mujahedin-e Khalq (founded in 1965), is an Islamic group that opposed the Shah and later Khomeini's rule in Iran. The group would go on to play an important role in the Shah's overthrow but was unable to capitalize on this in the following power-vacuum. The group renounced violence in 2003 and became protected persons.

In 1975, Hagop Tarakchian and Hagop Hagopian, with the help of sympathetic Palestinians, founded the Armenian Secret Army for the Liberation of Armenia (ASALA) in Beirut during the Lebanese Civil War. At that time, Turkey was embroiled in political turmoil, and Hagopian believed that the time was right for his organization to avenge the Armenians who died during the Armenian genocide and force the Turkish government to cede the territory of Wilsonian Armenia to the Armenian SSR so it could incorporate the territory of Wilsonian Armenia into it and establish a nation state. In its Esenboga airport attack, on 7 August 1982, two ASALA rebels opened fire on civilians in a waiting room at the Esenboga International Airport in Ankara. Nine people died and 82 were injured. By 1986, the ASALA had virtually ceased all attacks.

The "Partiya Karkerên Kurdistan" (Kurdistan Workers Party or PKK) was established in Turkey in 1978 as a Kurdish nationalist party. Founder Abdullah Ocalan was inspired by the Maoist theory of people's war. At that time the group sought to create an independent Kurdish Nation State consisting of parts of south-eastern Turkey, north-eastern Iraq, north-eastern Syria and north-western Iran. In 1984, the PKK transformed itself into a paramilitary organization and launched conventional attacks as well as bombings of Turkish governmental installations. In 1999, Turkish authorities captured Öcalan in Kenya. He was tried in Turkey and sentenced to life imprisonment. Since then, the PKK has gone through a series of name and ideological changes. From prison in 2004, Abdullah Ocalan announced the PKK's adoption of a new ideology which he named Jineology (the Science and history of women) radically diverging from the PKK's Marxist-Leninist roots. The ideology proposed the establishment of a system of Democratic confederalism without the existence of a central Nation State government. Women have played a very important role in the development of this ideology during the 1990s and they have also formed an army which is named the YPJ (Women's Protection Units) and its purpose is to defend this new society. Since then, the European Court Of Justice has annulled the decision to classify the PKK as a terrorist group on the grounds that "sufficient arguments were not presented".

=== Europe ===
Founded in 1959 and functioning until 2018, the Euskadi Ta Askatasuna (or ETA - Basque for "Basque Homeland and Freedom", pronounced [ˈeta]) was an armed Basque nationalist separatist organization. Formed in response to the suppression of the Basque language and culture under the régime of General Francisco Franco (in power 1939–1975) in Spain, ETA evolved from an advocacy group for traditional Basque culture into an armed Marxist group demanding Basque independence. Many ETA victims were government officials; the group's first known victim, a police chief, died in 1968. In 1973 ETA operatives killed Franco's apparent successor, Admiral Luis Carrero Blanco, by planting an underground bomb under his habitual parking-spot outside a Madrid church. In 1995 an ETA car-bomb nearly killed José María Aznar, then the leader of the conservative People's Party, and in the same year investigators disrupted a plot to assassinate King Juan Carlos I. Efforts by Spanish governments to negotiate with the ETA failed, and in 2003 the Spanish Supreme Court banned the Batasuna political party, which was determined to be the political arm of ETA.

The Provisional Irish Republican Army (IRA) was an Irish nationalist movement founded in December 1969 when several militants, including Seán Mac Stíofáin, broke off from the Official IRA and formed a new organization. Led by Mac Stíofáin in the early 1970s and by a group around Gerry Adams since the late 1970s, the Provisional IRA sought to bring about an all-island Irish state. Between 1969 and 1997, during a period known as the Troubles, the group conducted an armed campaign, including bombings, gun attacks, assassinations and even a mortar attack on 10 Downing Street. On July 21, 1972, in an attack later dubbed Bloody Friday, the group set off twenty-two bombs, killing nine and injuring 130. On July 28, 2005, the Provisional IRA Army Council announced an end to its armed campaign. The IRA has links with and has provided military training to groups such as the FARC in Colombia and the PLO. In the case of the latter there has been a long-standing solidarity movement, as evidenced by many murals around Belfast.

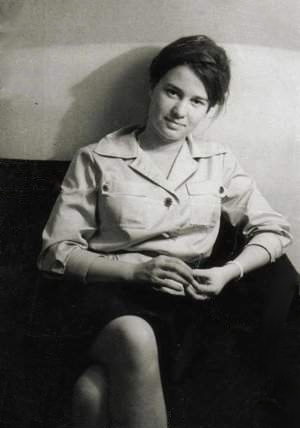
Ulrike Meinhof

The Red Army Faction (RAF) was a New Left group founded in 1968 by Andreas Baader and Ulrike Meinhof in West Germany. Inspired by Che Guevara, Maoist socialism, and the Vietcong, the group sought to raise awareness of the Vietnamese and Palestinian independence movements through kidnappings, taking embassies hostage, bank robberies, assassinations, bombings, and attacks on U.S. Air Force bases. The group became arguably best known for 1977's "German Autumn". The buildup leading to German Autumn began on April 7, when the RAF shot Federal Prosecutor Siegfried Buback. On July 30, it shot Jürgen Ponto, then head of the Dresdner Bank, in a failed kidnapping attempt; on September 5, the group kidnapped Hanns Martin Schleyer (a former SS officer and an important West German industrialist), executing him on October 19. The hijacking of the Lufthansa jetliner "Landshut" in October 1977 by the Popular Front for the Liberation of Palestine, a Palestinian group allied with the Red Army Faction, also forms part of the German Autumn.

The Red Brigades, a New Left group founded by Renato Curcio and Alberto Franceschini in 1970 and based in Italy, sought to create a revolutionary state. The group carried out a series of bombings and kidnappings until the arrests of Curcio and Franceschini in the mid-1970s. Their successor as leader, Mario Moretti, led the group toward more militarized and violent actions, including the kidnapping of former Italian Prime Minister Aldo Moro on March 16, 1978. Moro was killed 56 days later. This led to an all-out assault on the group by Italian law-enforcement and security forces and condemnation from Italian left-wing radicals and even from imprisoned ex-leaders of the Brigades. The group lost most of its social support and public opinion turned strongly against it. In 1984 the group split, the majority faction becoming the Communist Combatant Party (Red Brigades-PCC) and the minority faction reconstituting itself as the Union of Combatant Communists (Red Brigades-UCC). Members of these groups carried out a handful of assassinations before almost all were arrested in 1989.

=== The Americas ===
The Front de libération du Québec (FLQ) was a Marxist Quebec nationalist group that sought to create an independent, socialist Quebec. Georges Schoeters founded the group in 1963 and was inspired by Che Guevara and Algeria's FLN. The group was accused of bombings, kidnappings, and assassinations of politicians, soldiers, and civilians. On October 5, 1970, the FLQ kidnapped James Richard Cross, the British Trade Commissioner, and on October 10, the Minister of Labor and Vice-Premier of Quebec, Pierre Laporte. Laporte was killed a week later. After these events support for violence in order to attain Quebec's independence declined, and support increased for the Parti Québécois, which took power in the 1976 Quebec general election.

In Colombia several paramilitary and guerrilla groups formed during the 1960s and afterwards. In 1983, President Fernando Belaúnde Terry of Peru described armed attacks on his nation's anti-narcotics police as "narcoterrorism", i.e., which refers to "violence waged by drug producers to extract political concessions from the government." Pablo Escobar's ruthless violence in his dealings with the Colombian and Peruvian governments has been probably two of the best known and best documented examples of narcoterrorism. Paramilitary groups associated with narcoterrorism include the Ejército de Liberación Nacional (ELN), the Fuerzas Armadas Revolucionarias de Colombia (FARC), and the Autodefensas Unidas de Colombia (AUC). While the ELN and FARC were originally left wing revolutionary groups and the AUC was originally a right-wing paramilitary, all have conducted numerous attacks on civilians and civilian infrastructure and engaged in the drug trade. The U.S. and some European governments consider them terrorist organizations.

The Jewish Defense League (JDL) was founded in 1969 by Rabbi Meir Kahane in New York City, with its declared purpose being the protection of Jews from harassment and antisemitism. Federal Bureau of Investigation statistics state that, from 1980 to 1985, 15 attacks which the FBI classified as acts of terrorism were attempted in the U.S. by members of the JDL. The National Consortium for the Study of Terror and Responses to Terrorism states that, during the JDL's first two decades of activity, it was an "active terrorist organization.". Kahane later founded the far-right Israeli political party Kach, which was banned from elections in Israel on the ground of racism. The JDL's present-day website condemns all forms of terrorism.

The Fuerzas Armadas de Liberación Nacional (FALN, "Armed Forces of National Liberation") is a nationalist group founded in Puerto Rico in 1974. Over the decade that followed the group used bombings and targeted killings of civilians and police in pursuit of an independent Puerto Rico. The FALN in 1975 took responsibility for four nearly simultaneous bombings in New York City. The United States Federal Bureau of Investigation (FBI) has classified the FALN as a terrorist organization.

The Weather Underground (a.k.a. the Weathermen) began as a militant faction of the leftist Students for a Democratic Society (SDS) organization, and in 1969 took over the organization. Weathermen leaders, inspired by China's Maoists, the Black Panthers, and the 1968 student revolts in France, sought to raise awareness of its revolutionary anti-capitalist and anti-Vietnam War platform by destroying symbols of government power. From 1969 to 1974 the Weathermen bombed corporate offices, police stations, and Washington government sites such as the Pentagon. After the end of the Vietnam War in 1975, most of the group disbanded.

=== Asia ===
The Japanese Red Army was founded by Fusako Shigenobu in Japan in 1971 and attempted to overthrow the Japanese government and start a world revolution. Allied with the Popular Front for the Liberation of Palestine (PFLP), the group committed assassinations, hijacked a commercial Japanese aircraft, and sabotaged a Shell oil refinery in Singapore. On May 30, 1972, Kōzō Okamoto and other group members launched a machine gun and grenade attack at Israel's Lod Airport in Tel Aviv, killing 26 people and injuring 80 others. Two of the three attackers then killed themselves with grenades.

Founded in 1976, the Liberation Tigers of Tamil Eelam, (also called "LTTE" or Tamil Tigers) was a militant Tamil nationalist political and paramilitary organization based in northern Sri Lanka. From its founding by Velupillai Prabhakaran, it waged a secessionist resistance campaign that sought to create an independent Tamil state in the northern and eastern regions of Sri Lanka. The conflict originated in measures the majority Sinhalese took that were perceived as attempts to marginalize the Tamil minority. The resistance campaign evolved into the Sri Lankan Civil War, one of the longest-running armed conflicts in Asia. The group carried out many bombings, including an April 21, 1987, car bomb attack at a Colombo bus terminal that killed 110 people. In 2009 the Sri Lankan military launched a major military offensive against the secessionist movement and claimed that it had effectively destroyed the LTTE.

=== Africa ===
In Kenya, because of the seeming ongoing failure of the Kenyan African Union to obtain political reforms from the British government through peaceful means, radical activists within the KAU set up a splinter group and organised a more militant kind of nationalism. By 1952 the Mau Mau consisted of Kikuyu fighters, along with some Embu and Meru recruits. The Mau Mau carried out attacks on political opponents, loyalist villages, raiding white farms and destroying livestock. The colonial administration declared a state of emergency and British forces were sent to Kenya. The majority of fighting was between loyalist and Mau Mau Kikuyu, so many scholars today now consider it a Kikuyu civil war. The Kenyan Government considers the Mau Mau Uprising a key step towards Kenya's eventual independence in the 1960s. Many Mau Mau members provided reports of torture and abuse suffered by them to foreign journalists, though the British forces did have strict orders not to mistreat Mau Mau terrorists.

Founded in 1961, Umkhonto we Sizwe (MK) was the military wing of the African National Congress; it waged a guerrilla campaign against the South African apartheid regime and was responsible for many bombings. MK launched its first guerrilla attacks against government installations on 16 December 1961. The South African government subsequently banned the group after classifying it as a terrorist organization. MK's first leader was Nelson Mandela, who was tried and imprisoned for the group's acts. With the end of apartheid in South Africa, Umkhonto we Sizwe was incorporated into the South African National Defence Force.

== Late 20th century ==
In the 1980s and 1990s, Islamic militancy in pursuit of religious and political goals increased, many militants drawing inspiration from Iran's 1979 Islamic Revolution. In the 1990s, well-known violent acts that targeted civilians were the World Trade Center bombing by Islamic terrorists on February 26, 1993, the Sarin gas attack on the Tokyo subway by Aum Shinrikyo on March 20, 1995, and the bombing of Oklahoma City's Murrah Federal Building by Timothy McVeigh a month later that same year. This period also saw the rise of what is sometimes categorized as Single issue terrorism. If terrorism is the extension of domestic politics by other means, just as war is for diplomacy, then this represents the extension of pressure groups into violent action. Notable examples that grow in this period are Anti-abortion terrorism and Eco-terrorism.

=== The Americas ===
The Contras were a counter-revolutionary militia formed in 1979 to oppose Nicaragua's Sandinista government. The Catholic Institute for International Relations asserted the following about contra operating procedures in 1987: "The record of the contras in the field... is one of consistent and bloody abuse of human rights, of murder, torture, mutilation, rape, arson, destruction and kidnapping." Americas Watch‍—‌subsequently folded into Human Rights Watch‍—‌accused the Contras of targeting health care clinics and health care workers for assassination; kidnapping civilians, torturing civilians; executing civilians, including children, who were captured in combat; raping women; indiscriminately attacking civilians and civilian houses; seizing civilian property; and burning civilian houses in captured towns. The contras disbanded after the election of Violetta Chamorro in 1990.

The April 19, 1995, Oklahoma City bombing was directed at the U.S. government, according to the prosecutor at the murder trial of Timothy McVeigh, who was convicted of carrying out the crime. The bombing of the Alfred P. Murrah Federal Building in downtown Oklahoma City claimed 168 lives and left over 800 people injured. McVeigh, who was convicted of first degree murder and executed, said his motivation was revenge for U.S. government actions at Waco and Ruby Ridge.

Pyroterrorism is an emerging threat for many areas of dry woodlands.

=== Middle East ===
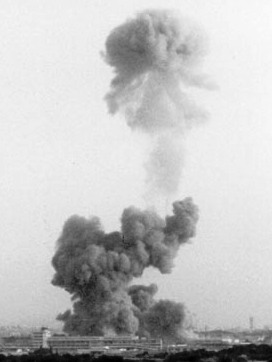
Explosion at U.S. Marine Corps peacekeeping barracks in Beirut, Lebanon, 1983

659 people died in Lebanon between 1982 and 1986 in 36 suicide attacks directed against American, French and Israeli forces, by 41 individuals with predominantly leftist political beliefs who were adherents of both the Christian and Muslim religions. The 1983 Beirut barracks bombing (by the Islamic Jihad Organization), which killed 241 U.S. and 58 French Multinational Force in Lebanon peacekeepers and six civilians at the peacekeeping barracks in Beirut, was particularly deadly. Hezbollah ("Party of God") is an Islamist movement and political party officially founded in Lebanon in 1985, ten years after the outbreak of that country's civil war. Inspired by Ayatollah Ruhollah Khomeini and the Iranian revolution, the group originally sought an Islamic revolution in Lebanon and has long fought for the withdrawal of Israeli forces from Lebanon. Led by Sheikh Sayyed Hassan Nasrallah since 1992, the group has captured Israeli soldiers and carried out missile attacks and suicide bombings against Israeli targets.

Egyptian Islamic Jihad (a.k.a. Al-Gamaa Al-Islamiyya) is a militant Egyptian Islamist movement dedicated to the establishment of an Islamic state in Egypt. The group was formed in 1980 as an umbrella organization for militant student groups which were formed after the leadership of the Muslim Brotherhood renounced violence. It is led by Omar Abdel-Rahman, who has been accused of participation in the 1993 World Trade Center bombing. In 1981, the group assassinated Egyptian president Anwar Sadat. On November 17, 1997, in what became known as the Luxor massacre, it attacked tourists at the Mortuary Temple of Hatshepsut (Deir el-Bahri); six men dressed as police officers machine-gunned 58 Japanese and European vacationers and four Egyptians.

Nose section of Pan Am Flight 103

On December 21, 1988, Pan Am Flight 103, a Pan American World Airways flight from London's Heathrow International Airport to New York City's John F. Kennedy International Airport, was destroyed mid flight over the Scottish town of Lockerbie, killing 270 people, including 11 on the ground. On January 31, 2001, Libyan Abdelbaset al-Megrahi was convicted by a panel of three Scottish judges of bombing the flight, and was sentenced to 27 years imprisonment. In 2002, Libya offered financial compensation to victims' families in exchange for lifting of UN and U.S. sanctions. In 2007 Megrahi was granted leave to appeal against his conviction, and in August 2009 was released on compassionate grounds by the Scottish Government due to his terminal cancer.

The first Palestinian suicide attack took place in 1989 when a member of the Palestinian Islamic Jihad ignited a bomb onboard Tel Aviv bus, killing 16 people. In the early 1990s another group, Hamas, also became well known for suicide bombings. Sheikh Ahmed Yassin, Abdel Aziz al-Rantissi and Mohammad Taha of the Palestinian wing of Egypt's Muslim Brotherhood had created Hamas in 1987, at the beginning of the First Intifada, an uprising against Israeli rule in the Palestinian Territories which mostly consisted of civil disobedience but sometimes escalated into violence. Hamas's militia, the Izz ad-Din al-Qassam Brigades, began its own suicide bombings against Israel in 1993, eventually accounting for about 40% of them. Palestinian militant organizations have been responsible for rocket attacks on Israel, IED attacks, shootings, and stabbings. After winning legislative elections, Hamas since June 2007 has governed the Gaza portion of the Palestinian Territories. Hamas is designated as a terrorist organization by the European Union, Canada, Israel, Japan, and the United States. Australia and the United Kingdom have designated the military wing of Hamas, the Izz ad-Din al-Qassam Brigades, as a terrorist organization. The organization is banned in Jordan.It is not regarded as a terrorist organization by Iran, Russia, Norway, Switzerland, Brazil, Turkey, China, and Qatar. As well as Hamas, the Popular Front for the Liberation of Palestine, Palestinian Islamic Jihad, Palestinian Liberation Front, PFLP-General Command, and the Al-Aqsa Martyrs Brigade were all listed as terrorist organizations by the US State Department in the 1990s.

On February 25, 1994, Baruch Goldstein, an American-born Israeli physician, perpetrated the Cave of the Patriarchs massacre in the city of Hebron, Goldstein shot and killed between 30 and 54 Muslim worshippers inside the Ibrahimi Mosque (within the Cave of the Patriarchs), and wounded another 125 to 150. Goldstein, who after the shooting was found beaten to death with iron bars in the mosque, was a supporter of Kach, an Israeli political party founded by Rabbi Meir Kahane that advocated the expulsion of Arabs from Israel and the Palestinian Territories. In the aftermath of the Goldstein attack and Kach statements praising it, Kach was outlawed in Israel. Today, Kach and a breakaway group, Kahane Chai, are considered terrorist organisations by Israel, Canada, the European Union, and the United States. The far-right anti-miscegenation group Lehava, headed by former Kach member Bentzi Gopstein, is politically active inside Israel and its occupied territories.

=== Asia ===
Aum Shinrikyo, now known as Aleph, was a Japanese religious group founded by Shoko Asahara in 1984 as a yogic meditation group. Later, in the 1990 Japanese general election, Asahara and 24 other members campaigned for election to the House of Representatives under the banner of Shinri-tō (Supreme Truth Party). None were voted in, and the group began to militarize. Between 1990 and 1995, the group attempted several apparently unsuccessful violent attacks using the methods of biological warfare, using botulin toxin and anthrax spores. On June 28, 1994, Aum Shinrikyo members released sarin gas from several sites in the Kaichi Heights neighborhood of Matsumoto, Japan, killing eight and injuring 200 in what became known as the Matsumoto incident. Seven months later, on March 20, 1995, Aum Shinrikyo members released sarin gas in a coordinated attack on five trains in the Tokyo subway system, killing 12 commuters and damaging the health of about 5,000 others in what became known as the subway sarin incident (地下鉄サリン事件, chikatetsu sarin jiken). In May 1995, Asahara and other senior leaders were arrested and the group's membership rapidly decreased.

In 1985, Air India Flight 182 flying from Canada was blown up by a bomb while in Irish airspace, killing 329 people, including 280 Canadian citizens, mostly of Indian birth or descent, and 22 Indians. The incident was the deadliest act of air terrorism before 9/11, and the first bombing of a Boeing 747 which would set a pattern for future air terrorism plots. The crash occurred within an hour of the fatal Narita Airport Bombing which also originated from Canada without the passenger for the bag that exploded on the ground. Evidence from the explosions, witnesses and wiretaps of militants pointed to an attempt to actually blow up two airliners simultaneously by members of the Babbar Khalsa Khalistan movement militant group based in Canada to punish India for attacking the Golden Temple.

=== Europe ===
The Iranian Embassy siege took place in 1980, after a group of six armed men stormed the Iranian embassy in South Kensington, London. The government ordered the Special Air Service (SAS), a special forces regiment of the British Army, to conduct an assault—Operation Nimrod—to rescue the remaining hostages. This response set the tone for how Western governments would respond to terrorism, replacing an era of negotiation with one of military intervention.

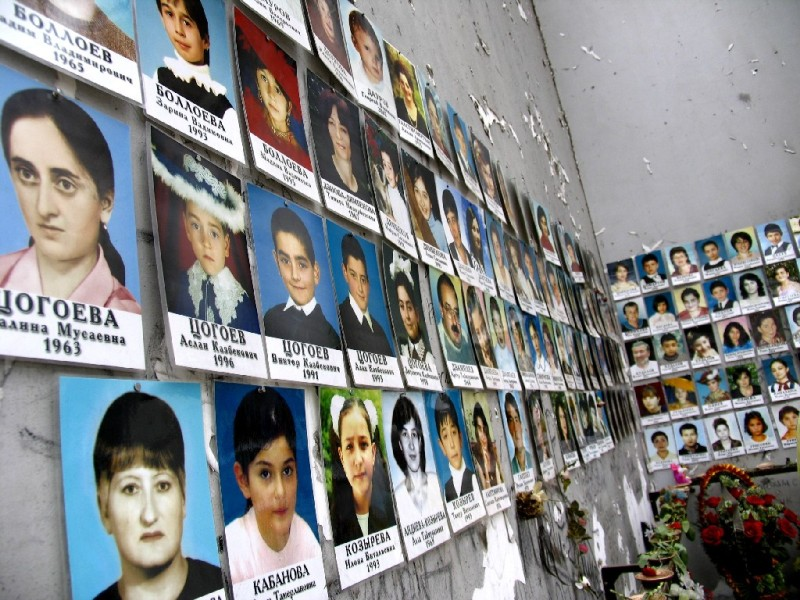
Hostage crisis victim photos, on the walls of the former School Number One

Chechen separatists, led by Shamil Basayev, carried out several attacks on Russian targets between 1994 and 2006. In the June 1995 Budyonnovsk hospital hostage crisis, Basayev-led separatists took over 1,000 civilians hostage in a hospital in the southern Russian city of Budyonnovsk. When Russian special forces attempted to free the hostages, 105 civilians and 25 Russian troops were killed.

== 21st century ==
Major events - most deadly (300 deaths or more) or most covered - after the 2001 September 11 attacks include the 2002 Akshardham temple attack, 2002 Moscow Theatre Siege, the 2003 Istanbul bombings, the 2004 Madrid train bombings, the 2004 Beslan school hostage crisis, the 2005 London bombings, the 2005 New Delhi bombings, the 2007 Yazidi communities bombings, the 2008 Mumbai Hotel Siege, the 2009 Makombo massacre, the 2011 Norway attacks, the 2013 Iraq attacks, the 2014 Camp Speicher massacre, the 2014 Gamboru Ngala attack, the 2015 Paris attacks, the 2016 Karrada bombing, the 2016 Mosul massacre, the 2016 Hamam al-Alil massacre, the 2017 Mogadishu bombings, the 2017 Sinai attack and the October 7 attacks.

In the 21st century, most victims of terrorist attacks have been killed in Iraq, Afghanistan, Nigeria, Syria, Pakistan, India, Somalia or Yemen.

=== Europe ===
The Moscow theatre hostage crisis was the seizure of a crowded Moscow theatre on 23 October 2002 by some 40 to 50 armed Chechens who claimed allegiance to the Islamist militant separatist movement in Chechnya. They took 850 hostages and demanded the withdrawal of Russian forces from Chechnya and an end to the Second Chechen War. The siege was officially led by Movsar Barayev. After a two-and-a-half-day siege, Russian Spetsnaz forces pumped an unknown chemical agent (thought to be fentanyl, 3-methylfentanyl), into the building's ventilation system and raided it. Officially, 39 of the attackers were killed by Russian forces, along with at least 129 and possibly many more of the hostages (including nine foreigners). All but a few of the hostages who died were killed by the gas pumped into the theatre, and many condemned the use of the gas as heavy handed. Roughly, 170 people died in all.

On September 1, 2004, in what became known as the Beslan school hostage crisis, 32 Chechen separatists took 1,300 children and adults hostage at Beslan's School Number One. When Russian authorities did not comply with the rebel demands that Russian forces withdraw from Chechnya, 20 adult male hostages were shot. After two days of stalled negotiations, Russian special forces stormed the building. In the ensuing melee, over 300 hostages died, along with 19 Russian servicemen and all but perhaps one of the rebels. Basayev is believed to have participated in organizing the attack..

The 2004 Madrid train bombings (also known in Spain as 11-M) were nearly simultaneous, coordinated bombings against the Cercanías commuter train system of Madrid, Spain, on the morning of 11 March 2004‍—‌three days before Spain's general elections and two and a half years after the September 11 attacks in the United States. The explosions killed 191 people and wounded 1,800. It was concluded that the bombs were carried on the trains hidden in backpacks, While many went off three were found later that did not detonate. The official investigation by the Spanish judiciary found that the attacks were directed by a al-Qaeda-inspired terrorist cell. ETA and al Qaeda were the original suspects cited by the Spanish government.

The 7 July 2005 London bombings (often referred to as 7/7) were a series of coordinated suicide bomb attacks in central London which targeted civilians using the public transport system during the morning rush hour. On the morning of Thursday, 7 July 2005, four Islamist extremists separately detonated three bombs in quick succession aboard London Underground trains across the city and, later, a fourth on a double-decker bus in Tavistock Square. Fifty-two civilians were killed and over 700 more were injured in the attacks. Later a dozen unexploded bombs were found in a car located in North London. 3 out of the 4 suspects were identified Mohammed Silique Khan, Germaine Morris Lindsay, Shahzad Tawnier where they are found to be in cohorts with Osama Bin Laden and eventually documents are leaked showing that Osama bin laden and Rashid Ruff planned the London bombings.

In Norway in 2011 two sequential lone wolf terrorist attacks by right-wing extremist Anders Behring Breivik were carried out against the government, the civilian population, and a Workers' Youth League (AUF)-run summer camp in Norway on 22 July 2011. The attacks claimed a total of 77 lives. The first part of the attack was a van bomb in Oslo. The van was placed in front of the office block housing the office of Prime Minister and other government buildings. The explosion killed eight people and injured at least 209 people, twelve of them seriously. He followed this attack by impersonating a police officer to access the island on which the AUF summer camp was being held and proceeded to go on a shooting spree that killed 69 people.

In 2013 the British government branded the killing of a serviceman in a Woolwich street, a terrorist attack. One of his attackers made political statements which were later broadcast with blood still on his hands from the attack. The two men responsible for the attack remained on the scene until incapacitated by armed police. They were later tried and found guilty of murder.

The Je suis Charlie ("I am Charlie") slogan became an endorsement of freedom of speech and press

From 7 January to 9 January 2015, a series of five terrorist attacks occurred across the Île-de-France region, particularly in Paris. The attacks killed a total of 17 people, in addition to the three perpetrators of the attack, and wounded 22 others, some of whom are in critical condition as of 16 January 2015. A fifth shooting attack did not result in any fatalities. Numerous other smaller incidents of attacks on mosques have been reported, but have not yet been directly linked to the attacks. The group that claims responsibility for the attacks, Al-Qaeda in the Arabian Peninsula, claimed that the attack had been planned for years ahead.

On 7 January 2015, two Islamist gunmen forced their way into and opened fire in the Paris headquarters of Charlie Hebdo shooting, killing twelve: staff cartoonists Charb, Cabu, Philippe Honoré, Tignous and Georges Wolinski, economist Bernard Maris, editors Elsa Cayat and Mustapha Ourrad, guest Michel Renaud, maintenance worker Frédéric Boisseau and police officers Brinsolaro and Merabet, and wounding eleven, four of them seriously.

During the attack, the gunmen shouted "Allahu akbar" ("God is great" in Arabic) and also "the Prophet is avenged". President François Hollande described it as a "terrorist attack of the most extreme barbarity". The two gunmen were identified as Saïd Kouachi and Chérif Kouachi, French Muslim brothers of Algerian descent.

On 9 January, police tracked the assailants to an industrial estate in Dammartin-en-Goële, where they took a hostage. Another gunman also shot a police officer on 8 January and took hostages the next day, at a kosher supermarket near the Porte de Vincennes. GIGN (a special operations unit of the French Armed Forces), combined with RAID and BRI (special operations units of the French Police), conducted simultaneous raids in Dammartin and at Porte de Vincennes. Three terrorists were killed, along with four hostages who died in the Vincennes supermarket before the intervention; some other hostages were injured.

On 13 November, 28 hours after the Beirut attack, three groups of ISIS terrorists performed mass killings in various places in Paris' Xe and XIe arrondissements. They killed a total of more than 130 citizens. Hostages were taken in the concert hall "Le Bataclan" for three hours, and ninety were killed before the special police entered. President François Hollande immediately started the emergency threat procedure, for the first time on the entire French territory since the Algeria events in 1960.

On the morning of 22 March 2016, three coordinated suicide bombings occurred in Belgium: two at Brussels Airport in Zaventem, and one at Maalbeek metro station in central Brussels. They are referred to as the 2016 Brussels attacks. Thirty-two civilians and three perpetrators were killed, and more than 300 people were injured. Another bomb was found during a search of the airport. The Islamic State of Iraq and the Levant (ISIL) claimed responsibility for the attacks.

On 22 May 2017 a suicide bomber attacked Manchester Arena during an Ariana Grande concert. Twenty-three people died, including the attacker, and 139 were wounded, more than half of them children.

=== Middle East ===
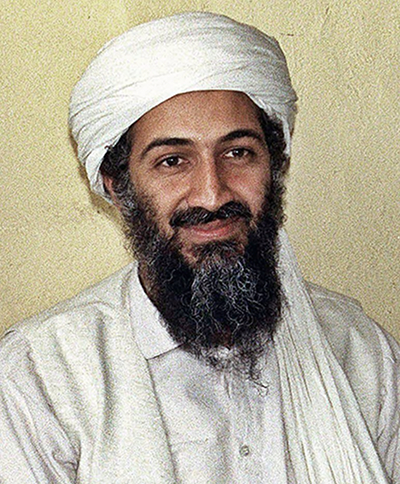
Osama bin Laden

Osama bin Laden, closely advised by Egyptian Islamic Jihad leader Ayman al-Zawahiri, in 1988 founded Al-Qaeda (Arabic: القاعدة, meaning "The Base"), an Islamic jihadist movement to replace Western-controlled or dominated Muslim countries with Islamic fundamentalist regimes. In pursuit of that goal, bin Laden issued a 1996 manifesto that vowed violent jihad against U.S. Armed Forces based in Saudi Arabia. On August 7, 1998, individuals associated with Al Qaeda and Egyptian Islamic Jihad carried out simultaneous bombings of two U.S. embassies in Africa which resulted in 224 deaths. On October 12, 2000, Al-Qaeda carried out the USS Cole bombing, a suicide bombing of the U.S. Navy destroyer USS Cole harbored in the Yemeni port of Aden. The bombing killed seventeen U.S. sailors.

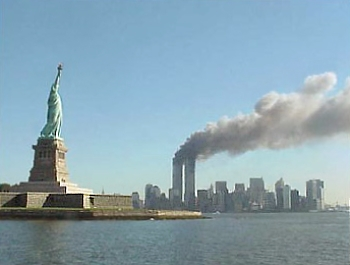
September 11, 2001‍—‌The towers of the World Trade Center burn

On September 11, 2001, nineteen men affiliated with al-Qaeda hijacked four commercial passenger jets all bound for California, crashing two of them into the World Trade Center in New York City, the third into the Pentagon in Arlington County, Virginia, and the fourth (originally intended to target Washington, D.C., either the White House or the U.S. Capitol) into an open field near Shanksville, Pennsylvania, after a revolt by the plane's passengers. As a result of the attacks, 2,996 people (including the 19 hijackers) perished and more than 6,000 others were injured.

The United States responded to the attacks by launching the war on terror. Specifically, on October 7, 2001, it invaded Afghanistan to depose the Taliban, which had harbored al-Qaeda terrorists. On October 26, 2001, the U.S. enacted the Patriot Act that expanded the powers of U.S. law enforcement and intelligence agencies. Many countries followed with similar legislation. Under the Obama administration, the U.S. changed tactics moving away from ground combat with large numbers of troops, to the use of drones and special forces. This campaign eliminated much of al-Qaeda's most senior members, including a strike by Seal Team Six that resulted in the death of Osama Bin Laden in 2011.

On Israel's northern border, after its unilateral withdrawal from southern Lebanon in May 2000, Hezbollah launched numerous Katyusha rocket attacks against non-civilian and civilian areas within northern Israel. Within Israel, the 1993–2008 Second Intifada involved in part a series of suicide bombings against civilian and non-civilian targets. 1100 Israelis were killed in the Second Intifada, the majority being civilians. A 2007 study of Palestinian suicide bombings from September 2000 through August 2005 found that 40% percent were carried out by Hamas's Izz ad-Din al-Qassam Brigades, and roughly 26% by the Palestinian Islamic Jihad (PIJ) and Fatah militias. Also, between 2001 and January 2009, over 8,600 rocket attacks were launched from the Gaza Strip were launched into civilian areas and non-civilian areas inside Israel, causing deaths, injuries, and psychological trauma. Formed in 2003, Jundallah is a Sunni insurgent group from Iranian Balochistan and neighboring Pakistan. It has committed numerous attacks within Iran, stating that it is fighting for the rights of the Sunni minority there. In 2005 the group attempted to assassinate Iran's president, Mahmoud Ahmadinejad. The group takes credit for other bombings, including the 2007 Zahedan bombings. Iran and other sources accuse the group of being a front for or supported by other nations, in particular the U.S. and Pakistan.

As the Islamic State of Iraq and the Levant increases in size and power their attacks are affecting all parts of the world even in their own back yard of Turkey. Taking place in Istanbul a suicide bomber once again detonated a car bomb killing 4 people and injuring 31. No extremist group took responsibility for the attack but the attacker Mehmet Ozturk was linked to have ties with ISIS. This was just days after the car bomb attack in Turkey's capital of Ankara killing 37 people. The United States National Security Council asked for the repeated terror attacks on Turkey to stop, and that the war on terror will just become stronger due actions like these killing innocent people. Since the attacks Israel has requested that its citizens not travel to Turkey unless its necessary.

=== Asia ===
On December 27, 2007, two time elected Pakistani Prime Minister Benazir Bhutto was assassinated during a gathering she was having with her supporters while campaigning for the 2008 Pakistani general election. A suicide bomber detonated a bomb along with other extremists against her shooting off guns killing the prime minister and 14 other people. She was immediately rushed to the hospital and was pronounced dead. She was believed to be target because she was warning Pakistan along with the world of the uprising Jihadist groups and extremist groups gaining power. The responsibility of her death falls on the president of the time Pervez Musharraf who also was the former Chairman Joint Chiefs of Staff Committee of the Pakistan Armed Forces. She had several conversations with Musharraf about upping her security due to the increase of death threats she was receiving and he denied her request. Although Al-Qaeda took responsibility for her death it is seen in the eye of the people as Musharraf's fault for not taking her concerns seriously. However, during his trial he denies that no conversation happened between him and Bhutto about the security of her life.

The 2008 Mumbai attacks were more than ten coordinated shooting and bombing attacks across Mumbai, India's largest city, by Lashkar-e-Taiba, a Pakistani Islamic terrorist organization with ties to ISI, Pakistan's secret service. The six main targets were

1. Chhatrapati Shivaji Terminus – formerly known as Victoria Station
2. The Taj Mahal Palace and Tower Hotel – six explosions were reported in the hotel,200 hostages were rescued from the burning building. A group of European Parliament committee members were staying at the hotel at the time but none were injured. Two attackers held hostages in the hotel.
3. Leopold Café – a popular cafe and bar on the Causeway that was one of the first places to be attacked resulting in the death of 10 people
4. The Trident-Oberoi Hotel – one explosion was heard here where the President of Madrid was eating, he was not injured
5. Nariman House, a Jewish community center – had a hostage situation by two attackers eventually the hostages became freed when an aerial view of the building was displayed and NSG's stormed the building eventually killing the two attackers.
6. Cama Hospital – the attacks were carried out by 10 gunman that arrived on speed boats from Pakistan, separating going building to building grabbing hostages, setting bombs up and mass murdering with guns. Eventually 9 out of the 10 gunman were killed. Pakistan denied that the men were a part of their country but eventually released documents that 3 of the men were from Pakistan and that cases would be opened against them

The attacks, which drew widespread condemnation across the world, began on 26 November 2008 and lasted until 29 November, killing at least 173 people and wounding at least 308.

On January 14, 2016, a series of terrorist attacks took place in Jakarta, Indonesia resulting in 8 dead. The responsibility of these attacks were claimed by ISIS. Counter terrorism has named this type of attack 'Marauding Terrorist Firearms Attack' because of the fast reaction needed by local policemen to stop the gunfire attack from the terrorists. The attack on Jakarta is linked to a bigger picture of terror in the Indonesian country for those of ISIS. Indonesia is home of the "largest regional terror groups" housing seven Islamist extremist groups. Leaving the thoughts that ISIS is trying to establish a satellite city in Indonesia, due to the fact that it has the largest Muslim population. Although ISIS branches have not yet reached the land of Southeast Asia in big masses, there is the fear that it is only a matter of time until Indonesias small extremist groups grow in masses once direct contact with ISIS is made. Once contact is established local terror groups will quickly mobilize to carry out the tasks that ISIS asks of them. ISIS will turn to Southeast Asia because it is only evident that they will lose control of the middle east.

=== Americas ===
2001 also saw the second acknowledged act of bioterrorism with the 2001 anthrax attacks (the first being intentional food poisoning conducted in The Dalles, Oregon by Rajneeshee followers in 1984), when letters carrying anthrax spores were posted to several major American media outlets and two Democratic Party politicians. This resulted in several of the first fatalities attributed to a bioterror attack.

Recent years have seen an increase in racially motivated violence, including the Charlottesville car attack during the 2017 Unite the Right rally, and the shooting of multiple black parishioners at Emanuel African Methodist Episcopal Church in Charleston, South Carolina. More recent terrorist attacks in the United States have included the 2015 San Bernardino attack, the Boston Marathon Bombing, and the 2016 shooting of Dallas police officers. There have been calls by some analysts to describe violence committed by incels as terrorism.

== List of non-state groups accused of engaging in terrorism ==
Name	Location	Founded	Ceased attacks	Founder	Subsequent leaders	Ideology	Conflict	Tactics	Famous attack	Influenced by	Accused of terrorism by
Fenians	United Kingdom of Great Britain and Ireland	1858		James Stephens John O'Mahony		Irish republicanism Irish nationalism	Fenian raids Fenian Rising		Young Ireland rebellion, 1848		Government of the United Kingdom
Ku Klux Klan	United States	1865		Nathan Bedford Forrest	William Joseph Simmons Hiram Wesley Evans James A. Colescott Samuel Green Roy Elonza Davis	White supremacy White nationalism Nordicism Segregationism Christian fundamentalism Nativism Neo-Confederatism Anti-Catholicism Radical right Social conservatism	Reconstruction era Nadir of American race relations Mass racial violence in the United States	Lynchings, race riots, assassinations			
Narodnaya Volya	Russian Empire	1878	1883			Populism; Agrarian socialism		bombings, assassinations	Assassinated Tsar Alexander II, 1881		
Hunchakian Revolutionary Party	Ottoman Empire	1887	1896	Avetis Nazarbekian		Armenian nationalism Democratic socialism Russophilia	Armenian national movement		Destroyed Ottoman coat of arms, 1890	Narodnaya Volya	
Armenian Revolutionary Federation	Ottoman Empire	1890	1897	Christapor Mikaelian		Armenian nationalism Democratic socialism	Armenian national movement		Held hostages at Ottoman Bank, 1896	Hunchakian Revolutionary Party	
Internal Macedonian Revolutionary Organization	Ottoman Empire	1893	1903	Hristo Tatarchev		Macedonian nationalism	Ilinden-Preobrazhenie uprising Balkan Wars World War I		Led Ilinden–Preobrazhenie Uprising, 1903	Narodnaya Volya	
Women's Social and Political Union	United Kingdom of Great Britain and Ireland	1903	1914	Emmeline Pankhurst	Christabel Pankhurst	First-wave feminism Women's suffrage in the United Kingdom	Suffragette bombing and arson campaign	Letter bombing, bombing and arson	Burning of Portsmouth Naval Dockyard, 1913		Government of the United Kingdom
Irish Republican Army	United Kingdom Ireland	1916	1950s	Éamon de Valera	Michael Collins	Irish republicanism Irish nationalism Irish irredentism Anti-British sentiment	Easter Rising Irish War of Independence Irish Civil War Northern Campaign (Irish Republican Army)		Kilmichael Ambush, 1920	Irish Republican Brotherhood; Women's Social and Political Union	Government of the United Kingdom
Irgun	Mandatory Palestine	1931	1948	Avraham Tehomi	Menachem Begin	Revisionist Zionism	Jewish insurgency in Mandatory Palestine 1947–1949 Palestine war	bombings	King David Hotel bombing, 1946	Irish Republican Army	British Colonial Office
Lehi	Mandatory Palestine	1940	1948	Abraham Stern	Yitzhak Shamir	Revisionist Zionism	Jewish insurgency in Mandatory Palestine 1947–1949 Palestine war	assassinations	Lord Moyne assassination, 1944	Irish Republican Army	British Colonial Office
Muslim Brotherhood	Egypt	1928		Hassan al-Banna		Islamism Neo-Sufism Religious conservatism		assassinations	Assassinated former PM Mahmud Fahmi al-Nuqrashi, 1948		British Colonial Office
Front de Liberation National	French Algeria	1954	1962	Ahmed Ben Bella Mohamed Boudiaf Hocine Aït Ahmed		Algerian nationalism Arab socialism Anti-imperialism	Algerian War		Toussaint Rouge attacks, 1954	Indochina rebels	French Government
EOKA	British Cyprus	1955	1959	George Grivas		Enosis Greek Cypriot nationalism Anti-imperialism	Cyprus Emergency				
ETA	Spain	1959	2018		Josu Urrutikoetxea	Basque nationalism Revolutionary socialism Anti-Spanish sentiment	Basque conflict	bombings, assassinations	Assassinated "President" Blanco, 1978		Spanish Government
Fatah	Israel Palestine	1959		Yasser Arafat	Mahmoud Abbas	Palestinian nationalism Social democracy	Israeli–Palestinian conflict		Munich Olympics massacre, 1972	Algerian rebels	Israeli Government
Palestine Liberation Organization	Israel Palestine	1964		Ahmad Shukeiri	Yasser Arafat Mahmoud Abbas	Palestinian nationalism Secularism	Israeli–Palestinian conflict		1978 Coastal Road massacre		Israeli Government
PFLP	Israel Palestine	1967		George Habash	Ahmad Sa'adat	Palestinian nationalism Marxism–Leninism Anti-Zionism Pan-Arab nationalism One-state solution	Israeli–Palestinian conflict		Black September skyjacking, 1970	Che Guevara	Israeli Government
PFLP-GC	Israel Palestine	1968		Ahmed Jibril		Palestinian nationalism	Israeli–Palestinian conflict		Hangglider shooting, 1970		Israeli Government
DFLP	Israel Palestine	1969		Nayef Hawatmeh		Palestinian nationalism Communism Anti-Zionism Left-wing nationalism	Israeli–Palestinian conflict		Avivim school bus massacre, 1970		Israeli Government
United Klans of America	United States	1960		Robert Shelton		White supremacy Radical right Nordicism Segregationism Christian fundamentalism	Mass racial violence in the United States		16th Street Baptist Church bombing		
Azanian People's Liberation Army	South Africa	1961	1994	Potlako Leballo		Black nationalism Pan-Africanism African socialism Anti-racism	Internal resistance to apartheid				Government of South Africa
UMkhonto we Sizwe	South Africa	1961	1994	Nelson Mandela		African nationalism Anti-apartheid Anti-racism	Internal resistance to apartheid Rhodesian Bush War Angolan Civil War				Government of South Africa
Front de libération du Québec	Canada	1963	1971	Georges Schoeters		Quebec separatism Quebec nationalism Marxism–Leninism Anti-Canadian sentiment	Quiet Revolution October Crisis	bombings, kidnappings, assassinations	October Crisis kidnappings, 1970	Che Guevara; the FLN	Canadian Government
Organisation armée secrète	France French Algeria	1961	1962	Raoul Salan Edmond Jouhaud Yves Godard Jean-Jacques Susini		French nationalism Colonialism Far-right	Algerian War				
Balochistan Liberation Army	Afghanistan Pakistan	1964		Khair Bakhsh Marri		Baloch nationalism	Insurgency in Balochistan				
People's Mojahedin Organization of Iran	Iran	1965			Massoud and Maryam Rajavi						Government of Iran
Grey Wolves	Turkey	1968		Alparslan Türkeş		Turkish nationalism Neo-fascism Islamism	Political violence in Turkey (1976–1980)				
Provisional IRA	United Kingdom Ireland	1969	2005	Seán Mac Stíofáin		Irish republicanism Irish nationalism Irish irredentism Anti-British sentiment	Provisional Irish Republican Army campaign The Troubles	bombings, assassinations	Bloody Friday bombings, 1972		Government of the United Kingdom Government of Ireland
Shining Path	Peru	1969		Abimael Guzmán		Marxism-Leninism-Maoism Gonzalo Thought Anti-revisionism	Internal conflict in Peru				
Ulster Defence Association (UDA)	United Kingdom Ireland	1972		Billy Hull Jim Anderson	Johnny Adair	Ulster loyalism Ulster Protestantism Irish unionism Anti-Catholicism	The Troubles	assassinations, mass shootings	Castlerock killings, 1993 & Greysteel massacre, 1993	Ulster Unionist Party (UUP), Democratic Unionist Party (DUP)	Government of the United Kingdom Government of Ireland
Ulster Volunteer Force (UVF)	United Kingdom Ireland	1966		Gusty Spence		Ulster loyalism Ulster Protestantism Irish unionism Anti-Catholicism	The Troubles	assassinations, bombings	Dublin and Monaghan Bombings, 1974 & Loughinisland massacre, 1994	Ulster Unionist Party (UUP)	Government of the United Kingdom Government of Ireland
Fuerzas Armadas de Liberación Nacional Puertorriqueña	United States Puerto Rico	1974		Filiberto Ojeda Ríos		Puerto Rican nationalism Anti-Americanism Revolutionary socialism	Independence movement in Puerto Rico	bombings	Four NYC bombs, 1975		Government of the United States
Armenian Secret Army for the Liberation of Armenia	Turkey	1975	1986	Hagop Tarakchian		Armenian nationalism Anti-Turkish sentiment	Armenian–Turkish Conflict		Attack on Ankara airport, 1982		Turkish Government
Kurdistan Workers' Party	Turkey	1978		Abdullah Öcalan		Kurdish nationalism Democratic confederalism Jineology Socialism	Kurdish–Turkish conflict		Başbağlar massacre	Mao Zedong; FLN	Turkish Government
Revolutionary Armed Forces of Colombia	Colombia	1964	2017	Efraín Guzmán Jacobo Arenas	Manuel Marulanda Alfonso Cano Timoleón Jiménez	Guevarism Left-wing nationalism Bolivarianism Agrarian socialism Anti-imperialism	Colombian conflict				Government of Colombia
National Liberation Army	Colombia	1964		Antonio Garcia		Marxism–Leninism Liberation theology	Colombian conflict				Government of Colombia
Red Army Faction	West Germany	1968	1998	Andreas Baader Ulrike Meinhof		Marxism Anti-capitalism Anti-fascism	German Autumn		German Autumn killings, 1977	Che Guevara; Mao Zedong; Vietcong	German Government
Weathermen	United States	1969	1977	Bill Ayers Bernardine Dohrn		New Left Opposition to the Vietnam War Black Power			Chicago police statue bombing, 1969	Mao Zedong; Black Panthers	
Italian Red Brigade	Italy	1970	1989	Renato Curcio	Margherita Cagol Alberto Franceschini	Marxism–Leninism Anti-capitalism Anti-fascism	Years of Lead		Assassinated former Prime Minister Aldo Moro, 1978		
Japanese Red Army	Japan	1971	2001	Fusako Shigenobu		Maoism Anti-imperialism Anti-fascism Anti-monarchism			Lod Airport Massacre, 1972		
Tamil Tigers	Sri Lanka	1976	2009	Velupillai Prabhakaran		Tamil nationalism Revolutionary socialism	Sri Lankan Civil War		Columbus bus terminal bombing, 1987		Government of Sri Lanka
Hezbollah	Lebanon	1982			Hassan Nasrallah	Lebanese nationalism Pan-Islamism Khomeinism Anti-Zionism Anti-Western sentiment	Lebanese Civil War Israeli–Lebanese conflict Syrian civil war		April 1983 U.S. Embassy bombing, 1983 Beirut barracks bombing	Ayatollah Ruhollah Khomeini	Israeli Government
Egyptian Islamic Jihad	Egypt	1980		Muhammad abd-al-Salam Faraj	Omar Abdel-Rahman	Qutbism			Assassination of Anwar Sadat, 1981 Luxor massacre, 1997		Government of Egypt
Jewish Defense League	Israel	1980		Meir Kahane		Kahanism Zionism Anti-Arabism					
Hamas	Gaza Strip	1987		Sheikh Ahmed Yassin	Ismail Haniyeh	Palestinian nationalism Islamism Antisemitism Anti-Western sentiment	Gaza–Israel conflict Fatah–Hamas conflict		October 7 attacks, 2023 Passover massacre, 2002 Sbarro restaurant suicide bombing, 2001	Muslim Brotherhood	Israeli Government
al-Qaeda	Saudi Arabia	1988		Osama bin Laden	Ayman al-Zawahiri	Pan-Islamism Salafi jihadism Anti-Western sentiment	Afghan conflict Somali Civil War War on terror Iraqi conflict Yemeni crisis Libyan Crisis Syrian civil war Insurgency in the Maghreb Mali War		9/11 attacks, 2001	Mujahideen	
East Turkestan Liberation Organization	China	1990				Uyghur nationalism East Turkestan separatism Turanism Islamism Anti-communism Anti-Chinese sentiment	Xinjiang conflict				Government of China
Aum Shinrikyo	Japan	1990	1995	Shoko Asahara		Japanese new religions Religious extremism Buddhism Millenarianism			Sarin gas attack on the Tokyo subway, 1995		
Lashkar-e-Taiba	Pakistan	1991		Hafiz Saeed		Islamism Ahl-i Hadith Anti-Hindu sentiment	Indo-Pakistani wars Kashmir conflict		Mumbai train bombings, 2006 and 2008 Mumbai attacks.		Government of India
Chechnyan Separatists	Russia	1994		Dokka Umarov	Shamil Basayev	Salafi jihadism Pan-Islamism	Chechen–Russian conflict Insurgency in the North Caucasus		Beslan school hostage crisis, 2004		Government of Russia
United Self-Defense Forces of Colombia	Colombia	1997	2006	Carlos Castaño Gil		Far-right Anti-labor Anti-communism	Colombian conflict				
Jundallah	Iran	2003		Abdolmalek Rigi	Muhammad Dhahir Baluch	Salafi jihadism Baloch nationalism Anti-Iranian sentiment	Kurdish-Iranian conflict		Zahedan bombings, 2007		Government of Iran
Jama'at al-Tawhid wal-Jihad Al-Qaeda in Iraq Islamic State of Iraq Islamic State of Iraq and the Levant	Iraq Syria Afghanistan Libya Afghanistan Nigeria Somalia	1999		Abu Musab al-Zarqawi	Abu Omar al-Baghdadi Abu Bakr al-Baghdadi Abu Ibrahim al-Hashimi al-Qurashi Abu al-Hasan al-Hashimi al-Qurashi	Islamism Salafi jihadism Wahhabism Anti-Yazidi sentiment Anti-Christian sentiment Anti-Western sentiment Anti-Shia sentiment Antisemitism	Iraqi conflict Syrian civil war Libyan Crisis Yemeni crisis Afghanistan conflict Sinai insurgency War on terror Somali Civil War Boko Haram insurgency ISIL insurgency in Tunisia				United Nations
Boko Haram	Nigeria	2002		Mohammed Yusuf	Abubakar Shekau	Islamism Salafi jihadism Wahhabism Anti-Christian sentiment Anti-Western sentiment	Boko Haram insurgency				Government of Nigeria
Al-Shabaab	Somalia	2006		Ahmed Abdi Godane	Ahmad Umar	Islamism Salafi jihadism Wahhabism Anti-Christian sentiment	Somali Civil War				
