= Eduardo Franco Isaza =

Colombian politician and guerillero

Eduardo Franco Isaza (1920 - July 13, 2009) was a Colombian politician and guerrillero. He was a member of the Colombian Liberal Party guerillas in the Eastern Plains of Colombia during La Violencia.

== Biography ==
He was born in Sogamoso, Boyacá Department and studied at the Colegio de Boyacá in Tunja. After his parents' death he joined the Liberal guerrillas.

He led the Liberal guerillas, alongside others such as Guadalupe Salcedo, during La Violencia, against soldiers of both the National Colombian Army and guerillas of the Colombian Conservative Party. Amongst his most notable military actions was the ambush of El Turpial on July, 1952, which was a major victory for the Liberals during the period. They also wrote the Law of the Plains signed by 42 Liberal officials of the Colombian Eastern Plains, on September 11, 1952. Following the amnesty for Liberal guerillas negotiated by general Alfredo Duarte Blum in September 1953, which Franco considered to be a treason to the Liberal cause, Franco entered self-imposed exile in Venezuela. There, he married Inés Mendoza García, daughter of the Liberal politician Plinio Mendoza Neira, and he worked as a journalist. He wrote his memoirs, titled Las guerrillas del llano: testimonio de una lucha de cuatro años por la libertad, which was censored in Colombia. He died in 2009 in Bogotá of heart disease.

== Books ==
- Las guerrillas del llano: testimonio de una lucha de cuatro años por la libertad, 1955
