= 1949 Colombian presidential election =

- 27 November 1949
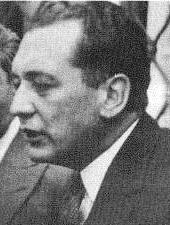
Nominee	Laureano Gómez
Party	Conservative
Popular vote	1,140,122
Percentage	100%
President before election
Mariano Ospina Pérez
Conservative
Elected President
Laureano Gómez
Conservative

Presidential elections were held in Colombia on 27 November 1949. The result was a victory for Laureano Gómez of the Conservative Party, who received all but 23 of the 1.1 million valid votes cast. The opposition Liberal Party withdrew from the election and called for a boycott after their candidate Darío Echandía was the victim of a failed assassination attempt.

It is widely speculated that Jorge Eliécer Gaitán would likely have been elected President had he not been assassinated on 9 April 1948. This assassination occurred immediately prior to the armed insurrection or Bogotazo.

== Results ==
Candidate	Party	Votes	%
Laureano Gómez	Colombian Conservative Party	1,140,122	100.00
Others		23	0.00
Total		1,140,145	100.00
Valid votes		1,140,145	99.96
Invalid/blank votes		501	0.04
Total votes		1,140,646	100.00
Registered voters/turnout		2,866,339	39.79
Source: Nohlen

== Bibliography ==
- Weyl, Nathaniel (1961). Red Star Over Cuba, the Russian Assault on the Western Hemisphere. Arlington House. ISBN 0-8159-6705-5.
