= Efraín Guzmán =

Colombian guerilla leader FARC-EP

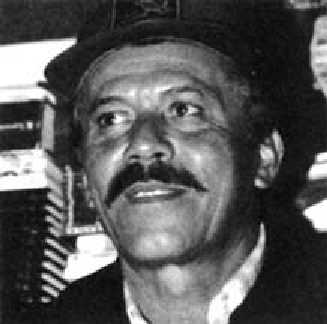
Noel Matta Matta-Guzmán

Noel Matta Matta-Guzmán, also known by his nom de guerre Efraín Guzmán (c. 1937 – 2002), was a Colombian guerrilla leader, founding member of the Revolutionary Armed Forces of Colombia (FARC). He died of natural causes in 2002.

== Early years ==
According to FARC's official gazette Matta Matta-Guzmán was born in the village of La Lindosa, near the town of Chaparral, Tolima Department. During his childhood he grew up working as a peasant in the Quindio Department as Colombian coffee collector.

== La Violencia ==
At the age of 16 he moved to Villarrica, Tolima in 1953 where, during the dictatorship of General Gustavo Rojas Pinilla, joined the Alfonso Castañeda guerrilla group.

After numerous firefights with the Colombian Army his guerrilla group was forced to retreat to El Guayabero jungle, there he met guerrilla leader Dúmar Aljure and became commander, dubbed as "Comandante Nariño". With the deescalation of the turmoil era of La Violencia period Guzman dedicated again to agricultural activities.

== Colombian armed conflict ==
In 1964, the government of President Guillermo León Valencia ordered a military operation for the recovery of the Marquetalia region where the guerrillas had taken over the functions of the state, Guzman restarted his militant activities. In 1966, as "Comandante Nariño" Guzman participated in the second conference of the Southern Bloc which constituted the Revolutionary Armed Forces of Colombia (FARC) in which he also met Manuel Marulanda Velez (Tiro Fijo).

In 1973, after the Conference of Guayabero, Guzman went with Marulanda to southern Tolima Department. The government of Colombia began a military offensive against the guerrillas in the region called Operation Sonora in which the Guzman participated in combats against the Colombian Army but the FARC was greatly crippled. After the Sixth Conference of the FARC "Comandante Nariño" was appointed commander of the 5th Front of the FARC replacing Alberto Martinez killed in combat by the Colombian Army. From this day on he changed his alias to "Efraín Guzmán".

In the Eighth Conference of the FARC Guzman was officially incorporated into the FARC's Secretariat (Higher Command) and was assigned to the Caribbean Bloc of the FARC-EP.

== Personal life ==
According to El Tiempo Guzman had a son named Élmer Caviedes who was also part of the FARC, with the alias of "Albeiro Córdoba".
