= Dumar Aljure =

Colombian guerilla and political leader (1928–1968)

- Born: 1928
- Died: April 5, 1968 (aged 39–40)
- Occupations: Bandit, political figure, guerrilla fighter

Dumar Aljure (1928–April 5, 1968) was a Colombian guerrillero and political figure.

== Early life ==
In 1928, Dumar Aljure was born in Girardot, Cundinamarca, in Colombia. His father was a shopkeeper from Lebanon. He did not receive very much education, and spent some of his youth as a laborer in Bogotá. From an early age he was in conflict with the law, being jailed for theft in 1945 before joining the National Army of Colombia in 1950.

This was the time of La Violencia, a conflict between the Colombian Liberal Party and the Colombian Conservative Party. Aljure's sympathies lay with the Liberal Party, and he soon deserted the army, which was affiliated with the Conservatives, in order to join the guerrilla forces fighting for the Liberals. He first joined a group called the Bautista brothers, but due to disagreements with the group leadership he switched to another group, the Fonseca brothers, before finally joining a group led by Guadalupe Salcedo.

Salcedo gave Aljure command of his group's operations in the San Martín Territory near the Ariari River, a rural region of Meta Department, and Aljure took over operations in this region sometime in early or late 1953. Following a coup by General of the Army Gustavo Rojas Pinilla in June 1953, much of the violence in Colombia ceased, and Rojas tried to use his army to build stability. In 1954 and 1955, Aljure had carried out guerrilla activities outside the Arriari region, but in 1955, pursued by Rojas' Army, he returned to San Martín.

== Political activities ==
Rojas, content for Aljure and some other guerrillas to stay in isolated Arriari region, eventually left Aljure alone. Around this time, Aljure set himself up as the political head of the region, creating a shadow government quite independent from the central government, and began to rule over it. In effect, he became the dictator of his own autonomous republic, and he won the allegiance of the populace by using his guerrilla band, by now a small army, to protect them from abuse by the National Police and army.

In 1957, continuing to build up his position as head of the region, he moved to the town of Rincón de Bolívar and began a cattle business. During this period, he was also involved in smuggling industrial and luxury goods, and also forced the farmers of his region to pay him taxes. His considerable economic and political stature eventually allowed him to gain influence over the regular political process as well, and he began to control the election of various municipal and police functionaries. Through these contacts, Aljure was able to obtain information on the activities of the National Police and army, in order to avoid being apprehended by them. In addition, Aljure was able to influence the disposition of votes in Meta Department, much of which he now controlled, and he used this power to curry favor with the national political elite of the Liberal Party.

== Death ==
After the congressional elections of 1968, Aljure's situation began to change. In that election, a selection of candidates supported by Senator Hernando Durán Dussán was defeated, and Dussán, in response, publicly indicated that he might cause a Conservative governor to be appointed as governor of Meta Department, which jeopardized Aljure's supremacy in the region.

In addition, in early 1968 Aljure murdered a bartender while in the presence of an army sergeant, which indicated his contempt for the authority of the military and may have provoked the army to move against him. The army spent several months in the beginning of 1968 searching for him, and on April 5, 1968, the army and police attacked Aljure's house at Rincón de Bolívar. A lengthy firefight ensued, which left dead Aljure, Aljure's wife, and thirteen guerillas.

His cadaver was made available for public display, and was viewed by more than 1,000 people.
