= Human rights in Colombia =

Colombia is a sovereign state situated in South America. It has been a member of the United Nations since 5 November 1945, and is party to a variety of international agreements concerning human rights. It also has a series of domestic laws concerning the protection of human rights. However, Colombia's human rights record often contradicts directly with the laws and agreements to which it is bound; Colombia was referred to as the country with the "worst human rights record in the western hemisphere," by HRW in 2007. The same was said of Guatemala in 1998, as well as Cuba in 2012 and Venezuela today. In the UK Foreign Office annual human rights report for 2010, Colombia features as one of 20 "Countries of Concern".

== Colombia and The International Bill of Human Rights ==
Two international treaties concerning human rights were established by the United Nations in 1966: the International Covenant on Civil and Political Rights with its two Optional Protocols and the International Covenant on Economic, Social and Cultural Rights. These two treaties, together with the Universal Declaration on Human Rights (UDHR), make up the International Bill of Human Rights. Colombia signed both treaties in 1966, with their ratification being completed in October 1969.

== Colombia and International Humanitarian Law ==
In 1961, Colombia ratified the four Geneva Conventions of 1949 that form the basis of International Humanitarian Law and the two additional protocols of 1977 were ratified in 1993 and 1995 respectively. As of September 2011, Colombia had not signed up to the third additional protocol of 2005.

== The Colombian Constitution ==
As well as detailing the right of Colombian citizens to fundamental rights (e.g. right to life, equality before the law), the constitution mentions the right to economic, social and cultural rights (e.g. labour rights, right to education, rights for groups in need of special protection), as well as collective and environmental rights. It recognizes special rights for indigenous populations, it allows for citizens to take direct legal action against the state with a right to what is known as the tutela, it creates the Constitutional Court, and it determines the existence of posts for human rights ombudsmen. The constitution of 1991 allows, in theory at least, for the human rights of Colombia's citizens to be protected under national constitutional law.

== Respect for Human Rights in Colombia ==
=== Human Rights Defenders in Colombia ===
As reported by the National and International Campaign for the Right to Defend Human Rights, and as documented regularly in reports by leading human rights organisations, . In 2010, according to the Colombian-based human rights organisation Somos Defensores, at least 174 acts of aggression towards human rights defenders were committed. This included 32 murders and 109 death threats. As Human Rights First reports, attacks against human rights defenders include also 'smear campaigns and break-ins, threatening and omnipresent surveillance, physical assaults, kidnapping, violence directed toward family members, and assassination attempts'.

The Colombian government has a special protection program that seeks to protect those under threat. The Colombian embassy in Washington states that the protection program 'offers long-term services based on specific needs of vulnerable individuals and groups'. In spite of this, the figures for the first semester of 2011 showed an increase of 126% in acts of aggressions committed against human rights defenders from 2010. Paramilitary groups were held responsible in 59% of the cases, state security forces were held responsible for 10% and the guerrilla groups 2%. Colombian officials have also been widely implicated in stigmatising the work of human rights defenders, often making unfounded accusations linking them to guerrilla groups.

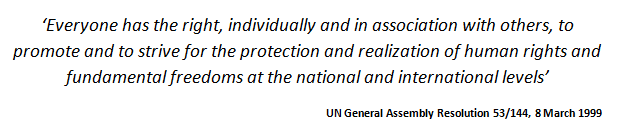
UN Resolution

Justice for Colombia reports that between August 2010 and June 2011, there were 104 murders with direct ramifications for human rights concerns in Colombia. Those murdered included human rights defenders, trade unionists and community leaders. On average, according to these figures, one murder took place every three days. Human rights defenders find little protection in the Colombian justice system; 784 human rights defenders were threatened, attacked or murdered between 2002 and 2009, there has been a conviction in only 10 of these cases.

=== Labour Rights in Colombia ===
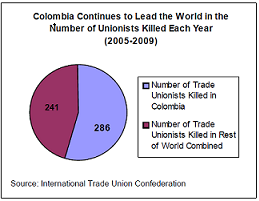

Colombia is widely referred to as the most dangerous country in the world to be a trade unionist. The 2011 Annual Survey of Violation of Trade Union Rights published by the International Trade Union Confederation (ITUC) reports that 49 trade unionists were killed in Colombia in 2010, more than in the rest of the world put together. According to government figures, 37 unionists were murdered. Between January and August 2011, 19 trade unionists have been reported killed.

The ITUC reports that between 2000 and 2010 Colombia has accounted for 63.12% of trade unionists murdered globally. According to Human Rights Watch and Justice for Colombia, most of these murders are attributed to right-wing paramilitaries, whilst some are directly attributed to state forces. Amnesty International reported in 2007 that for cases in which the perpetrator was known, paramilitaries were responsible for 49% of the attacks against trade-unionists, state forces were responsible for 43%, and the guerrilla forces were responsible for 2%.

According to the National Labour School (ENS), a Colombian NGO monitoring trade union violence, impunity for crimes committed against trade unionists is running at 94%.

Trade union membership in Colombia has fallen dramatically since the 1980s. According to Justice for Colombia, a British NGO campaigning for human rights and an end to trade union violence in Colombia, this is due to a combination of factors: 'Less than 5% of Colombian workers are members of trade unions – the lowest level in the Americas. Less than twenty years ago it was double that figure but violence against trade unionists, changes in the labour market and anti-trade union policies have led to a huge decrease in membership. Today only 850,000 Colombians are members of a trade union'. As demonstrated by figures from the ENS, such is the nature of the Colombian workforce, it is very difficult for the majority of Colombian workers to join a trade union: 'of Colombia's 18 million working people...11 million are working in the informal economy....Of the remaining 7 million people (who do have formal employment) only 4 million benefit from permanent employment contracts'.

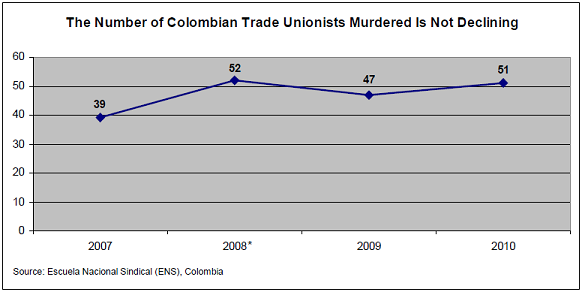

Colombia has ratified 60 ILO conventions and the eight conventions on fundamental labour rights. However, Justice for Colombia reports that in 2011 Colombians are still working in 'conditions so poor that they violate both ILO conventions and Colombian national law'. Up until 2010, Colombia had featured every year for 21 years on the ILO blacklist of countries to be investigated for non-compliance with conventions concerning labour rights.

Colombia's removal from the ILO blacklist list in 2010 was cited by Colombian officials as a demonstration that respect for trade unions and for labour rights had improved in Colombia. However, the UK's Trade Union Congress (TUC) points out that in 2010 the ILO also made an agreement with the Colombian government to send a high level commission to visit the country in response to the continued violation of labour rights. Two of Colombia's three major trade union centres, the CUT and the CTC, released a statement in 2010 in response to the decisions made by the ILO: 'the acceptance of a High Level Tripartite Mission on the part of the Colombian government implies that the State accepts it has not complied with ILO requirements in a satisfactory way.... at no point has ILO indicated that the issues of human rights and freedom of association have been solved'.

=== Legal Rights in Colombia ===
Whilst the right to due process in all legal processes is a right decreed to Colombians in article 29 of the Colombian constitution, human rights observers regularly report failures to provide this and indeed other legal rights. The 2011 report from the UN High Commissioner for Human Rights for Colombia reports that 'the prosecution and arbitrary detentions of human rights defenders on the basis of uncorroborated information provided mainly by informants, demobilized persons and military intelligence reports, continue to be of concern'. According to the respected Jesuit human rights defender, Padre Javier Giraldo, between August 2002 and August 2004 there were 6332 arbitrary detentions.

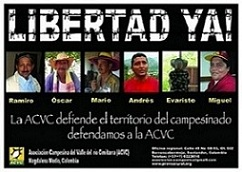
"Freedom Now!" Poster calling for the release of six illegally detained community leaders in Colombia.

Shortcomings in legal processes have been reported in cases concerning trade unionists, community activists, academics, and other groups and individuals who, whilst seeking the advancement of rights in their relevant spheres, may oppose certain elements of state policy. According to both Colombian and international organisations, the response from the state has often been in the form of illegal criminal proceedings. Such characteristics led Human Rights First, in a report looking into the prosecution process in cases brought against human rights defenders, to conclude that 'corruption and failure to abide by national and international due process standards are endemic to the criminal justice system in Colombia'.

One example of organisations being persecuted illegally through the courts is that of ACVC, a grass-roots peasant farmer organisation focused on human rights issues in rural Colombia. Between 2007 and 2008 all six members of its executive committee were arrested on charges of rebellion. In April and May 2008 charges were dropped against all but two with the reviewing prosecutor stating that the witnesses' testimony was "based on no more than personal opinion and should have been verified forcefully by the investigative agencies". The remaining two, in spite of being detained on the back of the same testimony, were forced to remain in jail. Miguel Gonzalez was released without charge in June 2009, one year and six months after he was originally arrested. Andres Gil was the last to be released; he was detained for almost two years with no conviction ever being made.

=== Political Rights in Colombia ===
According to a Colombian group focused on solidarity with political prisoners, Traspasa los Muros, there are 7,200 people being kept in jails across Colombia as a result of their political activities or beliefs. Justice for Colombia talks of 'over 5,000' political prisoners. The British MP Jim McGovern released a statement in 2010 in support of a campaign run by Justice for Colombia calling for the release of Colombia's political prisoners: 'These people are innocent men and women who have been imprisoned simply because they disagree with the Government or criticise Government policies. The Colombian authorities have to understand that jailing people in order to silence their opinions is completely unacceptable'.

According to the Colombian victims' organisation MOVICE, these detentions are used to obstruct the activities carried out by those working to denounce human rights abuses whilst at the same time acting to delegitimise and criminalise their work.

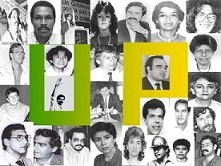
Between 3,000 and 5,000 were killed in the genocide of the Patriotic Union political party between 1984 and 1994.

Colombia has a past and present history of politically motivated violence. Hernando Hernandez, an elected representative for Colombia's indigenous, denounced that five members of his Democratic Pole party had been killed in the lead up to the 2011 elections. In August 2011, the senator and victims' rights leader Ivan Cepeda revealed that he was informed of a murder plot being planned against him by two state security prison guards.

Between 1984 and 1994 Colombia suffered the genocide of a political party called the Patriotic Union (UP). The UP was born as a result of negotiations held in 1984 between the FARC, Colombia's oldest and largest guerrilla group, and the Colombian government that were to allow FARC members and supporters to follow an electoral path in order to advance their political objectives. By 1994, between 3,000 and 5,000 members were assassinated in a systematic campaign to wipe-out the party and its members. A Colombian human rights organisation dedicated to the search for justice for the victims of the UP calls the genocide 'an alarming and representative case of a persecution of an opposition movement'. In August 2011, the Colombian state, recognising its responsibility, apologised for the 1994 assassination of the last UP senator, Manuel Cepeda Vargas.

In 2006, a scandal was uncovered in Colombia which showed a program of espionage against perceived political opponents of the government had been in operation. The wiretapping of phones and emails of human rights defenders, judges, politicians and international human rights organisations was carried out by the state intelligence agency, the Department for Administrative Security (DAS). The 2011 report from the Office of the UN High Commissioner for Human Rights commented on the continuing developments in the scandal: 'Investigations continued on former directors for illegal surveillance between 2005 and 2008. Statements by DAS senior personnel implicated former senior officials of the President's office as beneficiaries of the illegally obtained information'.

=== Economic Rights in Colombia ===
In its 2010 report, the UN Committee on Economic, Cultural and Social Rights expressed its concern at "the wide inequalities in the distribution of income in the State party in the context of poverty." It is particularly concerned that the taxation system is regressive and more favourable to persons from the highest income groups. The Constitutional Court was commended by the report for establishing 'criteria for determining the legal minimum wage, the right to fair remuneration and maintenance of purchasing power', but the unequal land distribution and lack of agrarian reform was a further concern mentioned by the committee. According to the UK pressure group ABColombia, 0.4% of landholders own 61% of the rural land in Colombia.

In 2015, the National Administrative Department of Statistics (DANE) reported that 27.8% of the population were living below the poverty line, of which 7.9% in "extreme poverty". In rural zones, extreme poverty is as high as 18.0%.

== Vulnerable populations ==
=== LGBT rights ===
Lesbian, gay, bisexual, and transgender (LGBT) rights in Colombia have progressed since consensual homosexual activity was decriminalized in 1980 with amendments to the Criminal Code, making it one of Latin America's most advanced countries in regard to LGBT rights legislation. Between February 2007 and April 2008, three rulings of the Constitutional Court granted registered same-sex couples the same pension, social security and property rights as for registered heterosexual couples. In 2011, Congress passed a law banning discrimination based on sexual orientation. On 28 April 2016, the Constitutional Court legalized same-sex marriage.

=== Intersex rights ===
In 1999, the Constitutional Court of Colombia became the first court to consider the human rights implications of medical interventions to alter the sex characteristics of intersex children. The Court restricted the age at which intersex children could be the subjects of surgical interventions. Morgan Holmes states that, while children who reach the same age and circumstances will be in the same position, then they will "be permitted access to the conditions that protect their autonomies". Other intersex children will not benefit, in particular at the point they are born: "In its worst potential implications and uses, the court's decision may simply amplify the need to expedite procedures".

== See also ==
- Colombian armed conflict (1964–present)
- Guerrilla movements in Colombia
- Plan Colombia
- Paramilitarism in Colombia
- FARC
- National Liberation Army (Colombia)
