= John Humphrey Freedom Award =

The John Humphrey Freedom Award was presented annually by the Canadian human rights group Rights & Democracy, to an organization or individual from any country or region of the world for exceptional achievement in the promotion of human rights and democratic development. It was established in 1992.

The award consisted of a grant of C$25,000, as well as a speaking tour of Canadian cities to help increase awareness of the recipient’s human rights work.

It was named in honor of John Peters Humphrey, a Canadian human rights law professor who prepared the first draft of the Universal Declaration of Human Rights.

== Award winners ==
- 2011 - Ales Michalevic, Belarus
- 2010 - PROVEA (Programa Venezolano de Educacion-Accion en Derechos Humanos), Venezuela
- 2009 - La'Onf, the Iraqi Nonviolence Network, Iraq
- 2008 - Zimbabwe Lawyers for Human Rights, Zimbabwe
- 2007 - Akbar Ganji, Iran
- 2006 - Su Su Nway, Burma
- 2005 - Yan Christian Warinussy, West Papua, Indonesia
- 2004 - Godeliève Mukasarasi, Rwanda
- 2003 - Kimy Pernía Domicó, Colombia and Angélica Mendoza de Ascarza, Peru
- 2002 - Ayesha Imam, Nigeria
- 2001 - Dr. Sima Samar, Afghanistan
- 2000 - Reverend Timothy Njoya, Kenya
- 1999 – Cynthia Maung and Min Ko Naing, Burma
- 1998 – Palden Gyatso, Tibet
- 1997 – Father Javier Giraldo, Colombia
- 1996 – Sultana Kamal, Bangladesh
- 1995 – Bishop Carlos Filipe Ximenes Belo, East Timor
- 1994 – Campaign for Democracy, Nigeria and Egyptian Organization for Human Rights, Egypt
- 1993 – La Plate-forme des organismes haïtiens de défense des droits humains, Haïti
- 1992 – Instituto de Defensa Legal, Peru
