= Sultana Kamal (activist) =

Bangladeshi activist

- সুলতানা কামাল
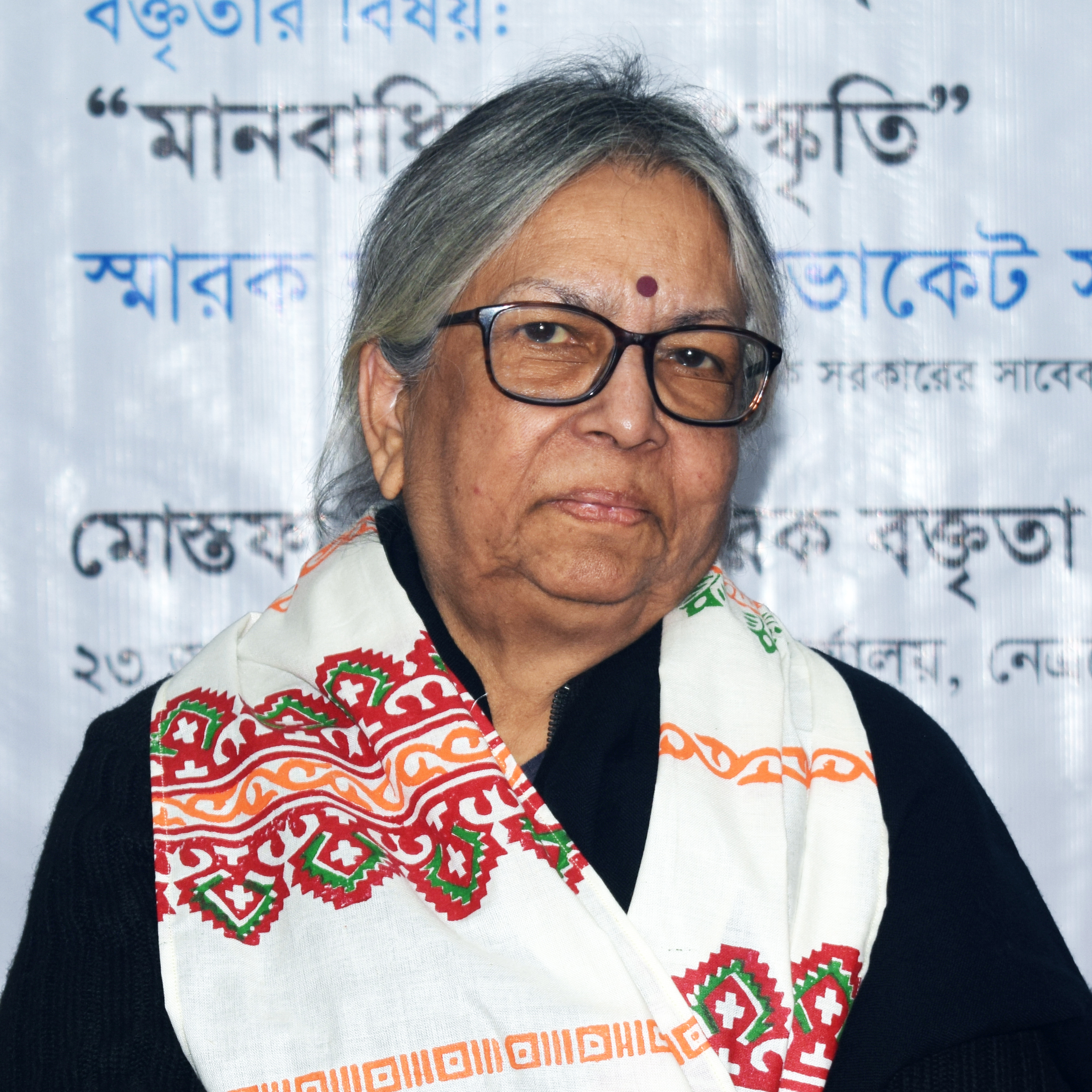
- Born: 1950 (age 75–76)
- Education: MA
- Alma mater: University of Dhaka
- Occupations: Lawyer, Human rights defender
- Spouse: Supriyo Chakravarty
- Children: Dia Chakravarty
- Parents: Kamal Uddin Ahmed (father); Sufia Kamal (mother)
- Awards: John Humphrey Freedom Award, Anannya Top Ten Awards (1995)

Sultana Kamal is a Bangladeshi lawyer and human rights activist. She serves as the executive director of Ain o Salish Kendra, a civil rights organisation. In 2006, she served as adviser in the Caretaker government of Bangladesh led by President Iajuddin Ahmed during the 2006-2008 Bangladeshi political crisis. Kamal, along with three other advisers, resigned from the caretaker government. Her mother Sufia Kamal was a participant of the Bangladesh Liberation War.

== Early life and education ==
Sultana was born to Kamal Uddin Ahmed and Sufia Kamal in 1950. Sufia was a writer and poet. She was enrolled in Leela Nagh's Nari Shikhkha Mondir. She passed SSC from Azimpur Girls' High School and HSC from Holy Cross College. She received her Master's from University of Dhaka. In 1978 she completed her Bachelor of Laws. She passed BCS Examination. In 1981 she achieved Masters of Development Studies in Women and Development in Netherlands.

== Career ==
Sultana started her career as a teacher in the Music College. She joined Bangladesh Tobacco Company. In 1976 she entered an international voluntary service in Khadimnagar, Sylhet. Up to 1990 she worked for Vietnamese boat peoples in Hong Kong as a UN legal consultant. In 1996, she won the John Humphrey Freedom Award from the Canadian human rights group Rights & Democracy.

In 1971, she also joined the Mukti Bahini and was one of the founders of the Bangladesh Field Hospital in Agartala for the freedom fighters. Sultana and her sister Saeeda were the two out of four women to get the CNC's Special Commendation for their role in the liberation war.

She writes in the dailies and periodicals on social, legal and gender issues. She has published a book on women's legal rights titled Manobir Nishanka Mon translated into English under the title of Her Unfearing Mind. Her latest publications include Manabidhakar, Rashtra O Samaj (Human Rights, State and the Society) and Chilam Kothay Jeno Nilimar Niche, a compilation of articles written by her over the last twenty five years. She travelled to more than 30 countries in professional capacity to address issues related to human and women's rights.

At present she is the executive director of Ain-o-Salish Kendra (ASK). In addition to that she is now the chairperson of the We Can End Violence Against Women Alliance and chairperson for Transparency International Bangladesh. She is also co-chairperson for the Chittagong Hill Tracts Commission. She is a trustee of Freedom Foundation and Protichi Bangladesh founded by Amartya Sen, The Gandhi Ashram Trust, Rokeya Memorial Foundation, a national council member of Bangladesh Mahila Parishad, member of Bangladesh UNESCO National Commission, The National Legal Aid Committee, The Blue Planet Initiative, member of Asia Pacific Forum for Women Law and Development (Regional Network), Women Living Under Muslim Laws (International Network), South Asians For Human Right and South Asian Partnership among many others.

She had been appointed an Advisor to the Caretaker Government in October 2006 from which she resigned with 3 other colleagues in December which helped Lt. Gen. Moeen to take over power. Sheikh Hasina claimed that they failed to discharge their responsibilities including to hold parliamentary elections.

Sultana was active in a children's organisation Kachi Kanchar Mela, Cultural group Sangskriti Sangsad, Struggles for Cultural Autonomy and the '69 mass upheavals as well as other social movements. Sultana was a founder member of the famous drama group "Nagorik Natya Samproday" and has acted in leading roles in its earlier productions.

== Awards ==
- Anannya Top Ten Awards (1995)

== Personal life ==
Sultana was married to Supriyo Chakravarty (1944–2019), a Sylhet-based income tax lawyer. Their daughter Dia Chakravarty is a political activist based in London.
