= Zimbabwe Lawyers for Human Rights =

Zimbabwe Lawyers for Human Rights (ZLHR) is a not for profit human rights organization whose core objective is to foster a culture of human rights in Zimbabwe as well as encourage the growth and strengthening of human rights at all levels of Zimbabwean society through observance of the rule of law.

== Objectives ==
ZLHR has stated a commitment to upholding respect for the rule of law and the unimpeded administration of justice, free and fair elections, the free flow of information and the protection of constitutional rights and freedoms in Zimbabwe and the surrounding region.

== International recognition ==
U.S. Secretary of State Condoleezza Rice announced in Washington, D.C., on December 10, 2007, the first Award for the first annual Freedom Defender's Award is the NGO Zimbabwe Lawyers for Human Rights, chosen out of an impressive group of nominees from across the globe. The Freedom Defenders Award, announced in 2006 in commemoration of International Human Rights Day, goes to a foreign individual or nongovernmental organization that has shown exceptional courage and leadership in the defense of human rights.

In 2008, the group also won the John Humphrey Freedom Award of the Canadian-based International Centre for Human Rights and Democratic Development. The award citation praised the group's "courageous pursuit of justice for victims of human rights abuses inside Zimbabwe" and "leading role in the promotion and protection of human rights", noting that "up to 1,500 Zimbabweans now benefit from the service each year, and its lawyers have yet to lose a single case in the project's five year history."
