= Marquetalia Republic =

Colombian guerrilla enclave overrun in 1964

Coordinates: 3°02′24″N 75°52′12″W

Marquetalia and other "Republics"

"Marquetalia Republic" was an unofficial term used to refer to one of the enclaves in rural Colombia which communist peasant guerrillas held during the aftermath of "La Violencia" (approximately 1948 to 1958). Congressmen of the Colombian Conservative Party described these enclaves, including Marquetalia, as "independent republics" which needed to be brought under state control through military force. This area was eventually overrun by the National Army of Colombia (during "Operation Marquetalia") in May 1964.

Eventually some of the communist survivors reunited elsewhere and later became part of the "Bloque Sur" (Southern Bloc) guerrilla group in 1964, a precursor to the official foundation of the Revolutionary Armed Forces of Colombia (FARC) in 1966.

== Historical background ==
=== La Violencia ===
The assassination of Jorge Eliécer Gaitán in 1948 triggered large riots in Bogotá and smaller scale uprisings throughout the country. This would mark the beginning of La Violencia, a period of intense bipartisan conflict that would cost an estimated 200,000 to 300,000 Colombian lives over the next decade.

Several members of the Colombian Liberal Party and of the Colombian Communist Party had previously organized self-defense groups and guerrilla units during La Violencia that did not demobilize during the amnesty declared by General Gustavo Rojas Pinilla after he took power in 1953.

When Rojas was removed from power in 1958, civilian rule was restored after moderate Conservatives and Liberals, with the support of dissident sectors of the military, agreed to unite under a bipartisan coalition known as the National Front (with included a system of presidential alternation and powersharing both in cabinets and public offices).

From the point of view of members the FARC and the Colombian Communist Party, the Liberal and Conservative elites, though they had instigated the violence, soon grew to fear the consequences of it, and thus formed a loose alliance to preserve their shared desire for political hegemony from possible revolutionary challenges.

Meanwhile, a small number of armed groups formed by Liberals and communists had successfully established a certain degree of self-government in remote regions of the country, one of which eventually became known as the "republic" of Marquetalia by outside observers. For the most part their activities were limited to self-defense after the end of La Violencia, though some extortions of local landowners and short skirmishes with official forces occurred from time to time.

The government initially ignored the growing influence of Communists in such enclaves until 1964 when, under pressure by members of the Colombian Conservative Party in Congress who considered such autonomous "republics" as a de facto threat, the Colombian Army was ordered to attack the communist controlled "republic". In addition to the military offensive, the creation of civic action programs in the area of operations were also considered as necessary by some politicians and also members of the Colombian Army, but initial efforts to implement such programs were not followed upon in the long run.

Following the attack, the guerrillas dispersed to other nearby enclaves, only to later reorganize as the "Southern Bloc" ("Bloque Sur") in 1964, officially renamed "Fuerzas Armadas Revolucionarias de Colombia" (FARC) in 1966, which became the official military arm of the Communist Party.

One of the communist leaders of the enclave, known as Jacobo Arenas, later wrote a book called "Diario de la resistencia de Marquetalia" ("Marquetalia Diary"). The book includes a chronicle of the events of the fight between the guerrilla fighters and the soldiers of the Colombian army.

== Plan Lazo ==
In October 1959, the United States sent a "Special Survey Team" composed of counterinsurgency experts to investigate Colombia's internal security situation. Among other policy recommendations the US team advised that "in order to shield the interests of both Colombian and US authorities against 'interventionist' charges any special aid given for internal security was to be sterile and covert in nature." In February 1962, three years after the 1959 "US Special Survey Team", a Fort Bragg top-level U.S. Special Warfare team headed by Special Warfare Center commander General William P. Yarborough, visited Colombia for a second survey.

The new anti-terrorist policy was instituted as Plan Lazo in 1962 and called for both military operations and civic action programs in violent areas. Following Yarborough's recommendations, the Colombian military worked to combat communist terrorism and bandits guided by Liberal and Conservative parties.

At the behest of the United States, the Colombian government began attacking many of the Communist organizations so-called "self-defense communities" in the early 1960s, attempting to re-assimilate the territories under the control of the national government. FARC was formed in 1964 by Manuel Marulanda Vélez and other PCC members, after a military attack on the community of Marquetalia. 16,000 Colombian troops, backed by the U.S., attacked the village of 1,000 inhabitants, only 48 of whom were armed. Marulanda and 47 others fought against government forces at Marquetalia, and then escaped into the mountains along with the other fighters. These 48 men formed the core of FARC, which quickly grew in size to hundreds of fighters.

== The "Marquetalia Diary" ==
Jacobo Arenas, surviving the invasion of Marquetalia, wrote a book called "Diario de la resistencia de Marquetalia" ("Marquetalia Diary") in 1972. The book includes a chronicle of the events of the fight between the guerrilla fighters and the soldiers of the Colombian army brigade.

In the diary, Arenas describes the geographical location and the natural beauty of the Marquetalia area with many details, giving the reader a detailed mental picture of the area, made up of 800 square km in the Andes, at around 6000 feet above sea level, with the presence of monsoon rainfall. One of the snowed mountains in the department of Huila is more than 12,000 feet high.

The diary puts the guerrilla and peasant struggle in Marquetalia in context, happening six years after the triumph of the 1959 Cuban Revolution, which filled the minds of many worldwide with revolutionary fervor. While the events in Cuba absorbed most of the world's and the region's attention, information about the events in Marquetalia and their aftermath later began to be of great interest throughout Latin America.

The diary highlights some of the inner workings of Marquetalia as a sort of improvised commune or small socialist society, where not only the peasant fighters and Communist Party ideologues were present, but also several members of their families and some of their friends, who worked together as a community for both common socioeconomic and military/defense purposes.

Arenas describes the military operations against Marquetalia in May 1964 as part of a United States initiative called Plan LASO (Latin American Security Operation), allegedly meant to suppress dissent and possible communist rebellions that might spring up in the region. In Colombia, Arenas claims that the offensive against Marquetalia was designed with assistance from the Pentagon and alleges that some 16,000 Colombian Army troops, with the support of military helicopters and airplanes, took part in the operation (the terms used in the book are: 16,000 "Bloodhounds" commanded by the Pentagon "Hawks"). The number of peasant communist fighters was thought to be much smaller, but a previous CIA intelligence report argued that it could reach as many as 2,000, though other estimates and claims have since differed, with most saying 1,600 Colombian troops were involved.

Arenas tells how the fighters scattered, soon regrouped to give birth to the FARC, the former fighters of Marquetalia hide in jungles and remote villages throughout Colombia, reorganizing to fight a war by using irregular techniques in order to some day seize power.

== Aftermath: the Birth of FARC ==
After the implementation of Plan LASO's military phase in May 1964, the survivors of the Marquetalia "commune" held a meeting on May 27, with key leaders such Manuel Marulanda and Jacobo Arenas. The agenda of this meeting was to create a more formal insurgent organization with the main goal of seizing power from capitalists and directing Colombian society according to Marxist doctrine. At the end of the meeting, clearly defined ideas were in place, which continued to be used for the later birth of the Revolutionary Armed Forces of Colombia or FARC in 1966. According to the leftist insurgents, their plan was to spread all over Colombia into areas such as remote villages and jungles for security reasons, while others traveled throughout Latin America to gain experience as part of their armed struggle.

The FARC's Seventh Guerrilla Conference was held in 1982 under the guidance of Jacobo Arenas and Manuel Marulanda. The Conference added the term "People's Army" to the group, resulting in the new name being FARC-EP. The Seventh Guerrilla Conference was a turning point in the FARC's struggle, as it provided them the opportunity to fine-tune their policies and plans in order for them to build their desired socialist state in the future. The FARC's Conferences, as seen by Marxists and Leninists, can be interpreted as similar to the International conferences previously held in Europe with the participation Karl Marx, Fredrick Engels, Vladimir Lenin.

== See also ==
- Alliance for Progress
- History of the FARC-EP
- Plan Colombia
- Operation Phoenix
