= Dia Chakravarty =

Bangladeshi-born British activist (born 1984)

- দিয়া সুদেষ্ণা চক্রবর্তী
- Born: Dia Sudeshna Chakravarty; 1984 (age 41–42); Sylhet District, Bangladesh
- Citizenship: British
- Education: University of Oxford
- Occupations: Political activist, singer, tax consultant, barrister, journalist
- Years active: 2012–present
- Title: Political director of the TaxPayers' Alliance
- Spouse: Duncan Hall (m. 2007)
- Parent(s): Supriyo Chakravarty (father); Sultana Kamal (mother)
- Relatives: Kamal Uddin Ahmed (maternal grandfather); Sufia Kamal (maternal grandmother)
- Musical career
- Origin: London, England
- Genres: Bengali music; World music; bhajan
- Instrument: Vocals
- Years active: 2011–present
- Label: Laser Vision

Dia Sudeshna Chakravarty (Bengali: দিয়া সুদেষ্ণা চক্রবর্তী; born 1984) is a Bangladeshi-born British political activist, former political director of the TaxPayers' Alliance, singer, and Brexit Editor of The Daily Telegraph.

== Early life ==
Chakravarty was born in Bangladesh to parents of two different faiths. Her Muslim mother, Sultana Kamal, is a lawyer and human rights activist who runs a legal aid organisation in Bangladesh. Her Hindu Brahmin father, Supriyo Chakravarty, is also a lawyer. Her parents both decided to keep their respective religions after marriage. She is her parents' only child. Her maternal grandmother is poet Sufia Kamal.

Because of Chakravarty's parents' and grandparents' activism and anti-fundamentalist stance, her family have been under threat on and off her whole life. She has grown up with threatening telephone calls and her home has been firebombed twice.

Chakravarty attended a school in Sylhet her parents set up which taught the British Council-regulated O-level curriculum and examination syllabus. The school took students up to the age of 14, after which her schooling was mostly tutorial-based. Later, she entered the mainstream education system to continue with her O-levels. She achieved seven O-levels.

She then got a partial scholarship to sixth-form college in Oxford, to board and sit her A-levels, after her parents remortgaged their family home, she left for the UK in 2001. Her lawyer mother, who had spent most of her life doing voluntary work until then, moved to Dhaka, to take up a full-time job. Chakravarty studied Law at St. Edmund Hall in the University of Oxford and became a Barrister in 2008.

== Political activism ==
Chakravarty started her career as a tax consultant in London before moving into communication and public affairs. From July 2012 to December 2013, she was a deputy director at The Freedom Association where she advocated for freedom of the press, free speech, and freedom of expression. In January 2014, she was appointed political director of the TaxPayers' Alliance.

Chakravarty moved into communications and public affairs. She worked for Banking on Change, a global partnership between Barclays Bank and two international charities seeking to extend access to basic financial services through savings-led microfinance.

In August 2014, Chakravarty appeared on BBC Two's Newsnight, discussing consultancy culture in the public sector. In November 2014 and March 2015, and October 2016, she appeared on BBC One's Question Time. In January 2015, she contributed on BBC Radio 4's Any Questions?

In July 2017, Chakravarty, a prominent Leave campaigner during the UK EU membership Referendum campaign, was appointed Brexit Editor of The Daily Telegraph.

In September 2017, Chakravarty appeared on Question Time. In October, Chakravarty appeared on Newsnight, discussing Brexit. In the same month, she was listed at Number 100 by commentator Iain Dale in his '100 Most Influential on the Right'.

== Singing career ==
Chakravarty took her first music lesson from Prateek Enda in Sylhet and had an early start in her musical training in Rabindranath Tagore songs. Although she specialises in Bengali music, since moving to the UK she has added Hindi songs to her repertoire. She now takes lessons from London-based singer-master Anuradha Roma Choudhury.

Chakravarty performs in London and abroad. In August 2014, her debut album A Bloom in Vain and Other Songs was released.

== Personal life ==
In October 2007, Chakravarty married Duncan Hall. She met her husband while at school and decided to settle in England after completing her university and Bar examinations. Chakravarty is also involved with Udayan, a Bengali cultural group.

== Discography ==
=== A Bloom in Vain and Other Songs ===
A Bloom in Vain and Other Songs
- Cover design by Rajib Chakraborty and photography by Ranjay RC

Studio album by Dia Chakravarty
- Released: 22 August 2014 (Bangladesh)
- Recorded: 2014 at Studio Vibrations in Kolkata, India
- Genres: Bengali; World music; bhajan; folk
- Length: 39:17
- Language: Bengali
- Label: Laser Vision
- Producer: Prattyush Banerjee

A Bloom in Vain and Other Songs (Bengali: কত চামেলি বৃথা যায়) is the debut studio album by Dia Chakravarty, released on 22 August 2014. Chakravarty, having studied law at the University of Oxford, chose songs of composers, who, except for Dwijendralal, studied law, including Tagore who eventually dropped out; and except for Rajanikanta, every one of them went to England for higher studies.

In August 2014, Chakravarty told New Age, "Music is my passion and runs through my blood. I love to sing Bangla songs of almost every genre."

The album consists of four pairs of tracks by a quartet of composers – Rabindranath Tagore, Atulprasad Sen, Dwijendralal Ray, and Rajanikanta Sen from the late 1800s to early 1900s. It was arranged by Prattyush Banerjee and recorded by Goutam Basu in Usha Uthup's music studio "Studio Vibrations" in Kolkata.

The album was released by Laser Vision on 22 August 2014. at Sufia Kamal Auditorium at Bangladesh National Museum.

Mosabber Rahman of the Dhaka Tribune said of Chakravarty, "Her voice lacks pretension, and she has the sincerity of a schoolgirl preparing for the final exam".

==== Track listing ====
No.	Title	Lyrics	Length
1.	"Bodhua Nid Nahi Ankhipate" (Monsoon Night, Alone)	Atulprasad Sen	5:23
2.	"Ami Sakal Kajer" (Reflections of a Sinner)	Rajanikanta Sen	4:47
3.	"Tomar Kotha Hetha" (Wavering Heart of the Rootless)	Rabindranath Tagore	5:20
4.	"Tumi Kobe Ashibe" (A Bloom in Vain)	Atulprasad Sen	5:09
5.	"Se Keno Dekha Dilo Re" (The Agony of a Glimpse)	Dwijendralal Ray	5:00
6.	"Sakhi, Bhabona Kahare Bole" (What, Then, Is Love?)	Tagore	3:52
7.	"Koto Bhabe Birajichho" (The World Exists to Prove You Are There)	Rajanikanta Sen	3:51
8.	"Ami Sara Sakalti" (This Garland, In the Morning Sun)	Ray	5:55
Total length:			39:17

== See also ==
- British Bangladeshis
- List of British Bangladeshis
- Music of Bengal
