= Javier Giraldo =

Colombian priest (1944–2026)

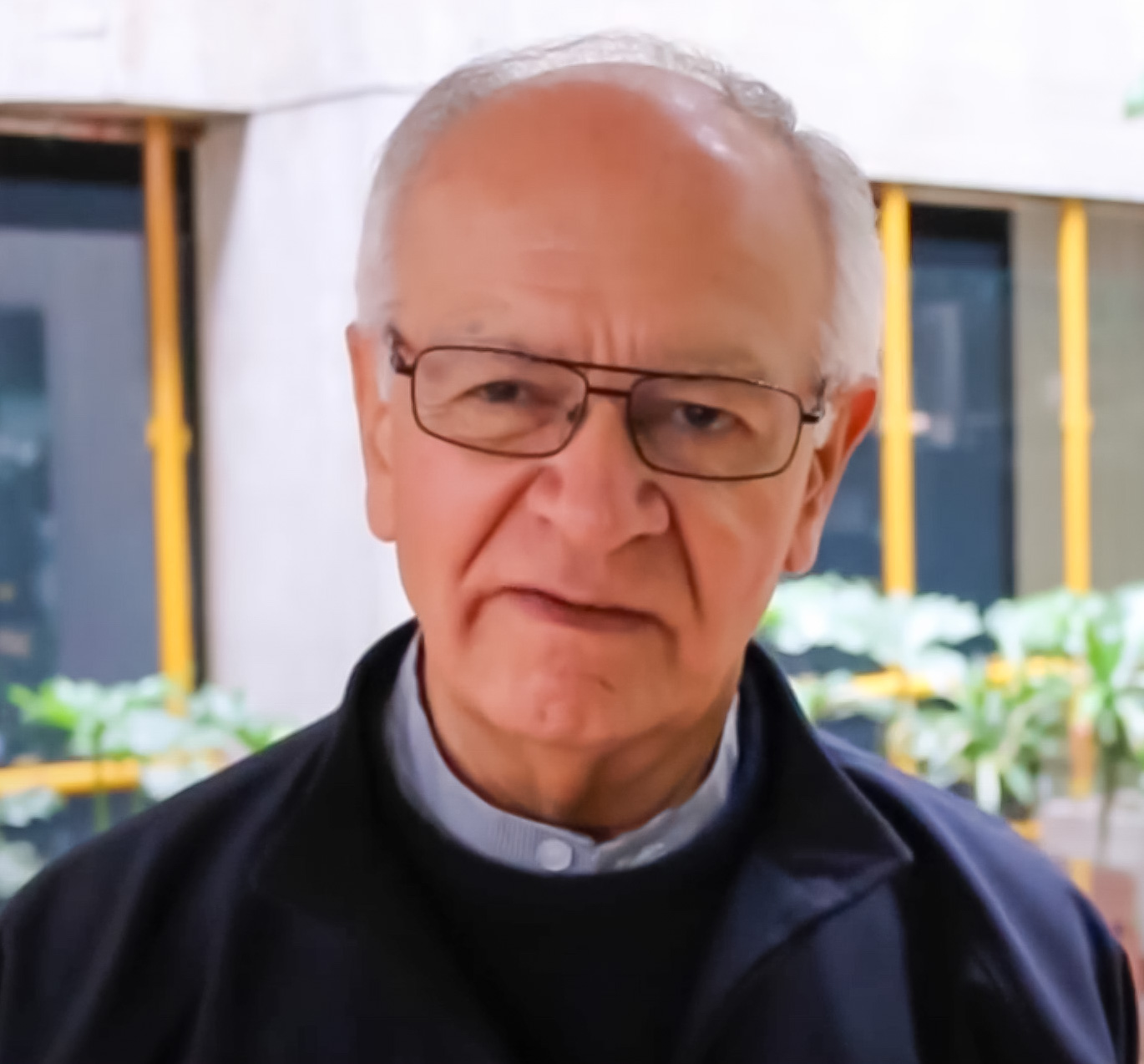
- Giraldo in 2015
- Born: 1944; Colombia
- Died: 25 August 2026 (aged 82); Bogotá, Colombia

Javier Giraldo Moreno (1944 – 25 August 2026), known in his community as Father Javier, was a Colombian Jesuit priest and human rights activist. He helped found and subsequently worked as an investigator for the CINEP / Peace Program magazine Noche y Niebla, documenting human rights abuses. Cases he documented included the 1988–1991 massacres in Trujillo and killings of members of the San José de Apartadó Peace Community, including a 2005 massacre. Due to his work, he received threats to his life and was forced to leave Colombia on multiple occasions.

Giraldo wrote multiple books on the Colombian conflict and maintained a database of killings and disappearances. In 1997, he was awarded the Canadian John Humphrey Freedom Award for his work in human rights.

== Early life and education ==
Javier Giraldo Moreno was born in Colombia in 1944. His mother was an artist and his father was a hydro project administrator, and he had three brothers and a sister. He decided to join the clergy when he was fifteen.

He attended the Pontificia Universidad Javeriana, where he earned a degree in philosophy and a master's degree in theology; he also studied social sciences at the University of Paris.

== Career and activism ==
Giraldo worked for over five decades documenting human rights abuses in Colombia. After being ordained with the Society of Jesus in the 1970s, he began his work as a priest in a working-class neighborhood in Bogotá. He became more involved in human rights activism during the presidency of Julio César Turbay Ayala (1978–1982) and the resulting Estatuto de Seguridad policies and became affiliated with the CINEP / Peace Program. He worked as an investigator for their magazine Noche y Niebla, which he had helped found.

Giraldo helped found the Inter-Church Commission for Justice and Peace (Comisión Intereclesial de Justicia y Paz) in 1988; he served as their executive director. Comprising 55 Catholic organizations in Colombia, the organization was founded in the aftermath of the Virgilio Barco Vargas administration campaign against guerrilla groups, which resulted in many civilian deaths. For the organization, Giraldo compiled a data bank recording killings, massacres, and disappearances in the Colombian conflict; as of 2010, it was "the only comprehensive record" of such data.

The next year, in 1989, Giraldo was forced to leave Colombia due to threats to his safety. He also began working as the Latin American secretary on the Permanent Peoples' Tribunal, a role he worked in until 1991. In 1997, he was given the Canadian John Humphrey Freedom Award for his work in human rights; he announced he was giving the $30,000 award to the U'wa people, many of whom were threatening a mass suicide in response to Occidental Petroleum plans to drill for oil on their lands.

Over the course of his career, Giraldo faced numerous threats to his life and safety. He was offered police protection by the Colombian government, which he refused. In 1997, two of his fellow researches at CINEP, Mario Calderón and Elsa Alvarado, were killed by a paramilitary gang and, in 1999, his superiors in the Catholic Church ordered him to leave Colombia for his safety; he temporarily took up residence in California.

Giraldo opposed Colombian president Álvaro Uribe, whom he accused of recruiting paramilitary groups and spying on the opposition. After the American Georgetown University gave the former president a teaching job, Giraldo criticized them and sent a letter alleging his government "committed crimes against humanity" which "would imply a need for moral censure before entrusting him with any future responsibility"; the letter was signed by over 100 scholars. Uribe, conversely, accused Giraldo of working for criminal organizations and called him "a useful idiot".

Cases Giraldo documented included the 2005 San José de Apartadó massacre, the 1988–1991 massacres in Trujillo, and the 1985 disappearance of 11 people which, due to Giraldo's evidence, resulted in a 30-year prison sentence for a former army colonel.

=== San José de Apartadó Peace Community ===
In 1997, Giraldo began working with the newly founded San José de Apartadó Peace Community. In his role at the Inter-Church Commission, he worked as an advisor to the community and documented abuses and killings against its members, including the 2005 massacre. Giraldo accused Colombian military officials of participating in the massacres and presented evidence implicating them.

In his 2010 book Fusil o toga. Toga y fusil, Giraldo documented 210 assassinations in the Peace Community.

=== Camilo Torres Restrepo and search for remains ===
Giraldo was inspired in his activism by the Catholic priest and revolutionary Camilo Torres Restrepo, whom he met once before Torres's killing in 1966. Starting in the 1960s, Giraldo participated in the search and campaigned for the return of Torres's remains. In February 2026, shortly before his own death, Giraldo was given Torres's remains by Álvaro Valencia Tovar, an official with the Unidad de Búsqueda de Personas dadas por Desaparecidas.

== Death ==
Giraldo died at the San Ignacio Hospital in Bogotá, on 25 August 2026, at the age of 82, after experiencing a fall at his residence.

== Bibliography ==
Giraldo wrote multiple texts on conflicts in Colombia.

- Colombia: The Genocidal Democracy (English ed.). Common Courage Press. 1996. ISBN 1-56751-086-8. With a forward by Noam Chomsky.
- Aquellas muertes que hicieron resplandecer la vida. 1992.
- Guerra o Democracia. 2003.
- El Paramilitarismo en Colombia. 2004.
- Seis experiencias de Posconflicto. 2004.
- Derechos Humanos y Cristianismo. Editorial El Búho. 2008.
- Giraldo, Javier (2010). Fusil o toga. Toga y fusil. J. Giraldo Moreno. ISBN 978-958-752-007-1.
- Víctor Carranza, alias "El patrón" [Víctor Carranza, alias "The Boss"]. 2012. Co-written with Iván Cepeda.
- Camilo entonces y ahora. 2016.
- En las entrañas del genocidio. CINEP. 2019. ISBN 978-958-644-242-8.
- Jadeos desde el fondo del lodazal. Editorial El Búho. 2022.
- Revisión de episodios del genocidio estructural. Editorial El Búho. 2022.
- Camilo ayer y hoy. Industrial University of Santander. 2023.
- Derechos Humanos Diagnóstico y Conceptos. Industrial University of Santander. 2023.
