= Aurel Braun =

Romanian-Canadian academic (born 1947)

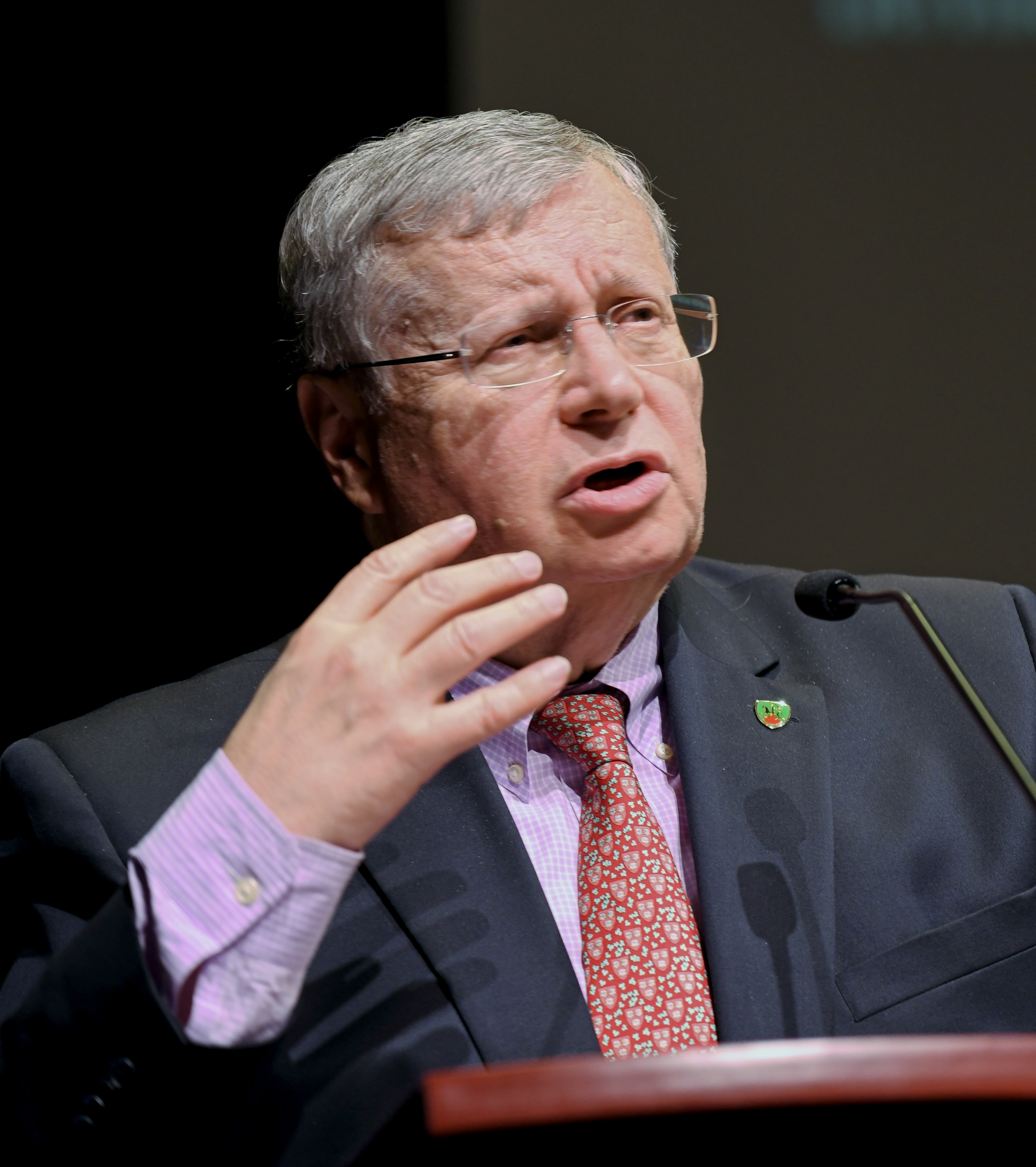
- Born: October 18, 1947 (age 79); Romania
- Citizenship: Canadian
- Spouse: Juliana Borsa (d. 2009)
- Children: 2
- Awards: Queen Elizabeth II Diamond Jubilee Medal

Academic background
- Education: University of Toronto, London School of Economics

Academic work
- Discipline: International Relations, Political Science
- Institutions: University of Toronto, University of Western Ontario
- Website: https://www.utm.utoronto.ca/political-science/people/aurel-braun

Aurel Braun (born October 18, 1947) is a professor of international relations and political science at the University of Toronto. He is also a senior member of the Center for Eurasian, Russian, and East European Studies and of the Centre for International Studies, and a fellow and senator of Trinity College at the University of Toronto. Braun has been twice appointed as a visiting scholar at the Hoover Institution, Stanford University. Braun received his Ph.D. in international relations from the London School of Economics. He is a Canadian citizen.

== Writing ==
Braun has published extensively on communist affairs and strategic studies with a special focus on the problems of the transformation of the socialist systems in the former Soviet Union and in Eastern Europe. He is also a specialist in international law. He is the author and/or editor of several books. His project on "The Russian Diaspora and the Prospect for Large-Scale Violence" was published by the Council on Foreign Relations in New York.

=== Selected works ===
- NATO-Russia Relations in the 21st Century, Routledge, New York, NY and London, UK, 2008.
- Dilemmas of Transition, Rowman and Littlefield, Lahnam, MD, New York, NY and Oxford, UK, Fall 1999.
- The Extreme Right: Freedom and Security At Risk (with Stephen Scheinberg), Westview Press, Boulder, CO and Oxford, UK, 1997.
- The Soviet-East European Relationship in the Gorbachev Era: The Prospects for Adaptation, Westview Press, Boulder, CO and Oxford, UK, 1990.
- The Middle East in Global Strategy, Westview Press, Boulder CO and Mansell Publishing, London, UK, 1987.
- Small State Security in the Balkans, Macmillan, New York, NY and London, UK, 1983).
- Ceausescu: The Problems of Power, Canadian Institute of International Affairs, Toronto, 1980.
- Romanian Foreign Policy Since 1965: The Political and Military Limits of Autonomy, Praeger, New York, NY, 1978.
- Mandelbaum, Michael, and Aurel Braun. "The dawn of peace in Europe." International Journal 52, no. 2 (1997): 380.

== Lecturing ==
Braun has lectured widely in Canada, the United States, Britain, France, Germany, Belgium, Italy, Switzerland, Russia, Austria and Norway. He is the winner of the PECSU Award for Teaching Excellence at the University of Toronto. He has appeared frequently on national television and radio. He has also participated in the Congressional Program in the United States under the auspices of the Aspen Institute.

== Government service ==
In January 2009, Braun was named chairman of the board of directors of the International Centre for Human Rights and Democratic Development for a three-year term. The organization was dissolved in 2012 after conflict between the Board and the Staff of the agency.
