= Yan Christian Warinussy =

Indonesian lawer and human-rights activist

Yan Christian Warinussy is an Indonesian lawyer and human rights activist. He is a director of the Legal Aid, Research, Investigation and Development Institute (Lembaga Penelitian, Pengkajian dan Pengembangan Bantuan Hukum, LP3BH). He works with indigenous Papuans displaced from their lands by non-Papuan settlements or the expansion of multinational mining or oil companies in Indonesia's Papua region.

His work was recognized with the 2005 John Humphrey Freedom Award, which cited his work in "shedding light on gross human rights violations in West Papua and defending people whose rights are ignored, despite repeated intimidation and threats to his personal safety."
