= San José de Apartadó massacre =

- San José de Apartadó massacre (Colombia)
- Location: San José de Apartadó, municipality of Apartadó, Antioquia; Colombia
- Date: 21–22 February 2005
- Target: Civilians
- Attack type: shooting, mass murder, massacre
- Weapon: small arms
- Deaths: 8
- Perpetrators: Colombian Army; AUC

The San José de Apartadó massacre was a massacre of five adults and three children near the small Colombian village of San José de Apartadó more specifically in two places known as "Mulatos" and "La Resbalosa" perpetrated by members of the Military of Colombia and United Self-Defense Forces of Colombia between February 21–22, 2005.

The Peace Community was established on Palm Sunday, March 1997, the villagers declaring themselves neutral in the Colombian armed conflict.

Luis Eduardo Guerra, a leader in the group, and his family were killed in the incident.

On November 23, 2007, the Attorney General of Colombia ordered the detention of a Colombian National Army Captain, Guillermo Armando Gordillo Sánchez, accused of being the mastermind and perpetrator of the San José de Apartadó massacre. Gordillo-Sánchez was in charge of the unit assigned to the 17th Brigade of the Colombian National Army. On July 18, 2008, the Attorney General signed the complaint against nine military officials for grave violations of human rights and facilitation of the incursion of the United Self-Defense Forces, who carried out the massacre.

== See also ==
- List of massacres in Colombia
- Javier Giraldo
