= History of FARC =

History of Colombian guerrilla movement

The Revolutionary Armed Forces of Colombia (FARC–EP) was a Marxist–Leninist revolutionary guerrilla organization based in Colombia, which is involved in the ongoing Colombian armed conflict.

FARC–EP is a peasant army which has proclaimed itself as a revolutionary agrarian, anti-imperialist Marxist–Leninist organization of Bolivarian inspiration. It claims to represent the rural poor in a struggle against Colombia's wealthier classes, and opposes United States influence in Colombia (e.g. Plan Colombia), neo-imperialism, monopolization of natural resources by multinational corporations, and paramilitary/government violence.

== La Violencia and the National Front ==
There is more repression of individual freedom here than in any country we've been to, the police patrol the streets carrying rifles and demand your papers every few minutes ... the atmosphere here is tense, and it seems a revolution may be brewing. The countryside is in open revolt, and the army is powerless to suppress it.

— Ernesto Che Guevara, in a letter to his mother from Colombia, written July 6, 1952

Following the murder of populist politician and Liberal leader Jorge Eliécer Gaitán, in 1948, large-scale violence broke out in what became known as La Violencia ("The Violence"), which lasted until about 1958. More than 300,000 people were killed in the violence, the large majority of whom were peasants and wage laborers living in rural areas.

In 1958, Liberal and Conservative party elites, together with Church and business leaders negotiated an agreement that created an exclusively bipartisan political alternation system, known as the National Front. The two parties agreed to hold elections, but to alternate power between the two parties, regardless of the election results. They decided that the pact would remain in effect until 1974 (however, it lasted with only minor modifications until 1990). This enabled a consolidation of power amongst Colombian Conservative and Liberal elites, while simultaneously strengthening the military and preventing radical political alternatives and popular reforms.

During the 1960s, under a plan known as "Accelerated Economic Development", conceived by a wealthy Canadian rancher Lauchlin Currie (who had extensive landholdings in Colombia), the Colombian government began to pursue the policy of promoting large-scale industrial farms producing for export, rather than small farms producing for local consumption. The government heavily subsidized large-scale industrial farm owners, while violently forcing peasants off of their land, claiming that they were using it "inefficiently". A very large number of small landholders were pushed off of their land, and forced to migrate to urban centers, where they formed a cheap labor pool for the burgeoning industrial economy in the Colombian cities. By 1969, there were over 400,000 landless families in Colombia, with an annual increase of 40,000 per year since 1961. By 1970, latifundio (large farms of over 50 hectares), held approximately 77% of the land in Colombia. In 1971, 70% of the farmland in Colombia was owned by 5.7% of the population. Much of this land was consolidated in the hands of urban industrialists—which had seen marked increases in profits due to the influx of landless, displaced peasants, willing to work for very low wages—and cattle ranchers. Malnutrition and lack of basic medical care were almost universal amongst rural workers in the early 1960s, leading to extremely high rates of preventable disease and infant mortality.

== PCC and self-defense communities ==
Communists were active throughout rural and urban Colombia in the period immediately following World War I. The Colombian Communist Party (Partido Comunista Colombiano, PCC) was formally accredited by the Comintern in 1930. The PCC began establishing "peasant leagues" in rural areas and "popular fronts" in urban areas, calling for improved living and working conditions, education, and rights for the working class. These groups began networking together to present a defensive front against the state-supported violence of large landholders. Members organized strikes, protests, seizures of land, and organized communist-controlled "self-defense communities" in southern Colombia that were able to resist state military forces, while providing for the subsistence needs of the populace. Many of the PCC's attempts at organizing peasants, were met with violent repression by the Colombian government, and landowning class. U.S. military intelligence estimates estimated that in 1962, the size of the PCC had grown to 8,000 to 10,000 active members, and an additional 28,000 supporters.

In 1961, a guerrilla leader and long-time PCC organizer named Manuel Marulanda Vélez declared an independent "Republic of Marquetalia". The Lleras government attempted unsuccessfully to attack the communities to drive out the guerrillas, due to fears that "a Cuban-style revolutionary situation might develop". After the failed attacks, several army outposts were set up in the area.

== Plan Lazo ==
In October 1959, the United States sent a "Special Survey Team" composed of counterinsurgency experts to investigate Colombia's internal security situation. Among other policy recommendations the US team advised that "in order to shield the interests of both Colombian and US authorities against 'interventionist' charges any special aid given for internal security was to be sterile and covert in nature." In February 1962, three years after the 1959 "US Special Survey Team", a Fort Bragg top-level U.S. Special Warfare team headed by Special Warfare Center commander General William P. Yarborough, visited Colombia for a second survey.

In a secret supplement to his report to the Joint Chiefs of Staff, Yarborough encouraged the creation and deployment of a paramilitary force to commit sabotage and terrorist acts against communists:

A concerted country team effort should be made now to select civilian and military personnel for clandestine training in resistance operations in case they are needed later. This should be done with a view toward development of a civil and military structure for exploitation in the event the Colombian internal security system deteriorates further. This structure should be used to pressure toward reforms known to be needed, perform counter-agent and counter-propaganda functions and as necessary execute paramilitary, sabotage and/or terrorist activities against known communist proponents. It should be backed by the United States.

The new counter-insurgency policy was instituted as Plan Lazo in 1962 and called for both military operations and civic action programs in violent areas. Following Yarborough's recommendations, the Colombian military recruited civilians into paramilitary "civil defense" groups which worked alongside the military in its counter-insurgency campaign, as well as in civilian intelligence networks to gather information on guerrilla activity. Doug Stokes argues that it was not until the early part of the 1980s that the Colombian government attempted to move away from the counterinsurgency strategy represented by Plan Lazo and Yarborough's 1962 recommendations.

At the behest of the United States, the Colombian government began attacking many of the self-defense communities in the early 1960s, attempting to re-assimilate the territories under the control of the national government. FARC was formed in 1964 by Manuel Marulanda Vélez and other PCC members, after a military attack on the community of Marquetalia. 16,000 Colombian troops, backed by the U.S., attacked the village of 1,000 inhabitants, only 48 of whom were armed. Marulanda and 47 others fought against government forces at Marquetalia, and then escaped into the mountains along with the other fighters. These 48 men formed the core of FARC, which quickly grew in size to hundreds of fighters.

== Seventh Guerrilla Conference of the FARC–EP ==
In 1982, FARC–EP held its Seventh Guerrilla Conference, which called for a major shift in FARC's strategy. FARC had historically been doing most of its fighting in rural areas, and was limited to small-scale confrontations with Colombian military forces. By 1982, increased income from the "coca boom" allowed them to expand into an irregular army, which would then stage large scale attacks on Colombian troops. They also began sending fighters to Vietnam and the Soviet Union for advanced military training. They also planned to move closer to middle-sized cities, as opposed to only remote rural areas, and closer to areas rich in natural resources, in order to create a strong economic infrastructure. It was also at this conference that FARC added the initials "EP", for "Ejército del Pueblo" or "People's Army", to the organization's name.

== Entrance into coca trade ==
That they try to present me as an associate of the guerrilla ... hurts my personal dignity ... I am a man of investments and therefore I cannot sympathize with the guerrillas who fight against property.

— Pablo Escobar, head of the Medellin Cartel

Initially, the FARC–EP rejected any involvement in the emerging phenomenon of drug growing and trafficking, but during the 1980s the group gradually came to accept it as it became a burgeoning business. Taxes on drug producers and traffickers were introduced as a source of funding in the form of the compulsory so-called "gramaje" tax on growers and through the enforcement of other regulations affecting different stages of the production process.

A 1992 Central Intelligence Agency report "acknowledged that the FARC had become increasingly involved in drugs through their 'taxing' of the trade in areas under their geographical control and that in some cases the insurgents protected trafficking infrastructure to further fund their insurgency," but also described the relationship between the FARC and the drug traffickers as one "characterized by both cooperation and friction" and concluded that "we do not believe that the drug industry [in Colombia] would be substantially disrupted in the short term by attacks against guerrillas. Indeed, many traffickers would probably welcome, and even assist, increased operations against insurgents."

In 1994, the DEA came to three similar conclusions. First, that any connections between drug trafficking organizations and Colombian insurgents were "ad hoc 'alliances of convenience'". Second, that "the independent involvement of insurgents in Colombia's domestic drug productions, transportation, and distribution is limited...there is no evidence that the national leadership of either the FARC or the ELN has directed, as a matter of policy, that their respective organizations directly engage in independent illicit drug production, transportation, or distribution." Third, the report determined that the DEA "has no evidence that the FARC or ELN have been involved in the transportation, distribution, or marketing of illegal drugs in the United States. Furthermore it is doubtful that either insurgent group could develop the international transportation and logistics infrastructure necessary to establish independent drug distribution in the United States or Europe... DEA believes that the insurgents never will be major players in Colombia's drug trade."

== La Uribe Agreement and Union Patriótica ==
In the early 1980s, President Belisario Betancur began discussing the possibility of peace talks with the guerrillas. Ultimately this resulted in the 1984 La Uribe Agreement, which called for a cease-fire, which ended up lasting from 1984 to 1987.

In 1985, members of the FARC–EP, along with a large number of other leftist and communist groups, formed a political party known as the Union Patriótica ("Patriotic Union", UP). The UP sought political reforms (known as Apertura Democratica) such as constitutional reform, more democratic local elections, political decentralization, and ending the domination of Colombian politics by the Liberal and Conservative parties. They also pursued socio-economic reforms such land redistribution, greater health and education spending, the nationalization of foreign businesses, Colombian banks, and transportation, and greater public access to mass media. While many members of the UP were involved with the FARC–EP, the large majority of them were not and came from a wide variety of backgrounds such as labor unions and socialist parties such as the PCC. In the cities, the FARC–EP began integrating itself with the UP and forming Juntas Patrióticas (or "solidarity cells") – small groups of people associated with labor unions, student activist groups, and peasant leagues, who travelled into the barrios discussing social problems, building support for the UP, and determining the socio-political stance of the urban peasantry.

The UP performed better in elections than any other leftist party in Colombia's history. In 1986, UP candidates won 350 local council seats, 23 deputy positions in departmental assemblies, 9 seats in the House, and 6 seats in the Senate. The 1986 Presidential candidate, Jaime Pardo Leal, won 4.6% of the national vote.

Between 1986 and 1990, thousands of members of the UP and other leftist parties were murdered (estimates range from 4,000 to 6,000). In 1987, the President of the UP, Jaime Pardo, was murdered. In 1989 a single large landholder had over 400 UP members murdered. Over 70% of all Colombian presidential candidates in 1990—and 100% of those from center-left parties—were assassinated.

== Simón Bolívar Guerrilla Coordinating Board (CGSB) ==
By 1985, the major guerrilla groups (EPL, FARC–EP, M-19, and ELN) had come together under an umbrella organization known as the Guerrilla Coordinating Board (CNG). This group evolved in 1987 into the Simón Bolívar Guerrilla Coordinating Board (CGSB), which led negotiations between the numerous guerrilla groups and the government. While the CGSB did achieve some of its goals, its success was very limited. The CGSB's initiative led to the successful peace process with the M-19. The FARC–EP and ELN, on the other hand, decided to continue their struggle.

== 1990–1998 ==
During this period, the Colombian government continued its negotiations with the FARC–EP and other armed groups, some of which were successful. Some of the groups which demobilized at this time include the (EPL, the ERP, the Quintín Lame Armed Movement, and the M-19).

Towards the end of 1990, the army, with no advance warning and while negotiations were still ongoing with the group, attacked a compound known as Casa Verde, which housed the National Secretariat of the FARC–EP. The Colombian government argued that the attack was caused by the FARC–EP's lack of commitment to the process, since the organization was continuing its criminal activities.

On August 10, 1990, senior leader Jacobo Arenas, an ideological leader and founder of FARC–EP, died of a heart attack.

On June 3, 1991, dialogue resumed between the Coordinating Board and the government on neutral territory in Caracas, Venezuela and Tlaxcala, Mexico. However, the war did not stop, and armed attacks by both sides continued. The negotiation process was broken off in 1993 after no agreement was reached. The Coordinating Board disappeared not long after that time, and guerrilla groups continued their activities independently.

Before the break off of dialogue, a letter written by a group of Colombian intellectuals (among whom were Nobel laureate Gabriel García Márquez) to the Simón Bolívar Guerrilla Coordinating Board was released denouncing the approach taken by the FARC–EP and the dire consequences that it was having for the country.

Beginning in 1996, FARC–EP began applying a new military strategy involving multi-front attacks on military objectives, and the use of both 61mm and 80mm mortars and of homemade mortars known as "cylinder bombs" (the use of which has been condemned by many, due to their inaccuracy and potential for causing collateral damage). This resulted in a series of major military victories over Colombian government forces.

On August 30, 1996, the FARC–EP staged a surprise attack on a Colombian military base in Las Delicias, Putumayo. Within 15 hours, the base had been completely destroyed, w/ 54 Colombian soldiers killed, 17 wounded, and 60 taken hostage. The 60 hostages were released in June 1997. In March 1998, in southern Caquetá, with the help of local sympathizers and informants, FARC–EP forces annihilated an elite Colombian army unit, the 52nd counterguerrilla battalion of the 3rd Mobile Brigade. A force of 600–800 guerrillas attacked the battalion, and by the end of the engagement, 104 of the battalion's 154 men had been killed. In November 1998, FARC–EP forces overran the provincial capital Mitú, located in Vaupés near the border with Brazil. The Colombian government was unable to retake Mitú until three days later, after officials received permission to land Colombian troops in Brazilian military bases across the border.

Over this period in Colombia the cultivation of different drugs expanded and there were widespread coca farmers' marches. These marches brought to a halt several major arteries in southern Colombia in which the government claimed there was FARC–EP involvement, although it has not been fully investigated what, if any, specific involvement the group had.

== Andrés Pastrana's Presidency (1998–2002) ==
In March 1999 members of a local FARC contingent killed 3 indigenous rights activists, who were working with the U'Wa people to build a school for U'Wa children, and were fighting against encroachment of U'Wa territory by multinational oil corporations. The killings were almost universally condemned, and seriously harmed public perceptions of FARC.

=== 1999–2002 Peace Process ===
With the hope of negotiating a peace settlement, on November 7, 1998, President Andrés Pastrana granted FARC–EP a 42,000 km^{2} (16,200 sq mi) safe haven meant to serve as a confidence building measure, centered around the San Vicente del Caguán settlement.

The demilitarization of this area had been among the FARC–EP's conditions for beginning peace talks. The peace process with the government continued at a slow pace for three years during which the BBC and other news organizations reported that the FARC–EP also used the safe haven to import arms, export drugs, recruit minors, and build up their armed forces.

After a series of high-profile guerrilla terrorist actions, including the hijacking of an aircraft, the attack on several small towns and cities, the arrest of the Irish Colombia Three (see below), the alleged training of FARC–EP militants in bomb making by them, and the kidnapping of several political figures, Pastrana ended the peace talks on February 21, 2002, and ordered the armed forces to start retaking the FARC–EP controlled zone, beginning at midnight. A 48-hour respite that had been previously agreed to with the rebel group was not respected as the government argued that it had already been granted during an earlier crisis in January, when most of the more prominent FARC–EP commanders had apparently left the demilitarized zone. Shortly after the end of talks, the FARC–EP kidnapped Oxygen Green Party presidential candidate Ingrid Betancourt, who was traveling in guerrilla territory. Betancourt was rescued by the Colombian government on July 2, 2008 (see Operation Jaque below).

=== The Colombia Three case ===
On April 24, 2001, the House of Representatives Committee on International Relations published the findings of its investigation into IRA activities in Colombia. Their report alleged a longstanding connection between the IRA and FARC–EP, mentioned at least 15 IRA members who had been traveling in and out of Colombia since 1998, and estimated that the IRA had received at least $2 million in drug proceeds for training FARC–EP members. The IRA/FARC–EP connection was first made public on August 11, 2001, following the arrest in Bogotá of two IRA explosives and urban warfare experts and of a representative of Sinn Féin who was known to be stationed in Cuba. Jim Monaghan, Martin McCauley and Niall Connolly (known as the Colombia Three), were arrested in Colombia in August 2001 and were accused of teaching bomb-making methods to FARC–EP.

On February 15, 2002, the Colombia Three were charged with training FARC–EP members in bomb-making in Colombia. The Colombian authorities had received satellite footage, probably supplied by the CIA, of the men with FARC–EP in an isolated jungle area, where they are thought to have spent the last five weeks. They could have spent up to 20 years in jail if the allegations were proved.

They were eventually found guilty of traveling on false passports in June 2004, but were acquitted of training FARC–EP members. That decision was reversed after an appeal by the Attorney General of Colombia and they were sentenced to 17-year terms. However, they vanished in December 2004 while on bail and returned to Ireland. Tánaiste Mary Harney said no deal had been done with Sinn Féin or the IRA over the three's return to Ireland adding that the Irish government would consider any request from the Colombian authorities for their extradition. Colombian vice-president Francisco Santos Calderón did not rule out allowing them to serve their sentences in Ireland.

== Álvaro Uribe's Presidency (2002–2010) ==
=== 2002–2005 period ===
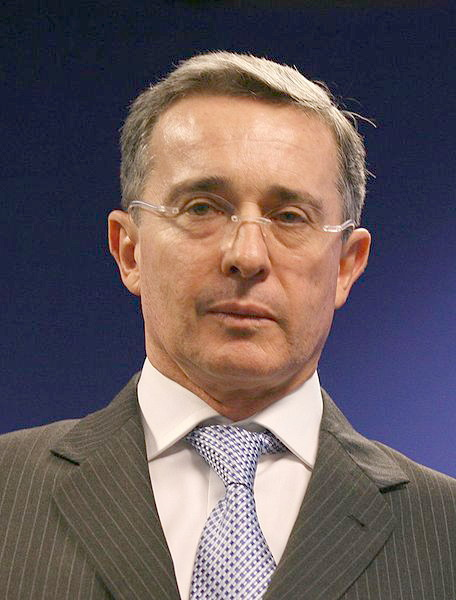
Álvaro Uribe, president of Colombia from 2002 to 2010

For most of the period between 2002 and 2005, the FARC–EP was believed to be in a strategic withdrawal due to the increasing military and police actions of new president Álvaro Uribe, which led to the capture or desertion of many fighters and medium-level commanders. Uribe ran for office on an anti-FARC–EP platform and was determined to defeat FARC–EP in a bid to create "confidence" in the country. Uribe's own father had been killed by FARC–EP in an attempted kidnapping in 1983.

In 2002 and 2003, FARC broke up ten large ranches in Meta, an eastern Colombian province, and distributed the land to local subsistence farmers.

On July 13, 2004, the office of the United Nations' High Commissioner for Human Rights publicly condemned the group, accusing the FARC–EP of violating article 17 of the additional Protocol II of the Geneva Convention and international humanitarian law, as a result of the July 10 massacre of seven peasants and the subsequent displacement of eighty individuals in San Carlos, Antioquia.

In early February 2005, a series of small scale military actions by the FARC–EP around the southwestern departments of Colombia, resulted in an estimated 40 casualties. The FARC–EP, in response to government military operations in the south and in the southeast, would now be displacing its military center of gravity towards the Nariño, Putumayo and Cauca departments.

=== Hostage releases ===
During Uribe's presidency, there were numerous hostage releases, rescues, and escapes.

Notable releases include: two policemen in Putamayo; German hostage Lothar Hintze; the January 10, 2008, release of former vice presidential candidate Clara Rojas and former congresswoman Consuelo González, which was a deal brokered by the government of Venezuela; the January 31, 2008, release of Luis Eladio Perez Bonilla, Gloria Polanco, and Orlando Beltran Cuellar in another deal brokered by Venezuelan President Hugo Chávez; the December 21, 2008, release of Alan Jara, Sigifredo López, three low-ranking police officers and a low-ranking soldier; the March 17, 2009, of Swedish hostage Erik Roland Larsson. The March 2010 release of Professional Soldier Josue Daniel Calvo Sanchez and Corporal Second Class Pablo Emilio Moncayo Cabrera.

Several hostages also died or were killed during captivity, including: Julian Ernesto Guevara Castro, a Police Captain, who died of tuberculosis on January 28, 2006.; the killing of 11 out of 12 provincial deputies from the Valle del Cauca Department whom the guerrillas had kidnapped in 2002. The FARC–EP claimed that they were killed in the crossfire of a gun battle, while the Colombian government and Red Cross claim that they were killed by FARC–EP; the killing of Luis Francisco Cuellar, the Governor of Caquetá, who had been kidnapped to be put on trial for corruption. and had his throat slit while FARC was fleeing from government military forces

Notable escapes and raids include: Fernando Araújo, who was later named Minister of Foreign Relations and formerly Development Minister, and who escaped his captors on December 31, 2006; the escape of Colombian Conservative Party congressman Óscar Tulio Lizcano, on October 26, 2008; a July 2, 2008, Colombian military operation called Operation Jaque, where the FARC–EP was tricked by the Colombian Government into releasing 15 hostages to Colombian Intelligence agents disguised as journalists and international aid workers in a helicopter rescue; the June 13, 2010, raid which released Police Colonel Luis Herlindo Mendieta Ovalle, Police Captain Enrique Murillo Sanchez, Police Lieutenante William Donato Gomez and Army Staff Sergeant Arbey Delgado Argote.

=== Hugo Chávez's call to stop branding FARC–EP as terrorists ===
Venezuelan President Hugo Chávez urged European and Latin American governments on January 11, 2008, to stop branding Colombia's guerrillas as terrorists, a day after welcoming two hostages released by the rebels. "I am asking the governments (across Latin America) to take the FARC–EP and ELN (National Liberation Army) off their lists of global terrorist groups", Chávez told the National Assembly. His plea was futile: Colombian President Álvaro Uribe was quick to respond, ruling out any change in the FARC–EP's or ELN's status. Álvaro Uribe later issued a statement saying the insurgents are indeed terrorists who fund their operations with cocaine smuggling, recruit children and plant land mines in their effort to topple a democratically elected government.

=== Anti-FARC rallies ===
On February 4, 2008, several rallies were held in Colombia and in other locations around the world, criticizing FARC–EP for kidnapping and violence and demanding the liberation of hundreds of hostages. Participation estimates vary from the hundreds of thousands to several millions of people in Colombia and thousands worldwide. The protests were originally organized through the popular social networking site Facebook by a 33-year-old engineer, Oscar Morales, from his home in Barranquilla. Morales, along with other young professionals created a Facebook group called "Million Voices against the FARC", which quickly gained over 200,000 members from around the world. Morales was irritated with Hugo Chávez's suggestion that FARC–EP should be taken off of the European Union's list of international terrorist organizations and treated as a legitimate army. The organizing for the protests was also supported by local Colombian media outlets as well as the Colombian government.

President Uribe expressed "gratitude to all Colombians who today have expressed, with dignity and strength, the rejection of kidnapping and of the kidnappers." Vice President Francisco Santos said that if the FARC continued their practices of kidnapping, that they would be politically marginalized. Supporters included freed hostage Clara Rojas, 2002 running mate for Ingrid Betancourt, who said "I hope FARC is listening". Former hostage Luis Eladio Perez, who still remained in captivity at the time of the protest, remarked after his liberation that the rallies allowed those imprisoned by FARC to "feel the solidarity of Colombians for the first time". Opposition Senator Gustavo Petro, after meeting with rally organizers and inquiring as to why the protest didn't address the actions of other violent actors such as the AUC paramilitaries and ELN guerrillas, acknowledged the protest march as a "democratic expression" of the citizenry against FARC and against kidnappings.

Shortly before the rallies took place thirteen demobilized AUC paramilitary leaders, including Salvatore Mancuso, had expressed their support of the protest through a communique. However, this move was rejected by organizer Carlos Andrés Santiago, who stated that such an endorsement was harmful and criticized the AUC's actions.

Critics have argued that the protests were primarily by upper-class Colombians, promoted and supported by government or business elites and also involved right-wing paramilitaries. The exclusive focus on FARC, instead of also criticizing the actions of the government and government-aligned paramilitaries responsible for many of the conflict's atrocities, was also questioned. Astrid Betancourt, sister of Ingrid Betancourt, condemned the march as a "manipulation" saying "it's propaganda, which while pretending to be against the FARC is completely organised by the government". Others said that right-wing paramilitary leaders played a role organizing the protests, businesses and government offices shut down for the day, bosses pressured workers to attend the gatherings and the mass media gave free advertising to the mobilization.

Neumayer and Raffl of the University of Salzburg ICT&S Center have argued that since the protest was primarily organized via Facebook and only 1 out of 5 Colombians were estimated to have regular access to the Internet in 2007, the movement would have been more representative of upper class sentiments than those of Colombians who lack such access. They also mention that the protests tended to take place in wealthier cities and nations as measured by the Human Development Index, in Colombia itself and worldwide, thus claiming that "even in geographical terms the protest was formed by a global elite". They acknowledged that the anti-FARC rallies were an example of how social software can "enhance political activism from a local to a worldwide scale" but also pointed out that the use of social networks remains a "privilege" given the "enormous part of the population" that is still excluded from the Internet as a whole.

The opposition Alternative Democratic Pole (Polo Democrático Alternativo) party leadership voted 18 to 3 against participating in the main protest, rejecting an initial proposal by Senator Gustavo Petro, but unanimously accepted his subsequent request to hold a separate rally on the same date with the support of labor unions and human rights organizations. Carlos Gaviria Díaz, President of Polo Democrático said that while the party disapproves of the crimes of FARC, such as kidnapping and extortion, they also did not support the decision of the protest organizers to avoid criticizing the crimes of the paramilitary groups and the government, citing murders of teachers and trade union leaders and millions of people who have been displaced.

On July 20, 2008, a subsequent set of rallies against FARC included thousands of Colombians in Bogotá and hundreds of thousands throughout the rest of the country.

=== Death of Raúl Reyes ===
On March 1, 2008, the Colombian military attacked a FARC–EP camp inside Ecuador's territory, resulting in the death of over 20 people, with at least 17 of them being FARC–EP guerillas. Raúl Reyes was among the dead, along with at least 16 of his fellow guerrillas. Raúl Reyes was FARC–EP's international spokesman and hostage release negotiator and considered to be FARC–EP's second-in-command. This incident led to a breakdown in diplomatic relations between Ecuador and Colombia, and between Venezuela and Colombia. Ecuador condemned the attack.

This is considered the biggest blow against FARC–EP in its more than four decades of existence. This event was quickly followed by the death of Ivan Rios, another member of FARC–EP's seven-man Secretariat, less than a week later, by the hand of his own bodyguard. It came as a result of heavy Colombian military pressure and a reward offer of up to $5 million from the Colombian government.

=== Death of Manuel Marulanda Vélez ===
Manuel Marulanda Vélez died on March 26, 2008, after a heart attack. His death would be kept a secret, until Colombian magazine, Revista Semana, published an interview with Colombian defense minister Juan Manuel Santos on May 24, 2008, in which Santos mentions the death of Manuel Marulanda Vélez. The news was confirmed by FARC–EP-commander 'Timochenko' on Latin American television station teleSUR on May 25, 2008. 'Timochenko' announced the new commander in chief is 'Alfonso Cano' After speculations in several national and international media about the 'softening up' of the FARC and the announcement of Colombian President Álvaro Uribe that several FARC-leaders were ready to surrender and liberate hostages, the secretariat of the FARC sent out a communiqué emphasizing the death of their founder would not change their approach towards the hostages or the humanitarian agreement.

=== Hugo Chávez's call to disarm ===
On January 13, 2008, Venezuelan President Hugo Chávez stated his disapproval with the FARC–EP strategy of armed struggle and kidnapping, saying "I don't agree with kidnapping and I don't agree with armed struggle". On March 7 at the Cumbre de Rio, Chavez stated again that the FARC–EP should lay down their arms "Look at what has happened and is happening in Latin America, reflect on this (FARC–EP), we are done with war ... enough with all this death". On June 8 Chavez repeated his call for a political solution and an end to the war, "The guerrilla war is history ... At this moment in Latin America, an armed guerrilla movement is out of place".

=== Death of Alfonso Cano ===
On November 4, 2011, Colombian forces successfully attacked a FARC base in the jungle of the Cacua Department during "Operation Odysseus" killing FARC leader Alfonso Cano. On November 15, 2011, FARC publicly named Timoleón Jiménez, also known as "Timochenko", as the new leader of FARC's seven-man governing secretariat.

== See also ==
- Paramilitarism in Colombia
- Military Structure of the FARC–EP
- Communism in Colombia
