= CINEP / Peace Program =

Colombian non-profit foundation

Coordinates: 4°37′12.27″N 74°3′54.22″W

- Abbreviation: CINEP/PPP
- Established: 1972; 54 years ago
- Type: Multi-faceted program for peace & human development
- Headquarters: Bogotá, Colombia
- Directora general: Martha Lucía Márquez
- Affiliations: Peacebuilding,Social sciences,Jesuits, Catholic Church
- Website: CINEP

The Fundación Centro de Investigación y Educación Popular / Programa por la Paz (Cinep/PPP) is a Colombian organisation dedicated to researching and accompanying social organisations and communities in the search for the vindication of their rights. It is a leading research school in the social and human sciences in Colombia and the continent.

Since its creation, it has promoted the training of young social scientists in the practice of research with, by and for people. Thus, it brings together various paradigmatic and methodical approaches from the social and human sciences (political, structural, historical, socio-economic, participatory action, educational and social intervention research) together with the documentation and continuous dissemination of information on human rights violations.

== History ==
- In 1944, the National Coordination of Social Action of the Society of Jesus in Colombia was organised, focusing on training leaders and advising popular organisations.
- In 1966, CIAS-CINEP was consolidated as a group of Jesuits and lay people who sought to complement the work of the National Coordination of Social Action with research and teaching., positioning itself as a centre for research and social action.
- In 1972, the legal status of CIAS-CINEP was recognised (Ministry of Justice, Resolution No. 1960 of 1972).
- On 8 October 1976, the amendment to change the name of CIAS to CINEP was accepted.
- In 2000, the Peace Programme of the Society of Jesus, established in 1987, s and integrated CINEP into the Centre for Research and Popular Education/Programme for Peace: Cinep/PPP .

=== Dirección ===
Year	Name	Affiliations	Center's Name
1972-1974	Alejandro Angulo Novoa (SJ)	Society of Jesus	CIAS-CINEP
1975 -1976	Ernesto Parra Escobar (SJ)	Society of Jesus	1975-1976: CIAS-CINEP 1976: CINEP
1977-1982	Alejandro Angulo Novoa (SJ)	Society of Jesus	CINEP
1987 -1993	Francisco de Roux (SJ)	Society of Jesus	CINEP
1994-1998	Gabriel Izquierdo	Society of Jesus	CINEP
1998-2003	Fernán E. González (SJ)	Society of Jesus	1998-2000: CINEP 2000-2003: CINEP/PPP
2004- 2011	Alejandro Angulo Novoa (SJ)	Society of Jesus	CINEP/PPP
2012-2021	Luis Guilllermo Guerrero	N/A	CINEP/PPP
2021	Martha Lucía Márquez	N/A	CINEP/PPP

=== Commemorative publications ===
- Una opción y muchas búsquedas: Cinep 25 años
- 25 años de luchas sociales en Colombia, 1975-2000
- Cinep 40 años. Una apuesta por lo imposible

== Areas of work ==
They are divided into two programmes, each with four lines of work. The first is the Conflict, State and Peace Programme, which comprises the lines of State and Peace Building in Conflict Regions, Ethnic Transitional Justice (before 2024 known as Territorial Management) and Education for Citizenship and Peace. The second is the Mobilisation, Human Rights and Interculturality Programme, which articulates the lines of Social Movements, Land and Territory, Interculturality and Human Rights.

It has also participated in collective processes such as the Colombian Observatory for Integral Development, Citizen Coexistence and Institutional Strengthening (Odecofi), the Peace Programme of the Society of Jesus, and the Development and Peace Programme of Magdalena Medio, among others.

== Library Specialised in Social Sciences ==
The Cinep/PPP Specialized Library in Social Sciences has a bibliographic and audiovisual collection of 39,784 volumes, including books, documents, journals and videos. The library is divided into eight thematic groups: books, documents, magazines and videos.

It is divided into eight thematic groups:

- Cinep/PPP Books
- Cinep/PPP Documents
- General Collection
- General documents
- Jesuit Refugee Service Latin America and the Caribbean Collection
- Reference
- Newspaper library
- Video library

Of the aforementioned groups, three form the Foundation's patrimonial collection: Cinep/PPP books, Cinep/PPP documents and the video library.

== Publishing House ==
Since its consolidation as a CIAS, the centre has participated in the publication of different documents that have allowed it to undertake an editorial project from the Publications Office. The first research papers published allowed the consolidation of themes and issues that ended up becoming Cinep/PPP's lines of work.

Cinep/PPP's catalogue includes:

Type	Known publications
Books	Poder y violencia en Colombia de Fernán González (2014)
Books	Una historia inconclusa: izquierdas políticas y sociales en Colombia de Álvaro Delgado, Jorge Alberto Cote, Martha Cecilia García Velandia, Mauricio Archila Neira, Patricia Madariaga
Books	¿Cuál Estado para cuál ciudadanía? Paradojas y disyunciones de la modernización del Estado en Colombia de Gloria Isabel Ocampo
Journals	Cien Días vistos por Cinep (1988)
Journals	Controversia (1975)
Journals	Noche y niebla (1996)
Documents	Talando la selva y contaminando las aguas de Juan Pablo Guerrero Home, Laura Catalina Tovar Bohórquez, Sonia Cristina Vargas Perdomo
Documents	Tejidos. Mujeres wiwas, territorio y economía propia de Círculo de la Palabra de las Mujeres
Documents	ReconoSiendo. Estrategia pedagógica para la lectura crítica del pasado reciente de Alejandro Arteaga, Ángela Jaramillo, Fernán E. González G., Jefferson Gallego, Jorge Enrique Castro, José Darío Rodríguez Cuadros, S.J., Laura Perdigón, Valeria Zapata
Primers	Ajá ¿y por qué no? Hombres comprometidos con la equidad de género de Coalición de Mujeres del Caribe por la Tierra y el Territorio, María Camila Barrera Gutiérrez, Nyria Ramírez Ortega
Primers	Transformación noviolenta de conflictos sociales en Colombia. Claves de lectura, paradigma de acción y retos estratégicos del Cinep/PPP de Diego Bulla, Juan Carlos Merchán, Laura Constanza Henao
Primers	Does Cerrejón Always Win? Between corporate impunity for human rights violations and the search for comprehensive reparation in times of transition
Occasional documents	Núm. 87. Herramientas pedagógicas significativas para el cambio social de Carlos Krisch, Ivonne Guzmán, Martha Lucía Márquez, Stephany Escobar
Occasional documents	Núm. 86. ¿Reformar la reforma? Aportes para una política de tierras en el siglo XXI de Francisco Gutiérrez-Sanín, Itayosara Rojas Herrera, Martha Carvajalino, Saturnino M. Borras Jr., Sergio Coronado
Occasional documents	Núm. 84. ¿Por qué es tan difícil negociar con el ELN? Una mirada regionalmente diferenciada de Andrés Felipe Aponte G., Charles Larratt Smith, Daniel Ricardo Amaya Alba, Fernán E. González G., Henry Ortega Palacio
