= International Centre for Human Rights and Democratic Development =

Canadian institution (1988–2012)

- Established: 1988
- Last chairman: Aurel Braun
- Staff: 47
- Address: 1001 de Maisonneuve Blvd
- Location: Montreal
- Dissolved: 2012

The International Centre for Human Rights and Democratic Development (Rights & Democracy) was created to be a non-partisan, independent Canadian institution. It was established by an act of the Canadian parliament in 1988 to "encourage and support the universal values of human rights and the promotion of democratic institutions and practices around the world." R&D received around Can$11m per year in funding from the Canadian government.

R&D was charged with working with individuals, organizations, and governments in Canada and abroad to promote the human and democratic rights defined in the United Nations' Universal Declaration of Human Rights (1948). To this end, R&D sought to develop tools for a Human Rights Impact Assessment that could be applied by civil society groups.

== History ==
The Progressive Conservative government of Brian Mulroney established Rights & Democracy as an agency reporting to Parliament under the International Centre for Human Rights and Democratic Development Act of 1988. The founding president was Ed Broadbent, former national leader of the New Democratic Party. Broadbent was succeeded by former Liberal cabinet minister Warren Allmand.

Although a Canadian organization, its mandate was international, centred on the twin goals of the organization's title: international human rights and the development of democracy, especially in less developed countries. Thus, Rights & Democracy held consultative status with the United Nations Economic and Social Council, among other international bodies. It funded projects in North and South America, Africa, East and Southeast Asia, and the Middle East. The organization's activities were outlined in an annual report to the Minister of Foreign Affairs of Canada and to parliament.

== John Humphrey Freedom Award ==
The centre offered an annual prize, called the John Humphrey Freedom Award (named after John Peters Humphrey), to an organization or person from any part of the world, including Canada, for outstanding achievement in promoting democratic development or respect for human rights. The award consisted of a $25,000 (later $30,000) endowment and a speaking tour to Canadian cities to increase the awareness of the laureate's work. Notable winners include Kimy Pernía Domicó (Colombia), Bishop Carlos Filipe Ximenes Belo (East Timor), Cynthia Maung and Min Ko Naing (Burma).

== Controversy ==
After the Harper government declared that, at the UN Durban Review Conference scheduled for Geneva in 2009, Canada would not participate and that no government funds could be used to support the event because the Harper government believed it to be antisemitic. R&D reportedly defied this policy. On October 29, 2009, in a parliamentary hearing of the standing committee on Foreign Affairs, MP James Lunney asked Rémy Beauregard, appointed as R&D's president by the previous Liberal government, "Did Rights and Democracy play any role, directly or indirectly, in planning for or participating in the conference in Durban?" Beauregard replied, "No, we did not," but an R&D staff member reported that during 2008 the organization had, in fact, been actively preparing for this event. Reports also noted that "at least seven R&D employees were working in Geneva" at the time. When Deloitte & Touche audited the funding, it was found that more than $140,000 had been transferred to the OHCHR from R&D funds, but it was "impossible to identify" how the funds had been spent. An article in Maclean's noted that the same year, the federal government had transferred $5,096,840 to the OHCHR without earmarking, so it might also have funded the conference in Durban.

In the midst of these activities and conflicts, the Harper government changed R&D's leadership, naming Professor Aurel Braun, from the University of Toronto, as chair of R&D's board of directors in January 2009. Beauregard immediately clashed with Braun, and the conflicts expanded after Braun was joined on the board by David Matas. After the Durban controversy, board members protested funding to three groups, accusing two of having links to terrorism and the other of being unworthy of funding (one Israeli and two Palestinian) – Al-Haq, Al Mazen, and B'Tselem.

Following a particularly hostile board meeting in January 2010, Beauregard died of a heart attack, and board members Sima Samar, Payam Akhavan and Guido Riveros resigned. Riveros wrote an extensive public letter demanding Braun's resignation. Subsequently, 45 of the centre's 47 staff (some of them hired during Beauregard's tenure) called for Braun's resignation, accusing him of "a pattern of harassment". Suggesting a conspiracy that resulted in the heart attack, four hold-over members of the board requested "a full investigation of the circumstances surrounding Mr. Beauregard's death, with a focus on the role and conduct of the board". A Report of the Foreign Affairs Committee of the Canadian House of Commons recommended several reforms in the Board of Directors of Rights and Democracy and found several aspects of the controversy "unclear and disputed". It nonetheless included among its recommendations that "the current Board of Rights and Democracy issue an apology to Mr. Beauregard's family for any statements damaging his reputation."

== Closure ==
In April 2012, the Canadian government announced that it would close R&D and transfer the organization's functions to the Department of Foreign Affairs and International Trade. It stated that the closure was due to the controversies surrounding the agency.

Foreign Affairs Minister John Baird said, "For some time, the many challenges of the International Centre for Human Rights and Democratic Development, also known as Rights & Democracy, have been well publicized. It is time to put these past challenges behind us and move forward."

== Presidents ==
Rights & Democracy's chief executive was its president, appointed by the government. Seven presidents held office during the organization's history:

- Ed Broadbent, 1988–1996
- Warren Allmand, 1997–2002
- Jean-Louis Roy, 2002–2007
- Jean-Paul Hubert (interim), November 2007–July 2008
- Rémy Beauregard, July 2008–January 2010
- Jacques Gauthier (interim) January–March 2010
- Gérard Latulippe, March 2010–July 2012
