= Timothy Njoya =

Kenyan theologian and political activist (born 1941)

Timothy Njoya (born 7 April 1941 in Nyeri District) is a theologian, human rights activist and a retired Presbyterian Church of East Africa Minister. Njoya holds Master's and Doctor of Philosophy (PhD) degrees from Princeton University. He was ordained as a minister on 20 March 1967 and has served in different parishes including Chuka, Tumutumu, Mathari, St. Andrews, Dagoretti and Kinoo before his retirement in 2011. In 2017 he published his memoirs titled We the People: Thinking Heavenly, Acting Kenyanly.

== Political activism ==
Rev. Njoya is popularly known for being one of the church leaders who publicly spoke and protested against the autocracy and brutality of the then President Daniel arap Moi in the 1980s and 90s. In his sermons, he advocated for political and social justice reforms in Kenya. In particular, he called for the re-introduction of multiparty democracy and strongly defended the freedom of expression and association as enshrined in the constitution. He was arrested on several occasions as a result of his activism.

Njoya's use of church pulpit as a platform for political activism did not go well with the church leadership that at the time advocated for political neutrality. Njoya condemned the church for remaining silent despite widespread injustices perpetrated by the government. This condemnation saw him subjected to the church disciplinary process before he was transferred from St. Andrews PCEA church in Nairobi to Nyeri in 1987. He nevertheless continued with his activism once he was restored to his position but with more support from the masses that had become more enlightened to the ideas of democracy.

Njoya was one of the leaders of Saba Saba multiparty demonstrations on 7 July 1990 that forced the repressive Moi regime to allow the re-introduction of multi-party state. The demonstrations left eight people dead and many others injured and detained. Njoya was badly beaten by the police.

== Book title ==
In August 2017, Rev Njoya announced that he was launching a book he had finished writing titled "The Divinity of Clitoris". A section of Kenyans found this book controversial considering the fact that Njoya had served as a minister in one of the most conservative denominations in Kenya.

== Personal life ==
Rev. Njoya is married to Leah Wambui Njau and they have five children.
