= Civic action program =

Humanitarian operation

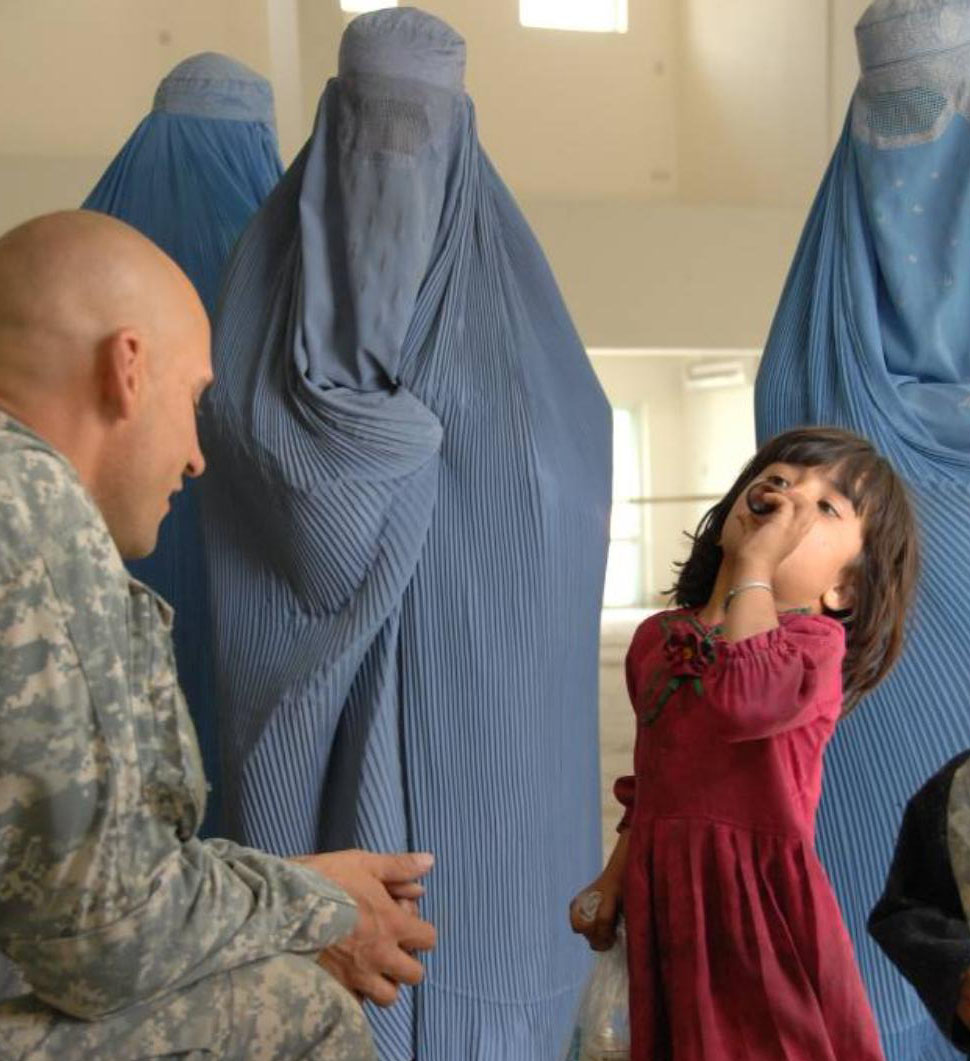
U.S. Army conducts MEDCAP in Afghanistan

A civic action program, also known as civic action project, is a type of operation designed to assist an area by using the capabilities and resources of a military force or civilian organization to conduct long-term programs or short-term projects. This type of operations include: dental civic action program (DENTCAP), engineering civic action program (ENCAP), medical civic action program (MEDCAP), and veterinarian civic action program (VETCAP). Entities of foreign nations usually conduct these operations at the invitation of a host nation.

== Common civic action programs ==
=== Dental civic action program (DENTCAP) ===
Dentists and dental technicians with equipment and supplies set up a temporary field clinic to provide dental treatment to the local population.

=== Engineering civic action program (ENCAP) ===
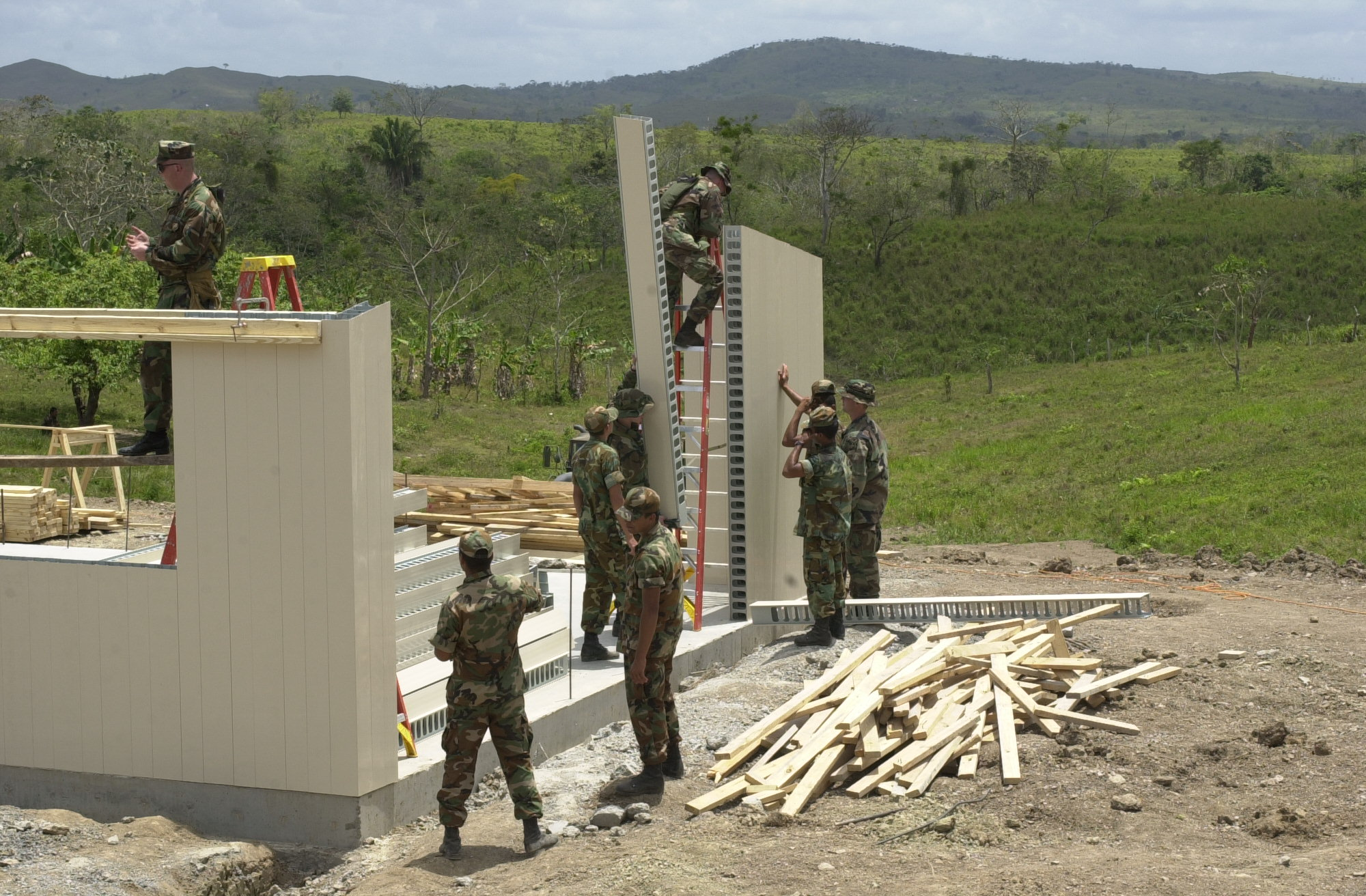
U.S. Marines & Nicaraguan soldiers build a school during Operation New Horizons

Engineers with equipment conduct civil engineering projects to execute any number of infrastructure improvement projects, such as building or improving schools, clinics, roads or drinking wells.

=== Medical civic action program (MEDCAP) ===
Medical doctors and specialists with equipment and supplies set up a temporary field clinic to provide limited medical treatment to the local population. MEDCAPs are generally narrow in scope and usually provide targeted assistance, such as inoculations.

=== Veterinarian civic action program (VETCAP) ===
Veterinarians with equipment and supplies provide limited veterinarian services for the local population. VETCAPS are generally narrow in scope and usually provide targeted assistance, such as inoculations.

=== Medical readiness training exercise (MEDRETE) ===
The U.S. military has an activity similar to civic action programs called a medical readiness training exercise (MEDRETE). Military use MEDRETEs to provide training on public health and preventive medicine.

=== Seabee teams ===
Seabee Teams also called Civic Action Teams or CATs

A product of the Cold War, Seabee Teams were an idea of the U.S. State Department for making "good use" of the Seabees. They could be sent as "U.S. Good Will Ambassadors" to third world nations as a means to combat the spread of Communism and promote "good Will", a military version of the Peace Corps. These 13 man teams would construct schools, drill wells or build clinics creating a positive image or rapport for the U.S. in the developing world. They were utilized by the United States Agency for International Development and were in S.E. Asia by the mid-1950s. Then in the early sixties the U.S.Army Special Forces were being sent into rural areas of South Vietnam to develop a self-defense force to counter the Communist threat and making use of the Seabee teams at these same places made perfect sense While Vietnam went on the teams were still being sent to other nations. The Royal Thai government requested Seabee Technical Assistance Teams in 1963 and since then nearly every time a U.S. Naval Construction Battalion has left the United States for a deployment a Seabee team has been sent somewhere.

Construction Civic Action Details or CCAD

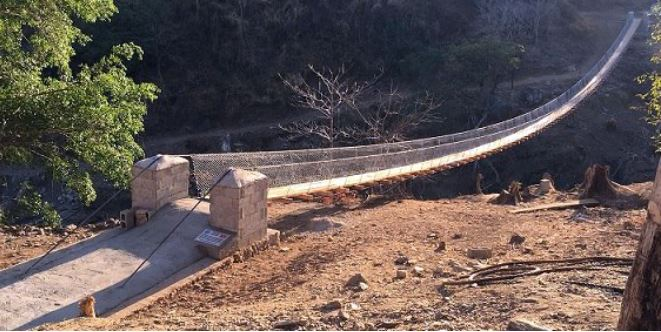
Suspension bridge built by NMCB 5 CCAD in Timor-Liste 2015(Seabee Museum)

CCADs or "See-Kads" are larger civic action units of 20–25 Seabees with the same purpose as Seabee Teams. The CCAD designation is not found in the record prior to 2013.

- Commander Naval Construction Battalion U.S. Pacific Fleet, Tân Sơn Nhất, Republic of Vietnam, Completion Report 1963–1972.
- A BRIEF HISTORY OF USOM SUPPORT TO THE OFFICE OF ACCELERATED RURAL DEVELOPMENT, Prepared by USOM Office of Field Operations, James W. Dawson, AssistantProgramOfficer, September, 1969

== Historical examples ==
=== Vietnam War ===
In the summer of 1965, United States military medical personnel conducted MEDCAPs to help the Government of Vietnam provide out-patient health services to the South Vietnamese population. The United States military also conducted a related program called Military Provincial Hospital Assistance Program (MILPHAP), where a team of medical personnel augmented civilian hospital staffs to help provide in-patient treatment. Each team consisted of three physicians, one medical administrative officer and 12 enlisted medical technicians. By 1968, the United States military fielded eight MILPHAP teams from the army, seven from the Navy and seven from the air force. By the end of 1970, 25 of 44 provinces in South Vietnam had a MILPHAP team.

=== Image Gallery ===
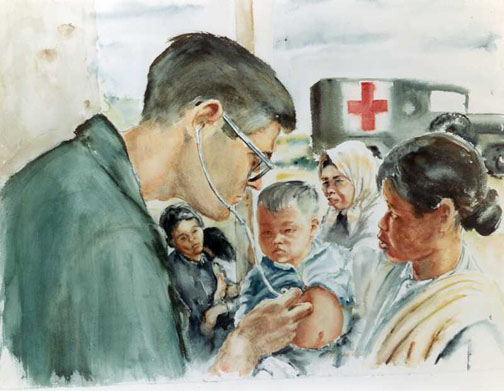
AMERICAN DOCTOR EXAMINES VIETNAMESE CHILD by Samuel E. Alexander, Vietnam Combat Artists Program CAT IV, 1967. Courtesy National Museum of the U.S. Army.

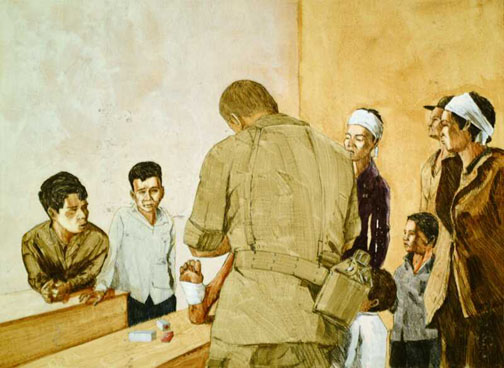
MED CAP by Dennis O. McGee, Vietnam Combat Artists Program, CAT III, 1967, Courtesy of the National Museum of the U.S. Army.

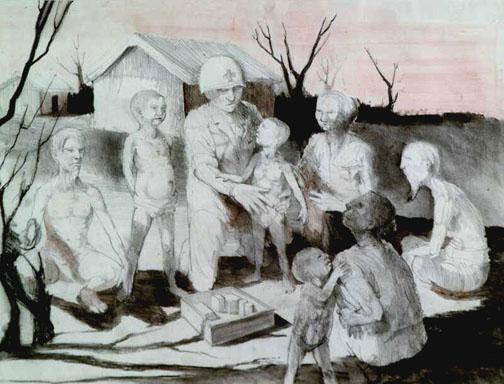
MEDCAP by Barry W. Johnston, Vietnam Combat Artists Program, CAT VII, 1968, Courtesy of the National Museum of the U.S. Army.

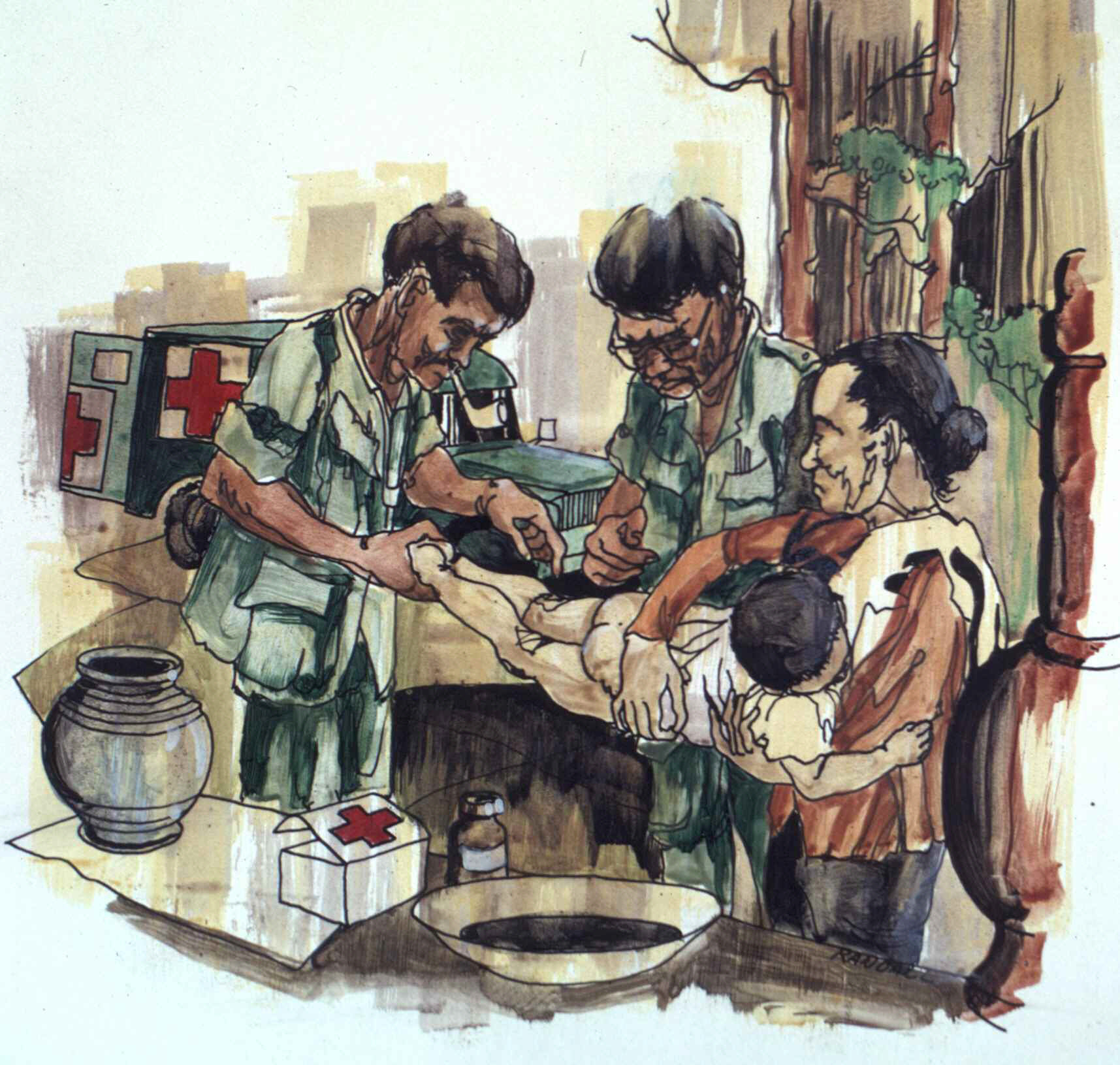
I SEE IT by Stephen H. Randall, Vietnam Combat Artists Program, CAT VII, 1968. Courtesy of the National Museum of the U.S. Army.

== See also ==
- Combined Action Program
