= Kimy Pernía Domicó =

Kimy Pernía Domicó was an indigenous leader of the Embera Katío in Colombia, best known for testifying before a Canadian parliamentary Sub-Committee on Human Rights and International Development in Ottawa in 1999 in which he criticized the Urra Dam project and its effects on the Embera Katio peoples. His criticism lead to his abduction and disappearance on 2 June 2001. His whereabouts remain unknown.

He was born on the banks of the Kuranzadó in the community of Begidó, and was registered with the name Juan Domicó but once an adult, he opted for the Embera language name, Kimy (spearhead), which his grandfather had given him and he adopted his mother's as his first surname.

He traveled to Canada in November 1999, invited by the Human Rights Commission of the Canadian Churches and there he spoke in parliament, on TV and at various events to expose the situation of the Embera Katío. Upon returning to his Reservation, he joined the Great Embera March, which left from there on 29 November 1999, and which arrived in Bogotá and remained in front of the Ministry of the Environment until 26 April 2000. He then visited the States United invited by the International River Network (IRN) and Global Exchange. In 2001, he visited Canada again to participate in the People's Summit against the Free Trade Area of the Americas FTAA.

Kimy was paid tribute in the book Blue gold: the battle against corporate theft of the world's water by Maude Barlow and Tony Clarke, first published in 2002 by Routledge.
