= Salvatore Mancuso =

Colombian paramilitary leader

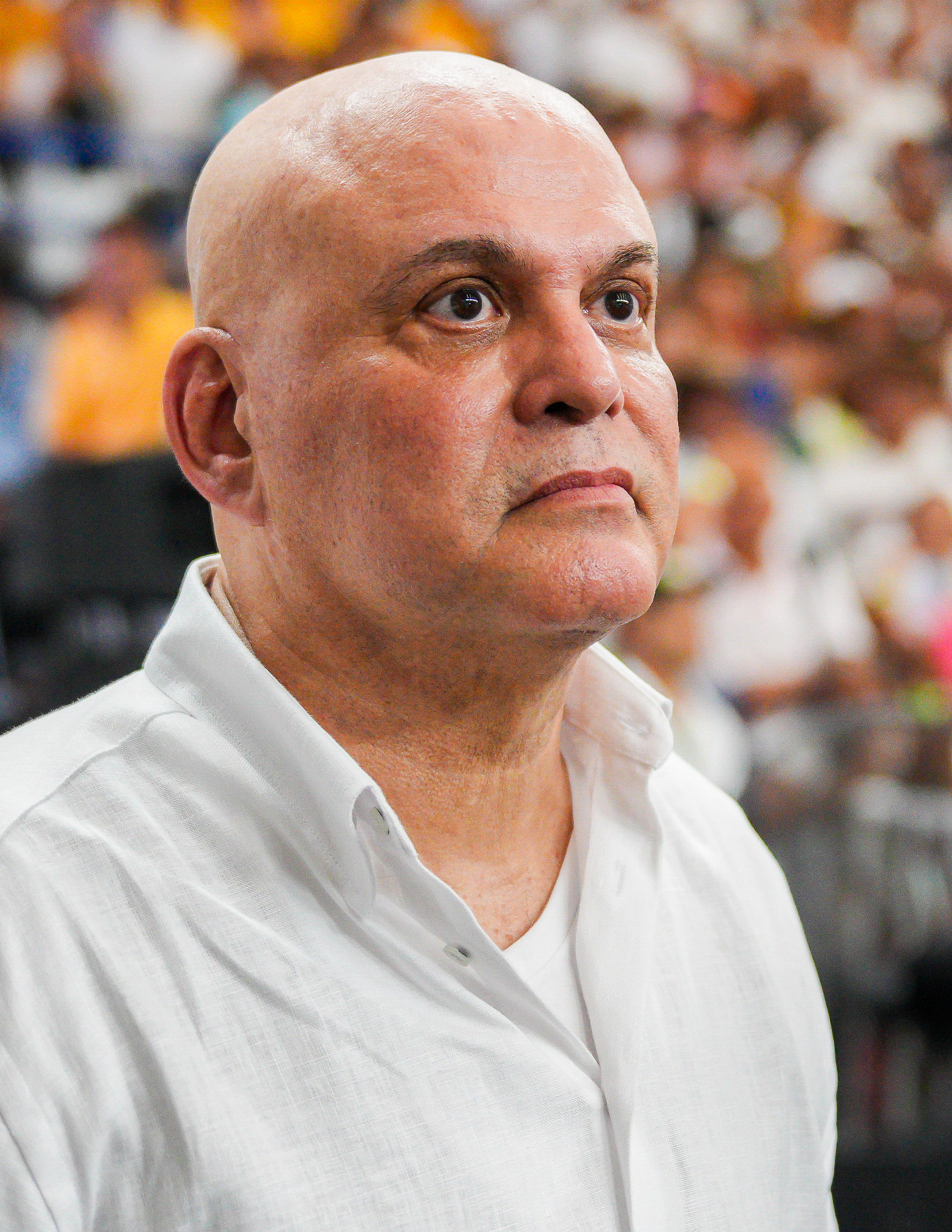
- Salvatore Mancuso in Montería in 2024
- Born: August 17, 1964 (age 62); Montería, Córdoba; Colombia
- Military career
- Allegiance: United Self-Defense Forces of Colombia (AUC); Paramilitarism; Narcotrafficking
- Rank: Bloc commander and United Self-Defense Forces of Colombia leader
- Nicknames: "El Mono Mancuso" "Santander Lozada" "Triple Cero"
- Unit: Peasant Self-Defense Forces of Córdoba and Urabá
- Conflicts: Cold War/War on drugs: Colombian conflict; Catatumbo campaign

Salvatore Mancuso Gómez, also known as "el Mono Mancuso", "Santander Lozada" or "Triple Cero" (i.e. "Triple Zero", or, "000"), among other names (born August 17, 1964) is a Colombian paramilitary leader who formerly was second-in-command of the United Self-Defense Forces of Colombia (AUC) paramilitary group. The paramilitary groups commanded by Mancuso fought the guerrillas (mainly EPL, FARC and ELN), and financed their activities by receiving donations from land owners, drug trafficking, extortions and robbery.

The AUC committed numerous atrocities and massacres against presumed guerrilla members and the civilian population. Mancuso was initially jailed in a Maximum Security Prison in Itagüí, Antioquia after a peace process that led to his demobilization and then transferred to a prison in the city of Cúcuta to help establish the whereabouts of some of the victims. In a surprise move by the Colombian government, Mancuso, along with 13 other top members of the AUC, was extradited to the United States to stand trial on charges of drug trafficking. He was convicted on those charges and served time in prison before being released and deported back to Colombia, where he was convicted of atrocities committed as leader of the AUC and sentenced to 40 years in prison.

== Early years and education ==
Mancuso was born in Montería, the provincial capital of Córdoba Department, in the northern Colombian Caribbean Region. His father was an Italian immigrant from Sapri and his mother a Montería native. He is the second of six children. He studied civil engineering at the Pontificia Universidad Javeriana, and later farming administration at the Escuela de Formación Técnica Agrícola in Bogotá. He also studied English at the University of Pittsburgh in Pennsylvania.

== Paramilitary leader ==
He became a prominent landowner in Córdoba Department and in 1995 he joined the "Autodefensas Campesinas de Córdoba y Urabá" paramilitary group, citing being tired of guerrilla extortion and abuses that the Colombian authorities failed to prosecute. The attacks by the guerrillas to the estate owners in the region brought as a consequence the formation of illegally armed self-defense groups to confront them. This new movement had the sympathy of some sectors of the Colombian Government such as politicians and some security forces, including then-current and former members of the Colombian National Army. The group was originally under the command of Carlos Castaño, with Mancuso as his main Lieutenant.

The paramilitary groups in Colombia later expanded, and in April 1997 created what was known as "Autodefensas Unidas de Colombia" (AUC), an umbrella organization under the leadership of the "Autodefensas Campesinas de Córdoba y Urabá" led by Mancuso and Castaño. Following the death of Castaño, Mancuso became the strong man, along with Castaño's brother Vicente and, consequently, the main leader in the peace process with the Colombian government of president Álvaro Uribe.

His name has been involved in the command of at least eight paramilitary groups that perpetrated several massacres such as Mapiripán. On September 24, 2002 Salvatore Mancuso and Juan Carlos Sierra Ramirez were formally charged by the Colombian and the American governments for narcotrafficking. The US Government applied for his extradition to the United States in order to be judged by an American court. Marcuso was so unconcerned about it that he attended the demobilization ceremony of the "Bloque Bananero", following the peace process with the Colombian State on November 24, 2004. The extradition application was initially accepted by government of Colombia, but soon was suspended to complete the demobilization process of the AUC. Mancuso demobilized officially and surrendered to the Colombian authorities in the demobilization ceremony of the "Bloque Catatumbo" on December 10, 2006. Gonzo author Matthew Thompson describes his 2006 meeting with Mancuso in Montería in My Colombian Death (2008).

On January 15, 2007, Mancuso admitted his crimes to a Colombian court following a deal that his attorneys were pursuing to preclude his extradition to the United States for drug trafficking. According to the country's Justice and Peace Law, Mancuso should reveal trafficking routes and drug contacts in order to completely fulfill the deal.

During his Colombian imprisonment, Mancuso had his own website and criticized the Colombian government, led by Álvaro Uribe Vélez on numerous occasions. Many politicians, members of the National Army and government officials, he claimed, had links with the AUC.

== Mafia connection ==
The 'Ndrangheta mafia clans were closely associated with the AUC paramilitary groups led by Salvatore Mancuso. According to Giuseppe Lumia of the Italian Parliamentary Antimafia Commission, 'Ndrangheta clans are actively involved in the production of cocaine. The Mancuso 'ndrina is a powerful 'Ndrangheta family but has no real proven link with Salvatore Mancuso.

== Extradition to the United States ==
In the early morning of May 13, 2008, Mancuso and thirteen other paramilitary leaders were taken from their jail cells in a surprise action by the Colombian government. According to Colombian Interior Minister Carlos Holguín they had been refusing to comply to the country's Peace and Justice law and were therefore extradited to the United States. During his first appearance before the District of Columbia Court, Mancuso refused to speak after having said his name. His lawyer pleaded not guilty for him.

The National Movement of State Crimes, a coalition of several victim organizations that have suffered from state or paramilitary violence, has asked "to return the paramilitary chiefs to the Colombian authorities so they may be processed by the ordinary justice system and not under the framework of the Law of Justice and Peace, since this framework benefits the victimizers and not the victims, since they have not told all of the truth, have not made comprehensive reparations to the victims, and have not dismantled their criminal structures."

The Office of the United Nations High Commissioner for Human Rights in Colombia stated that "[...] according to Colombian law, the reasons claimed by the President of the Republic to proceed with the previously-suspended extraditions are also grounds for their removal from the application of the ‘Law of Justice and Peace’ and for the loss of the benefits established therein".

The Inter-American Commission stated that this "affects the Colombian State's obligation to guarantee victims’ rights to truth, justice, and reparations for the crimes committed by the paramilitary groups. The extradition impedes the investigation and prosecution of such grave crimes through the avenues established by the Justice and Peace Law in Colombia and through the Colombian justice system's regular criminal procedures. It also closes the door to the possibility that victims can participate directly in the search for truth about crimes committed during the conflict, and limits access to reparations for damages that were caused. This action also interferes with efforts to determine links between agents of the State and these paramilitary leaders." A 2016 investigation by the New York Times found that the extradited paramilitaries, including Mancuso, had been given special treatment by the US justice system, serving shorter sentences than would be expected for drug-trafficking offences of that magnitude; a number of judges and prosecutors involved in trying the cases publicly stated their admiration for the political cause of the AUC, which they saw as a mitigating factor.

After his extradition to the United States, Mancuso continued to testify via satellite as part of the Justice and Peace process. On November 18, 2008, Revista Semana reported on Mancuso's declarations about the 1997 El Aro massacre, in which he stated that the AUC had received logistical help from the Colombian military and police.

Marcuso was released from prison in March 2020 after serving 12 of his 15-year sentence. The government of Colombia feared he would be deported to Italy, where he is a citizen, and escape justice for the more than 1,000 murders he committed. Mancuso's lawyers suggested he might be killed if he were sent to Colombia. Colombia and Italy do not have an extradition treaty.

He confessed to the Colombian justice system in 2023 in order to benefit from the transitional justice system and detailed the links between the State and the paramilitaries. He acknowledged the assassination of the humorist Jaime Garzón in 1998 on the orders of the Colombian army, the massacres of political opponents carried out jointly with the armed forces, his participation in the practice known as "false positives" by assassinating civilians that the military then passed off as guerrillas who had died in combat, the use of crematoria to make some of the victims disappear and mass graves in Venezuela containing hundreds of bodies that the unit he commanded made disappear. He also acknowledges that the paramilitaries helped elect Andrés Pastrana in 1998 and Álvaro Uribe in 2002.

On February 27, 2024, Mancuso was extradited to Colombia after his requests to be sent to Italy instead were denied. He was surrendered to the custody of the Colombian authorities.

In January 2026, a special tribunal found Mancuso guilty on 117 charges, including murder, forced disappearances, and displacement of peoples. Mancuso was sentenced to 40 years in prison, although the court offered to reduce his sentence if he agreed to cooperate with the transitional justice process.

== Venezuela operations ==
Mancuso testified that in the early 2000s, the AUC had met with anti-Chavez factions in Venezuela to discuss the AUC possibly operating against the Chavez government.

== Accumulated wealth ==
Immediately after his extradition Colombian police seized Mancuso's luxury ranches, farms and plots of land, with a combined property value of US$25 million.

On June 5, 2008, several Colombian media outlets reported police in Montería found a suitcase allegedly containing Mancuso's shadow administration, revealing more property owned by the warlord through secret associates.

== Popular culture ==
- In the 2013 TV series Tres Caínes, Mancuso was fictionalized as the character of Salvatore Mancini, played by the Colombian actor Agmeth Escaf.

== See also ==
- Colombian conflict
- Colombian parapolitics scandal

== Sources ==
- (in Spanish) EL TIEMPO; A cuatro generales y a la cúpula del Gobierno señaló Salvatore Mancuso en su versión libre
- Reuters: Colombia warlord says drug trade allowed to thrive
