= Ernesto Báez =

Colombian politician (1955-2019)

Iván Duque
- Born: 9 May 1955; Aguadas, Colombia
- Died: 19 November 2019 (aged 64); Medellín, Colombia
- Military career
- Allegiance: United Self-Defense Forces of Colombia (AUC); Paramilitarism; Narcotrafficking
- Rank: Bloc commander
- Nickname: Ernesto Báez
- Unit: Bolivar Central Bloc

Iván Roberto Duque Gaviria a.k.a. Ernesto Báez (May 9, 1955 – November 19, 2019) was a Colombian paramilitary leader and onetime member of the demobilized United Self-Defense Forces of Colombia (AUC). Duque-Gaviria graduated as a lawyer from the Universidad de Caldas.

== Career ==
Duque Gaviria began his career as a member of the Colombian Liberal Party. He was democratically elected as Mayor of the municipality of La Merced and later worked for the Empresas Públicas de Manizales. In 1982 founded the Asociación Campesina de Ganaderos y Agricultores del Magdalena Medio, ACDEGAM (Ranchers and Farmers of the Middle Magdalena Peasant Association) in Puerto Boyaca presumably as a facade for the creation of paramilitary groups in the troubled region. Duque Gaviria became an adviser to this organization and was later arrested in connection to paramilitary organizations accused by the Attorney General of Colombia. He was arrested and imprisoned at La Modelo Maximum Security Prison under assassination and confirmation of illegal paramilitary groups charges.

== AUC commander ==
After being released from jail Duque met with Peasant Self-Defense Forces of Córdoba and Urabá, Carlos Castaño who was at that time developing the United Self-Defense Forces of Colombia (AUC). Duque joined him and went clandestine under the alias "Ernesto Baez". Castaño and Baez decided to create a major group for the Middle Magdalena Region called "Bolivar Central Bloc (Bloque Central Bolívar, BCB) with Baez as commander. After some time of cordiality between Castaño and Baez their views towards each other deteriorated to the point of becoming enemies.

Baez disliked how Castaño became the de facto speaker of the organization, and also had differences with another paramilitary and his affinities with Castaño, known by the alias of "Doble Cero" commander of the Metro Bloc, after the killing of two members of the BCB in 2002 in an internal cleansing. This episode led to Baez' decision to work closely with Diego Murillo Bejarano (a.k.a. "Adolfo Paz" a.k.a. "Don Berna") and Castano's brother Vicente Castaño. In 2004 Vicente ordered the assassination of his own brother Carlos and "Doble Cero".

During the AUC demobilization Baez was granted immunity and political status by the government of Colombia as member of the AUC and later surrendered under the Law of Justice and Peace of Colombia. He served time in a Colombian prison for paramilitarism until 2016. On November 19, 2019 he is reported to have died of a heart attack in Medellin.
