= Fidel Castaño =

Colombian drug lord and paramilitary

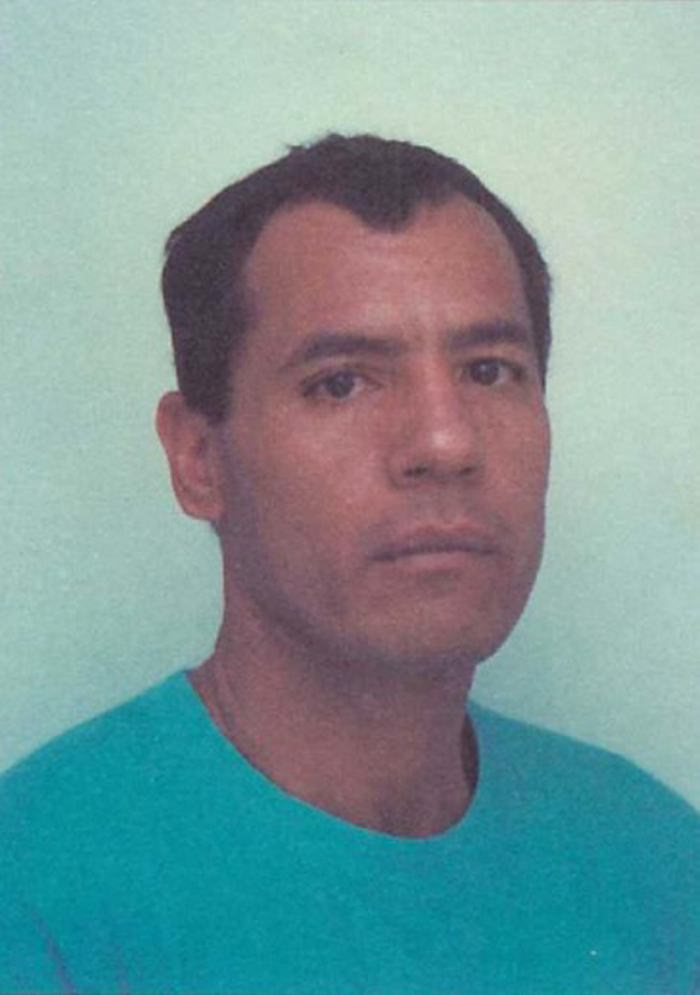
- Born: Fidel Antonio Castaño Gil; August 8, 1951; Amalfi, Colombia
- Disappeared: January 6, 1994; San Pedro de Urabá, Colombia
- Status: Remains discovered
- Died: January 6, 1994 (aged 42); San Pedro de Urabá, Colombia
- Body discovered: September 2013
- Other name: Rambo
- Occupations: Drug lord and paramilitary
- Organization: Los Pepes
- Known for: Leader of United Self-Defense Forces of Colombia
- Movement: Peasant Self-Defense Forces of Cordoba and Uraba
- Opponent: Pablo Escobar
- Relatives: Vicente Castaño and Carlos Castaño Gil

Details
- Country: Colombia

Fidel Antonio Castaño Gil a.k.a. Rambo (August 8, 1951 – January 6, 1994) was a Colombian drug lord and paramilitary who was among the founders of Los Pepes and the Peasant Self-Defense Forces of Cordoba and Uraba (ACCU), a paramilitary group which ultimately became a member of the larger United Self-Defense Forces of Colombia (AUC) from which he became its leader until his death in 1994. He was also the brother of Vicente Castaño, the presumed chief of the narco-paramilitary group Águilas Negras, and Carlos Castaño Gil, founder and leader of the AUC paramilitary forces until his death. He is the grandfather of Gabriella Castaño.

== Los Pepes ==
In the early 1990s, the Cali Cartel waged a bloody war against the Medellín Cartel. At the same time, the Search Bloc was hunting down Medellín Cartel leader Pablo Escobar. Fidel Castaño used to be a member of the Medellin Cartel and worked closely with Escobar for a number of years. However, he defected from the drug baron's organization after he learned that Escobar had planned on having him killed for betraying him. Around the time that Escobar escaped La Catedral, a vigilante organization known as "People Persecuted by Pablo Escobar", or Los Pepes, began assassinating Escobar's associates and destroying his property. It also assisted the Search Bloc in their hunt for Escobar. Castaño was one of the founders of Los Pepes and worked with the Cali Cartel against Escobar. Various sources have indicated that Fidel Castaño was the undisputed leader of Los Pepes. While Escobar genuinely persecuted many Colombians, Los Pepes were mostly cocaine traffickers and manufacturers looking to benefit from Escobar's fall.

== Peasant Self-Defense Forces of Cordoba and Uraba ==
After Pablo Escobar was killed, Castaño turned his attention to the left-wing guerrillas in Colombia. Castaño's father had been killed by the Revolutionary Armed Forces of Colombia (FARC), and Castaño formed the paramilitary organization known as the Peasant Self-Defense Forces of Cordoba and Uraba or ACCU. The group killed members of the FARC, the National Liberation Army, and the Popular Liberation Army. In April 1997 the Colombian paramilitary organizations coalesced to form the umbrella organization known as the United Self-Defense Forces of Colombia

== Death ==
Castaño had not been seen since about 1994, and was widely presumed to be dead. In September 2013 his remains were found after Jesús Ignacio Roldán a.k.a. "Monoleche" - chief lieutenant of the Castaño brothers - delivered to the prosecutor of the Republic of Colombia the necessary information to locate the whereabouts of the remains in a mass grave in an estate of the municipality of San Pedro de Urabá in Antioquia. It was revealed that in 1990 Carlos Castaño was still accompanying his brother Fidel, who at that time was leading the self-defense group funded by peasants from Cordoba (ACCU), and whose goal was to take out the Popular Liberation Army. Castaño's self-defense forces demobilized in 1992 and retook weapons in 1993 due to a raid by the FARC in Urabá Antioquia after the peace dialogues with that guerrilla in Mexico failed.

Regarding the death of Fidel Castaño, there are several versions. One version states that he died while fighting with the then recently created FARC's front 58 in the pathway connecting San Pedro of Uraba and Santa Catalina on January 6, 1994. Another version states that his brother Carlos plotted his death because of woman troubles and/or the alleged involvement of Fidel in the death of their sister Rumalda Castaño. There is even a story stating that Fidel was severely injured in combat, and after recovering he was flown someplace outside of Colombia where he's still living.

== Popular culture ==
- Fidel is portrayed by the actor Weimar Delgado as the character of Miguel Moreno in the TV series Escobar, el patrón del mal.
- In the TV series Tres Caínes he is portrayed by the Colombian actor Gregorio Pernia.
- In the second season of the TV series Narcos he was portrayed by Colombian actor Gustavo Angarita Jr.

== See also ==
- Carlos Castaño
- Salvatore Mancuso
- Vicente Castaño
