= Carlos Mario Jiménez =

Colombian drug trafficker

- Born: February 26, 1966 (age 60); Marsella, Risaralda; Colombia
- Military career
- Allegiance: United Self-Defense Forces of Colombia (AUC); Paramilitarism; Narcotrafficking
- Rank: Bloc commander
- Nicknames: "Macaco" (en:Ape); Javier Montañez
- Unit: Central Bolívar Bloc
- Conflicts: Colombian armed conflict

Carlos Mario Jiménez Naranjo, also known as "Macaco" (English: Ape; born February 26, 1966), is a Colombian former drug lord and paramilitary leader. Jimenez was a member of the United Self-Defense Forces of Colombia (AUC) paramilitary group which demobilized between 2005 and 2007. Jimenez ordered the assassination of numerous people in the region of the Santander and North Santander specially in the city of Barrancabermeja where his organization confronted and defeated the National Liberation Army (ELN) for the control of the territory. Jimenez was the commander in chief of the Central Bolívar Bloc of the AUC.

== Drug lord and paramilitary leader ==
Jimenez was first captured by Colombian authorities in January 2002 at El Dorado International Airport arriving in a flight from Venezuela. Jimenez was then wanted for homicide and concert to commit crimes. Colombian intelligence service Departamento Administrativo de Seguridad (DAS) classified Jimenez as third in command of the AUC and personal collaborator of Carlos Castaño.

After being released from prison, Jimenez sought refuge in the southern region of the Department of Bolívar, where he began to control clandestine airstrips and cocaine laboratories.

According to a report by the Colombian National Police, Jimenez also established similar cocaine complexes in Putumayo, Caqueta, Bajo Cauca Antioquia and the Catatumbo region. His main area of operation was the Colombian Coffee-Growers Axis region, where he laundered illegal drug trade money.

The Colombian National Police also pointed Jimenez as the Chief of a "Charging Office" or "officina de cobro" Colombian slang term which refers to a criminal organizations' center of operations and which was related to the Norte del Valle Cartel. By 2002 Jimenez was considered one of the replacements of drug lord Luis Hernando Gómez Bustamante aka "Rasguño".

=== Santa Fe de Ralito ===
In 2006 the Colombian government brokered a deal with the AUC paramilitary groups and negotiated a peace accord in the village of Santa Fe de Ralito, Department of Córdoba, in northern Colombia. Most of the paramilitary leaders were concentrated in the area and Jimenez became a spokesman for the organization, along with Vicente Castaño.

Two months after concentrating in Santa Fe de Ralito as a paramilitary leader, the Colombian National Police occupied his main campsites, including one known as "Villa Macaco"; a military and cocaine complex with a capacity to harbor some 250 men and had a satellite communication system. The Colombian police confiscated some 20 million Colombian pesos, weapons, 4,850 gallons of chemicals and two tons of solid chemicals for illegal drug processing were destroyed. Authorities also found an accounting book which detailed the money transactions of Jimenez.

Jimenez demobilized with the Central Bolívar Bloc of the AUC in early 2005 and was jailed under the terms of the Law of Peace and Justice which pardoned time in jail if the paramilitary groups collaborated with authorities telling the truth about their crimes and economically "repairing" the victims or their families.

The Central Bolívar Bloc of the AUC had at this time approximately six thousand men.

== Crime investigations ==
Jimenez has active processes in the United States and Colombia for money laundering, drug trafficking and support for terrorist organizations.

In Colombia Jimenez also has an accusation resolution submitted by the Attorney General of Colombia National Unit for Human Rights as responsible for the assassination in February 2001 of the regional ombudsman Iván Ramírez Luciani and four other people. Another accusation was the assassination in Cúcuta of the director of the Free University of Colombia on February 12, 2001.

The Colombian National Police also accused Jimenez of being the mastermind behind the armed assault rescue operation of hitman Jorge Iván Laverde aka "El Iguano" extracted from a Police protected clinic in the city of Cúcuta.

== Extradition to the United States ==
Colombian authorities proved that Jimenez remained active in the illegal drug trade while jailed under the terms of the Law of Peace and Justice. The government determined that Jimenez lost his benefits as paramilitary leader and decided to authorize his extradition to the United States.

A Colombian judicial instrument known as tutela was used then by the victims of the paramilitaries claiming that Jimenez had told very little the truth about their disappeared family members and conditioned the extradition if only Jimenez confessed his crimes and paid reparation.

On April 10, 2008 the "tutela" defended by the Supreme Court of Colombia temporarily upheld the extradition of Jimenez while the government of Álvaro Uribe pressed for Jimenez prompt extradition.

After Colombia's top judicial panel overturned the Supreme Court's decision on May 7, 2008, the Colombian government immediately put "Macaco" on a DEA plane to Washington.

== Prosecution ==
Jiménez first appeared before the Colombia State Court on May 7, 2008, almost immediately after being transferred from Bogotá. The Prosecution accused him of terrorism and conspiring to import cocaine into the United States. Jiménez appointed lawyers Rick Diaz from Miami and Donna Newman from New York City as his lawyers and pleaded not guilty. Macaco was refused bail, because of a "high risk of escape", despite arguments by the defense the accused could stay with relatives, currently living in the United States. The judge turned down the defendant's US$1 million bail offer.

On June 14, 2010, the Center for Justice & Accountability along with the law firm of Wilson Sonsini Goodrich & Rosati instituted a civil action in the Southern District of Florida against Macaco alleging torture, extrajudicial killing, war crimes and crimes against humanity. The case was brought under the Alien Tort Statute and the Torture Victim Protection Act.

On November 9, 2011, Macaco was sentenced to 33 years in prison for drug trafficking and narcoterrorism. Following his cooperation with US authorities, leading them to several other arrests and extraditions, the former paramilitary chief was allowed to serve only 11 of his 33-year prison sentence. On July 20, 2019, Jiménez was arrested on conspiracy and dozens of homicide charges and subsequently extradited back to Colombia. In May 2025 he stood trial in Colombia for 141 charges relating to his AUC command, including murders, forced disappearances, forced displacements, torture, and sexual and gender-based violence. After admitting guilt, Jiménez was sentenced to 20 years in prison.

== Popular culture ==
- In the second season of the TV Series El cartel, Jiménez is portrayed by the colombian actor Manuel Gómez Gutiérrez as the character of 'El Pariente'.
- In the final episodes of TV Series Tres Caínes is portrayed by Alberto Barrero.
