= Central Bolívar Bloc =

Central Bolívar Bloc (in Spanish) Bloque Central Bolívar
- Seal and logo of the Central Bolívar Bloc
- Leaders: Carlos Mario Jiménez; Iván Roberto Duque; Rodrigo Pérez Alzate
- Dates active: Officially completed demobilization in 2006.
- Ideology: Neo-fascism
- Part of: United Self-Defense Forces of Colombia
- Wars: Colombian armed conflict

The Central Bolívar Bloc (Spanish: Bloque Central Bolívar or BCB) was a Colombian paramilitary organization and a bloc of the United Self-Defense Forces of Colombia (AUC).

== Demobilization ==
The Central Bolívar Bloc demobilized in the early 2000s as a result of the agreement reached between the Colombian government and the AUC at Santa Fe de Ralito.

Demobilizations of the BCB
Date	Front	Combatants
June 30, 2005	Liberators of the South Bloc	677
September 24, 2005	Vichada Front	325
December 12, 2005	Nordeste Antioqueño Front, Bajo Cauca Front, and Middle Magdalena Front	1922
December 15, 2005	Heroes and Martyrs of Guática Front	552
January 31, 2006	Sur de Bolívar de las AUC	2523
February 15, 2006	Próceres del Caguán Front, Heroes of los Andaquíes Front, and Heroes of Florencia Front	522
March 1, 2006	Frente Sur Putumayo	504
