= Cacique Nutibara Bloc =

Colombian paramilitary bloc

The Cacique Nutivara Bloc (in Spanish, Bloque Cacique Nutibara, or BCN) was a Colombian paramilitary bloc founded by Diego Murillo Bejarano, affiliated with the United Self-Defense Forces of Colombia (AUC) paramilitary umbrella group.

The BCN officially demobilized on November 25, 2003, at which point it had 874 members.

Members of this bloc have been accused of participating in a later massacre which occurred on January 29, 2005, in the municipality of San Carlos, Antioquia, in which seven people, including two children, were killed.
