= Los Pepes =

Colombian vigilante group

- Years active: 1992–1993
- Territory: Antioquia
- Membership: 100+
- Leaders: Fidel Castaño; Carlos Castaño Gil; Diego Murillo Bejarano
- Activities: Drug trafficking; Extortion; Kidnapping; Murder
- Allies: Cali Cartel; National Police of Colombia; Search Bloc

Los Pepes, a name derived from the Spanish phrase Los Perseguidos por Pablo Escobar (English: Those Persecuted by Pablo Escobar), was a paramilitary group composed of enemies of Pablo Escobar. They waged a small-scale war against the Medellín Cartel in 1993, which ended the same year following the death of Escobar. The group was financed by the Cali Cartel and was led by the Castaño brothers. Examples of their acts could be seen on the streets of Medellín, such as hangings of Pablo's hitmen.

== History ==
=== Links to authorities ===
There are reports that Los Pepes had ties to some members of the Colombian National Police, especially the Search Bloc, with whom they exchanged information in order to execute their activities against Escobar. According to documents released to the public by the U.S. Central Intelligence Agency (CIA) in 2008, Colombian National Police director general Miguel Antonio Gómez Padilla said that he "had directed a senior CNP intelligence officer to maintain contact with Fidel Castaño, paramilitary leader of Los Pepes, for the purposes of intelligence collection."

=== Operations ===
Given that the main objective of Los Pepes was to assassinate Escobar, they acted in the same way that the Medellín Cartel acted against their enemies: killing anyone who had any allegiance with Escobar, such as their guards, accountants or lawyers, in addition to directly threatening friends and family of Pablo Escobar. They were involved in the destruction of two haciendas that belonged to Hermilda Gaviria, Escobar's mother. They were characterized by the frequent use of explosives in their attacks.

=== Aftermath ===
After Escobar was shot and killed when fighting against the Search Bloc in 1993, several of their leaders eventually went on to become leaders of a national paramilitary alliance in Colombia, the United Self-Defense Forces of Colombia (AUC), a paramilitary death squad that was formed not only for the purpose of fighting the Cartel but also the Revolutionary Armed Forces of Colombia (FARC), a Marxist guerrilla group. The Castaño brothers (Carlos, Vicente, and Fidel) were founders of several paramilitary groups and the driving force behind the AUC's creation.

Another member of Los Pepes, Diego "Don Berna" Murillo Bejarano eventually became Inspector General of the AUC, as well as an important drug trafficker with Oficina de Envigado.

The Institute for Policy Studies is searching for details of what connections the CIA and DEA had with Los Pepes. They have launched a lawsuit under the Freedom of Information Act against the CIA. That suit has resulted in the declassification of thousands of documents from the CIA as well as other U.S. agencies including the Department of State, Drug Enforcement Administration, Defense Intelligence Agency and the U.S. Coast Guard. These documents have been made public at the website Pepes Project.

== See also ==
- Diego Murillo Bejarano
- Carlos Castaño
- Fidel Castaño
- Peasant Self-Defenders of Córdoba and Urabá
- United Self-Defense Forces of Colombia
