= Carlos Castaño Gil =

Colombian paramilitary leader (1965–2004)

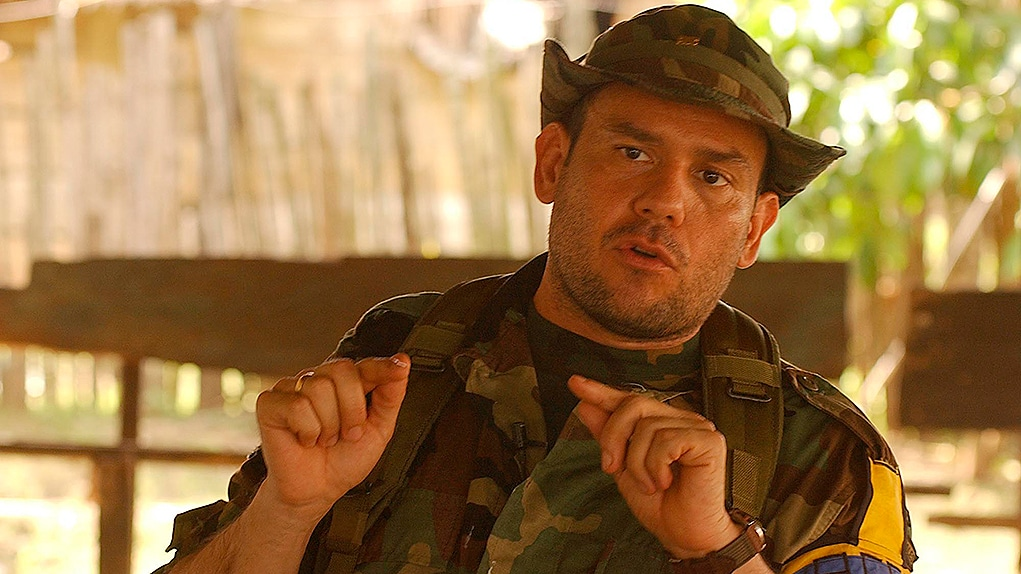
- Born: 16 May 1965; Amalfi, Colombia
- Died: 16 April 2004 (aged 38); San Pedro de Urabá, Colombia
- Spouses: Paula Restrepo (m. 1983; div. 1993) Kenia Gómez Toro (m. 1999)
- Children: Lina Castaño Restrepo; Carlos (Jr.) Castaño Restrepo; Rosa María Castaño Toro.
- Military career
- Allegiance: United Self-Defense Forces of Colombia (AUC); Medellín Cartel (until late 1992)
- Rank: Bloc commander and United Self-Defense Forces of Colombia leader
- Unit: Peasant Self-Defenders of Córdoba and Urabá
- Conflicts: Cold War/War on drugs: Colombian conflict

Carlos Castaño Gil (15 May 1965 – 16 April 2004) was a Colombian paramilitary leader who was a founder of the Peasant Self-Defenders of Córdoba and Urabá (ACCU), a paramilitary organisation in Colombia and a former member of the Medellin Cartel. Castaño and his brothers Fidel and Vicente founded the ACCU (and its previous incarnations) after their father was kidnapped and killed by the Revolutionary Armed Forces of Colombia (FARC), in association with other enemies or victims of the guerrillas. The ACCU later became one of the founding groups of the United Self-Defense Forces of Colombia (AUC).

== Early life ==
Carlos Castaño Gil was the youngest son of the family Castaño Gil, a local landowner. Like his brothers, he experienced firsthand the murder of his father by members of the FARC. At 16 years old, he was determined to take up arms against FARC In revenge of his father's murder. He became a member of a local self-defense group, which were among the first of their kind.

He was introduced to the Medellin Cartel kingpin Pablo Escobar by his brother Fidel, but he was against drugs. Castaño received combat training from his brother, from army officers and members of small self-defense groups with instruction led by Israeli mercenary Yair Klein. Of this training came out the order for the extermination against the UP between the 1985–96

The Castaño's paramilitary groups were financed by drug kingpin José Gonzalo Rodriguez Gacha. The friendship between the Castaño brothers and Pablo Escobar broke after the murders of Galeano and Moncada clan (also Castaño's partners) while being detained inside his personal prison "La Catedral". Castaño and his brothers then became founders of the group "Los Pepes" (an acronym for "people persecuted by Pablo Escobar"). During this time Carlos was known by the aliases of "the Phantom" or "the Kid". Contacts between Los Pepes and the Colombian National Police Search Bloc allegedly resulted in Escobar's death.

One month after Escobar's death, Fidel Castaño was killed in a battle against EPL guerrillas. However, it is believed that Carlos may have had a role in Fidel's death in retaliation for the alleged rape and murder (or possible suicide) of a woman alleged to have been a lover of both brothers. After Fidel's death, Carlos Castaño assumed leadership of AUC, a paramilitary federation.

== AUC leader ==
In a 1996 interview with writer Robin Kirk, later published in More Terrible Than Death: Massacres, Drugs and America's War in Colombia (PublicAffairs: New York, 2003), Castaño acknowledged that the men under his command committed "excesses", but defended them as necessary in Colombia's conflict. "Look, the guerrillas hide themselves within the civilian population, they manipulate the population". In a September 1997 interview in El Tiempo newspaper, Castaño admitted responsibility for the Mapiripán massacre.

In 1997, Castaño later founded an umbrella organization of paramilitaries operating in Colombia known as the United Self-Defense Forces of Colombia (AUC). The AUC demobilised in 2006 admitting to several brutal murders to the Colombian population. The AUC was accused by human rights organisations of committing atrocities, and it has openly admitted to its involvement in the drug trade. The AUC was listed by the US Department of State as a Foreign Terrorist Organisation. AUC was disbanded after then Colombian President Alvaro Uribe Vélez reached a peace agreement with reduced terms for its members.

Castaño was convicted in absentia of the murder of journalist Jaime Garzón, and sentenced to 38 years in prison.

In a biographical work published in 2001, he admitted to having friendly relations with the high Catholic clergy and political leaders. He added that "the Americans tolerated" the paramilitary groups and had the support of the Colombian national army.

== Accusations of narcotrafficking ==
On 24 September 2002, the United States Department of Justice unsealed an indictment against Castaño which accused him of trafficking over 17 tons of cocaine into the United States. Castaño announced that he would give himself up for trial in the United States and would accept his participation in numerous crimes, though he resented his being personally linked to the drug trade.

Castaño had become isolated from the organisation according to some observers, as he seemed to become relatively critical of the AUC's increasing association with narcotraffickers in recent years and was more willing to compromise with the Colombian Government. Allegedly this caused some AUC commanders to turn their backs on him.

Castaño stated on Colombian television in 2000 that 70 percent of AUC funds came from narcotrafficking.

== Disappearance and death ==
Castaño was killed on 16 April 2004. Acting AUC commanders claimed initially that there was an accidental exchange of gunfire between his bodyguards and a separate group of paramilitary fighters.

Other sources within the group and among its dissident factions claimed that he and his men were captured and tortured before being killed and then buried by order of other AUC top leaders (perhaps his own brother Vicente Castaño and Diego Murillo AKA "Don Berna"), who had become increasingly close to narcotraffickers and their trade. Colombian investigators found a makeshift grave and an unidentified body (yet apparently not Castaño's) near the supposed area of the events. Those same sources alleged that the bodies of Castaño and his other companions were dug up and taken to other locations before the investigators could arrive.

The possible death of the AUC co-founder remained in the air and was the subject of wild and rampant speculation. One of the rumours, dating from June 1, 2004, stated that unidentified diplomatic sources told the AFP agency that Castaño may have been spirited away to either Syria or Egypt, via Panama, allegedly with U.S. assistance. No specific reasoning or details regarding this claim were produced and the parties allegedly involved separately denied their participation.

Sources from the AUC and other local militant factions continued to dispute the exact whereabouts of Carlos Castaño. His personal and financial connections between narcotraffickers and other sectors of society could have allowed for their possible collaboration in his conspicuous disappearance or murder. Despite these claims, the truth regarding Castaño's exact condition remained unknown.

On 23 August 2006, Colombia's Attorney General publicly ordered the capture of his brother Vicente Castaño and seven other individuals, accusing them of being involved in Carlos Castaño's apparent death. Alleged witnesses to the crime stated that Castaño's body was apparently dismembered and incinerated.

Castaño's skeleton was recovered from a shallow grave on 1 September 2006, and identified through DNA testing by the Colombian government authorities. His brother's second lieutenant named Jesús Roldán AKA "MonoLeche", a former Popular Liberation Army (Ejército Popular de Liberación) guerrilla who later joined the paramilitaries, led authorities to the grave.

== Popular culture ==
- Castaño is portrayed by the actor Mauricio Mejía as the character of Adolfo Aguilar "El Halcón" in TV series El Cartel, Mejía also portrays Castaño in the second season of the Netflix original television series Narcos.
- David Noreña portrays Castaño as the character of Lucio Moreno in the TV series Escobar, el patrón del mal.
- Castaño is also portrayed by the actor Julián Román in TV series Los Tres Caínes.

== See also ==
- Paramilitarism in Colombia
- Colombian conflict
