= Saiza, Tierralta =

Saiza
- Populated center
- Location in Córdoba Department and Colombia Saiza (Colombia)
- Coordinates: 7°44′40″N 76°24′44″W
- Country: Colombia
- Department: Córdoba Department
- Municipality: Tierralta
- Elevation: 699 ft (213 m)
- Time zone: UTC-5 (Colombia Standard Time)

Saiza is a populated center of Colombia in Tierralta Municipality, Córdoba Department Department in Colombia.

== Climate ==
Saiza has a tropical rainforest climate (Af) with heavy rainfall year-round.

Climate data for Saiza
Month	Jan	Feb	Mar	Apr	May	Jun	Jul	Aug	Sep	Oct	Nov	Dec	Year
Mean daily maximum °C (°F)	31.1 (88.0)	31.2 (88.2)	31.6 (88.9)	31.6 (88.9)	30.4 (86.7)	30.6 (87.1)	30.8 (87.4)	30.7 (87.3)	30.2 (86.4)	29.9 (85.8)	30.0 (86.0)	30.4 (86.7)	30.7 (87.3)
Daily mean °C (°F)	26.1 (79.0)	26.3 (79.3)	26.7 (80.1)	26.6 (79.9)	26.0 (78.8)	26.0 (78.8)	26.1 (79.0)	26.0 (78.8)	25.0 (77.0)	25.7 (78.3)	25.9 (78.6)	25.9 (78.6)	26.0 (78.9)
Mean daily minimum °C (°F)	21.1 (70.0)	21.5 (70.7)	21.8 (71.2)	21.6 (70.9)	21.6 (70.9)	21.5 (70.7)	21.5 (70.7)	21.4 (70.5)	21.6 (70.9)	21.6 (70.9)	21.8 (71.2)	21.4 (70.5)	21.5 (70.8)
Average rainfall mm (inches)	92 (3.6)	82 (3.2)	81 (3.2)	257 (10.1)	344 (13.5)	327 (12.9)	310 (12.2)	345 (13.6)	333 (13.1)	336 (13.2)	273 (10.7)	185 (7.3)	2,965 (116.6)
Source: Climate-Data.org
