= Tres Caínes =

- Created by: Gustavo Bolívar; Yesmer Uribe
- Developed by: RTI Producciones; RCN TV
- Directed by: Mauricio Cruz; Carlos Gaviria
- Starring: Gregorio Pernía; Elkin Díaz; Julián Román
- Country of origin: Colombia
- Original language: Spanish
- No. of episodes: 80

Production
- Executive producer: Hugo León Ferrer
- Producers: Manuel Vargas; Madeleine Contreras
- Production locations: Bogotá, Colombia
- Camera setup: Multi-camera
- Running time: 42-45 minutes

Original release
- Network: RCN Televisión; Mundo FOX
- Release: March 4 – June 18, 2013

Los Tres Caínes (The 3 Cains) is a 2013 Spanish-language TV series produced by RTI Producciones for Colombia-based television network RCN TV and United States–based television network MundoFox. It is based on the story of the Colombian paramilitary leaders Carlos Castaño, Vicente Castaño and Fidel Castaño, played by Julián Román, Elkin Díaz and Gregorio Pernía, respectively, drawn from the research of their librettist, Gustavo Bolívar. It was released on March 4, 2013, and ended on June 18 of the same year. The series ran into controversy a week after its release. Several Colombian citizens (mostly victims of paramilitarism) protested the series on social networks, under the slogan #noen3caines, and denounced it as a purely commercial exploitation of violence. After this, some brands withdrew their advertising from the series.

The series has been criticized by academics, journalists, human rights defenders, victims of paramilitarism and state crimes, and citizens outraged by its lack of rigor and its dialogues that re-victimize various social sectors that were victims of this illegal armed force created by the brothers Vicente, Fidel and Carlos Castaño Gil, around whom the production revolves, similar to a controversy over alleged support for drug trafficking in the series Pablo Escobar, The Drug Lord. At the same time, the Diocese of Quibdó also criticized the series for not highlighting the role of the Church during the Bojayá Massacre.

At the same time, the series has been strongly criticized by Jesús Ignacio Roldán Pérez 'Monoleche', one of the most notorious ex-paramilitaries of the AUC, and at one time a high-ranking member. The series shows events that according to 'Monoleche' did not happen in real life, and claimed that these scenes caused him problems with his relatives and especially with his children, who were minors at the time. He particularly highlighted the scene of a young Monoleche (played by Sebastián Rendón) disturbed by the severed arm of a peasant, and swore to sue Gustavo Bolívar.

Julián Román, who played Carlos Castaño, received death threats shortly before the premiere of the series and expressed his rejection of paramilitarism and its manual for making its victims disappear.

== Cast ==
=== Castaño family ===
Actor	Character	Real character
Julián Román	Carlos Castaño	Carlos Castaño
Daniel Rengifo	Carlos Castaño (young)	Carlos Castaño (young)
Gregorio Pernía	Fidel Castaño	Fidel Castaño
Elkin Díaz	Vicente Castaño	Vicente Castaño
Luz Stella Luengas	Flor Gil de Castaño	Rosa Eva Gil Meneses de Castaño
Eileen Moreno	Romualda Castaño	Rumalda Castaño
Juliana Posso	Delfina Castaño	Adelfa Castaño
Mariana Córdoba	Margarita Castaño	Margarita Castaño
Alex Gil	Marcos Castaño	Manuel Castaño
Alex Betancour	Alberto Castaño	Alberto Castaño
Kevin Bury	Lucas Castaño	Lucas Castaño
Luis Fernando Múnera	José Alberto Castaño	Jesús Alberto Castaño González
Jesús Forero	José Alberto Castaño (young)	José Alberto Castaño (young)
Martha Osorio	Luz Marina Gil	Luz Marina Gil
Jenny Osorio	Manuela Cuadrado	María Margarita Meza
Paula Estrada	Clara de Castaño	Paula Restrepo
Michell Orozco	Laura Castaño	Lina Castaño Restrepo
Paulina Dávila	Keni	Kenia Gómez Toro

=== Self-defenses ===
Actor	Character	Real character
Francisco Bolívar	Alias "Luciano"	Jorge Iván Laverde "Iguano"
Nelson Camayo	Alias "J2"	Jhon Darío Henao Gil "H2"
Sebastián Mogollón	Alias "Monoleche"	Jesús Ignacio Roldán "Monoleche"
Sebastián Rendón	Alias "Monoleche" (joven)	Alias "Monoleche" (joven)
Santiago Prieto	Alias "Monoleche" (niño)	Alias "Monoleche" (niño)
Julio Correal	Rodrigo "Doble Cero"	Carlos Mauricio García "Doble Cero"
Margarita Reyes	Tamara López	Olga Escobar
Frank Beltrán	Alias "JJ"	Ever Veloza "HH"
Agmeth Escaf	Salvatore Mancini	Salvatore Mancuso
Hector Mejía	Alias "El Alemán"	Fredy Rendón Herrera "El Alemán"
Carlos Velásquez	Alias "Don Serna"	Diego Fernando Murillo "Don Berna"
Ricardo Vesga	Gael Galeón	Rafaél Galeano
Gastón Velandia	Nestor Páez	Ernesto Báez
Alberto Barrero	Alias "Cordero"	Carlos Mario Jiménez "Macaco"
Harold Córdoba	Ferney Peláez	Henry Pérez
Andrés Ogilvie	Alias "Copetín"	Rodolfo Ospina Baraya "Chapulín"
Ulises González	Alias "Gordolindo"	Francisco Javier Zuluaga Lindo "Gordolindo"
Josué Bernal	Alias "El Águila"	Luis Eduardo Cifuentes "El Águila"
Nacho Hijuelos	Ramón Isaza	Ramón Isaza
Hernán Cabiativa	Ariel Otero	Ariel Otero
Jorge Soto	Miguel Arroyave	Miguel Arroyave
Andrés Bolivar	Alias "Paladar"	Alias "Paladar"

=== Medellín cartel, family and hitmen ===
Actor	Character	Real character
Juan Pablo Franco	Pablo Escobar	Pablo Escobar
Julio Pachón	Gustavo Gaviria Rivero	Gustavo Gaviria Rivero
Rodolfo Silva	Gonzalo Rodríguez Mahecha	Gonzalo Rodríguez Gacha
Silvio David Plaza	Alias "El Panda"	Roberto Escobar Gaviria
Mauro Urquijo	Eduardo Rocha	Jorge Luis Ochoa
David Paez	Alias "El Pití"	Jhon Jairo Posada "El Tití"
Freddy Ordóñez	Alias "El Chupo"	Mario Alberto Castaño Molina
Carlos Manuel Vesga	Hernán Darío Henao "HH"	Hernán Darío Henao "HH"
Yesenia Valencia	Isabel Henao de Escobar	María Victoria Henao de Escobar
Wilmer Cadavid	Juan Carlos Escobar	Juan Pablo Escobar
Alison García	Mónica Escobar	Manuela Escobar
Jorge Iván Rico	Eduardo Galeón	Fernando Galeano
Jaime Correa	Mariano Moncada	Gerardo Moncada
Sebastián Boscán	Alias "Espinaco"	Jhon Jairo Velásquez "Popeye"
Dubán Prado	Alias "Tysonn"	Brances Muñoz Mosquera
Carlos Alberto Mejía	Alias "Querubín"	Alfonso León Puerta Muñoz "El angelito"
Julián Beltrán	Marcos Fender	Carlos Lehder
Morris Bravo	Alias "Toto"	Otoniel de Jesús González "Otto"
Federico Rivera	Alias "El anillo"	Carlos Mario Alzate "El Arete"

=== Government and press ===
Actor	Character	Real character
José Manuel Ospina	Jairo García	Jaime Garzón
Diego Camacho	Enrique Sander	Ernesto Samper Pizano
Fernando Corredor	Gustavo de Griffin	Gustavo de Greiff
Mario Ruiz	Germán Giraldo	Cesar Gaviria Trujillo
Diana Parra	Primera dama de Giraldo	Ana Milena Muñoz de Gaviria
Pedro Roda	Rafael Moreno	Rafael Pardo
Carlos Cifuentes	Jaime García	Jaime Giraldo Ángel
Norman Karin	Coronel Cabas	Coronel Hernando Navas Rubio
Steven Salme	Viceministro Efraín Mesa	Eduardo Mendoza de la Torre
Andrés Suárez	Antonio Arango	Andrés Pastrana
Tatiana Rentería	Primera dama de Arango	Nohra Puyana de Pastrana
Juan Carlos Messier	Alberto Otero	Fernando Botero Zea
Felipe Galofre	Gobernador de Antioquia	Álvaro Uribe Vélez
Daniel Rocha	Gobernador de Sucre	Salvador Arana
Walter Luengas	Luis Carlos Galán	Luis Carlos Galán
Juan Carlos Serrano	Rodrigo Lara Bonilla	Rodrigo Lara Bonilla
Santiago Soto	Alfredo Gómez	Álvaro Gómez Hurtado
Christian Gómez	Yair Urrego	Jairo Ortega
Herbert King	Otto Páez	Eudaldo Díaz Salgado
Myriam de Lourdes	Isabel Mariño	Gloria Cuartas
Bernardo Restrepo	Yamid Amat	Yamid Amat
Julio Sánchez Cóccaro	Orlando Troya	Horacio Serpa
Isabela Córdoba	Sofía Rumiére	Claudia Gurisatti
Rafael Henríquez	Andrés Escobar	Andrés Escobar

=== Police and army ===
Actor	Character	Real character
Alberto Palacio	General Rito Bedoya	General Rito Alejo del Río
Juan Carlos Solarte	Coronel Daniel Góngora	Coronel Danilo González
Andres Soleibe	Mayor Hugo Pallomar	Mayor Hugo Aguilar Naranjo
Hermes Camelo	General Murillo	General Murillo
Guillermo Blanco	Coronel Álvaro Arévalo	Coronel Álvaro Arévalo

=== ECAR and M-19 ===
Actor	Character	Real character
Iván Rodríguez	Miguel Miranda "Punto-Fijo"	Manuel Marulanda Vélez "Tirofijo"
Alberto Pujol	Comandante Briñez "Morrocoy"	Jorge Briceño Suárez "El Mono Jojoy"
Luis Miguel Hurtado	Alfonso Ocampo	Guillermo León Saenz "Alfonso Cano"
William Mesa	Ramiro Rey	Raul Reyes
Rashed Estefenn Rodríguez	César Navarro/Carlos Pizano	Carlos Pizarro Leongómez
Fernando Arango	Gilberto Montañéz 'Montaña'	Gilberto Montañéz 'Montaña'
Conrado Osorio	Salvador	Salvador
Alberto Cardeño	Comandante del ECAR	Comandante del ECAR

=== Cali Cartel and allies ===
! Actor	Character	Real character
Luis Enrique Roldán	Alberto Ramírez Rajuela	Gilberto Rodríguez Orejuela
Harold Fonseca	Manuel Ramírez Rajuela	Miguel Rodríguez Orejuela
Carlos Congote	Giuseppe Santamaría	José Santacruz Londoño
Mauricio Goyeneche	Hermes Valenzuela	Hélmer Herrera Buitrago
Ana Bolena Mesa	Elsa Montoya	Elizabeth Montoya
Alejandro Gutiérrez	Santiago Medina	

=== Norte del Valle Cartel y other characters ===
Actor	Character	Real character
Pedro Mogollón	Juvino	Juvino
Mauricio Cujar	Alias "Raspón"	Luis Hernando Gómez "Rasguño"
Javier Sáenz	Alias "Bisturí"	Juan Carlos Ortiz Escobar "Cuchilla"
Luis Fernando Salas	Alias "Chuleta"	Juan Carlos Ramírez Abadía "Chupeta"
Luis Eduardo Motoa	Embajador de Estados Unidos	Myles Frechette
Ricardo Mera Solarte	Alfredo Puerta	"Martín Llanos"
Alfredo Cuellar	Alias "JC"	Luis Eduardo Linares "HK"
Mauricio Figueroa	Leyton	Leyton
Ricardo Vélez	Santamaría	Juan Manuel Santos
Victor Cifuentes	Empresario	Empresario
Luis Fernando Orozco	Empresario	Empresario
Henry Montealegre	Adrián Cuadrado	Adrián Cuadrado
Brian Moreno	Aurelio Miranda	Aurelio Miranda
Saín Castro	Eliecér Jimenez	Eliecér Jimenez
Adriana Osorio	Karina's mother	Karina's mother
Andrea Ribelles	Martha	Martha
Constanza Gutiérrez	Alicia's mother	Alicia's mother
Julio del Mar	Don Asdrúbal	Don Asdrúbal
María Emilia Kamper	Karen's mother	Karen's mother
David Guerrero	Mayor of Amalfi	Mayor of Amalfi
Maruia Shelton	María Isabela, reporter	María Isabela, reporter
Adriana Silva	Laura Galeón	Mireya Galeano
Humberto Arango	Mayor of Puerto Boyacá	Mayor of Puerto Boyacá
Matilde Lemaitre	Karen	Karen
Daniel Medina	Doctor Frank Viviescas	Doctor Frank Viviescas
Barbaro Marin	Andrew Miller	Javier Peña
Beatriz Ramírez	Keni's mother	Keni's mother
Claudia Rocío Mora Hurtado	Carmen	Carmen
María Cristina Galindo	Mercedes, Carolina's mother	Mercedes, Carolina's mother
Wilderman García	Aldeano	Aldeano

=== Mistresses ===
Actor	Character	Real character
Carina Cruz	Carina Londoño	Carina Londoño
Estefanía Piñeres Duque	Carolina Jimenez	Carolina Jimenez
Carolina Coll	Susana	Susana
Emilia Ceballos	Alicia Ríos	Alicia Ríos
Juliana Daza	Alejandra	Alejandra
Juliana Caballero	Pamela	Pamela

== Broadcasters ==
Country	Alternate title/Translation	TV network(s)	Series premiere	Series finale	Weekly schedule	Timeslot
Colombia	Tres Caínes	RCN TV	March 4, 2013	June 18, 2013	Monday to Friday	21:30
United States	Tres Caínes	Mundo FOX	March 5, 2013	June 21, 2013	Monday to Friday	9pm/8c
Puerto Rico	Tres Caínes	Mundo FOX	March 5, 2013	June 21, 2013	Monday to Friday	22:00
Costa Rica	Tres Caínes	Repretel	January 6, 2014	May 2, 2014	Monday to Friday	22:00
Panama	Tres Caínes	Telemetro	January 28, 2014	Canceled	Monday to Friday	22:=0
