= El Aro Massacre =

1997 massacre in Colombia

El Aro massacre
- Location: municipality of Ituango, Antioquia; Colombia
- Date: 22 October 1997
- Target: Civilians / presumed guerrillas
- Attack type: Shooting, mass murder, massacre, crime against humanity, war rape
- Weapon: small arms
- Deaths: 15
- Perpetrator: AUC

The El Aro massacre (Spanish: Masacre del Aro) was a massacre in Colombia which occurred on October 22, 1997, in the municipality of Ituango, Department of Antioquia. 15 individuals accused of being leftist supporters of FARC were massacred by paramilitary groups. Perpetrators also raped women, burned down 43 houses, stole cattle and forcibly displaced 900 people.

In 2007, the Third Section of the Council of State ordered the Colombian state to pay damages to the victims' families.

On May 31, 2018, the Supreme Court of Justice of Colombia declared El Aro Massacre as a crime against humanity.

== Controversy ==
On April 23, 2008, Colombian President, Álvaro Uribe publicly announced that a former paramilitary fighter, Francisco Enrique Villalba Hernández, had accused him of planning the massacre, along with General Ospina, General Rosso and paramilitary leader Salvatore Mancuso, among other individuals. Uribe had been Governor of Antioquia between 1995 and 1997. According to Uribe, Villalba had said that he (Uribe) had thanked the perpetrators of the massacre for freeing 6 hostages, allegedly including one of his cousins, that Uribe's brother had provided 20 paramilitary members for the crime, and that they had met in the town of La Caucana to plan the massacre.

Uribe answered that he had never been to La Caucana and that these declarations showed inconsistencies because they mentioned the participation of a General in the supposed meeting who had died months prior to the events. Uribe also said that since 1988, Colombian authorities would know "where I've been, where I have slept and with whom I have met". The Colombian newsweekly Revista Semana reported that the paramilitary in question, Francisco Enrique Villalba Hernández, had not mentioned Uribe nor the rescue of any hostages during previous declarations made more than five years ago, when he was sentenced for his own role in the massacre. The magazine also listed a number of possible inconsistencies in his most recent testimony, including the alleged presence of General Manosalva, who had died months before the date of the meeting where the massacre was planned.

Opposition Senator Gustavo Petro had questioned Uribe about the use of a Department of Antioquia government owned helicopter that was allegedly employed to transport the paramilitaries to the region of El Aro to perpetrate the massacre. During a press conference, Uribe denied these claims saying that all the helicopters had a recorded flight history. He was also questioned about a beeper message intercepted to one of the paramilitaries involved in the massacre that said "Te recuerdo llamar al Gobernador. Preséntame y que yo lo visito en la tarde" (I remind you to call the governor. Introduce me and I will visit him in the afternoon). Uribe defended himself from these claims saying that the criminals could have used the term "governor" as slang to refer to anything and denied having met any of the perpetrators of the massacre.

Imprisoned paramilitary leader Salvatore Mancuso said that the victims of the massacre had died in combat and were not civilians but guerrillas. Mancuso was sentenced to serve 40 years in prison for the massacre.

After his extradition to the United States, Mancuso has continued to testify via satellite as part of the Justice and Peace process. On November 18, 2008, Revista Semana reported on Mancuso's declarations about the 1997 El Aro massacre, in which he stated that the AUC had received logistical help from the Colombian military and police. Mancuso said that three helicopters, one belonging to the guerrillas, another from the Colombian military and one from the Antioquia governor's office were present in the zone during the events.

== See also ==
- List of massacres in Colombia
