= Black Eagles =

Colombian crime gang

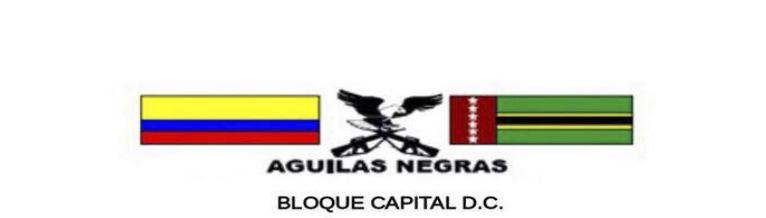
- Águilas Negras
- Leader: Vicente Castaño (disappeared)
- Dates active: 2006–2011
- Country: Colombia
- Ideology: Anti-communism; Counter-insurgency
- Political position: Right-wing to far-right
- Wars: Colombian Armed Conflict

Black Eagles (Spanish: Águilas Negras) was a term describing a series of Colombian drug trafficking, right-wing, counter-revolutionary, paramilitary organizations made up of new and preexisting paramilitary forces, that emerged from the failures of the demobilization process between 2004 and 2006, which aimed to disarm the United Self-Defense Units of Colombia (AUC).

The Black Eagles were first considered to be a third generation of paramilitary groups, but Colombian military reports suggest they were intermediaries in the drug business between the guerrilla and drug cartels outside Colombia. As of 2007, they were reported to be active in the city of Barrancabermeja. According to Fundación Paz y Reconciliación, Black Eagles ceased to exist around 2011. Since then, there is no evidence of an armed structure, camps or a military hierarchy; instead, the term Águilas Negras is used as a "franchise" by different, unrelated criminal gangs.

== Origins ==
The Black Eagles first appeared in the Norte de Santander area in 2006. On 18 October 2006, President Álvaro Uribe openly ordered their detention. The government ordered the creation of a new Search Bloc against the Black Eagles and classified them as a gang of former paramilitaries.

The Black Eagles were one of a number of groups formed following the demilitarisation of the AUC, and were said to be closely linked with the Usuga Clan drug cartel and right-wing neo-paramilitary group.

== Drugs ==
The Black Eagles were closely associated with drug cartels and were involved in drug trafficking activities, extortion, racketeering and kidnapping. They also attacked guerrilla members and suspected sympathizers. One individual accused of leading the Black Eagles was former AUC leader Vicente Castaño. Castaño later disappeared, and is believed to have been assassinated on the orders of Diego Murillo Bejarano in retaliation for taking control of his territory and criminal rackets.

== Groups ==
- Los Rastrojos: operating in Cauca and Valle del Cauca (approximately 1,200 members).
- Mano Negra: operating in Putumayo (unknown number of members).
