= Diego Murillo Bejarano =

Colombian drug trafficker

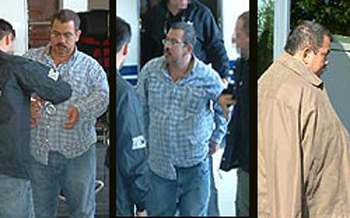
- Bejarano in 2008
- Born: February 23, 1961 (age 65); Tuluá, Valle del Cauca, Colombia
- Other names: Don Berna, Adolfo Paz
- Occupations: Leader of the United Self-Defense Forces of Colombia and The Office of Envigado
- Convictions: Drug trafficking, money laundering
- Penalty: 27 to 33 years imprisonment

Diego Fernando Murillo Bejarano (born 23 February 1961), also known as Don Berna or Adolfo Paz, is a former leader of the United Self-Defense Forces of Colombia paramilitary group, as well as the leader of The Office of Envigado cartel.

== Drug cartel activities ==
His squad was involved with the kidnapping of a drug lord who in revenge killed every squad member except Murillo, who managed to escape to the city of Itagüí. In this city he became acquainted with the Galeano family, partners of Pablo Escobar and members of the Medellín Cartel. The Galeanos controlled then what was called the Oficina de Envigado. Murillo became one of the top aides of the family, and it was as such that he received the gun injury that would give him a permanent limp. The Galeanos, however, fell out of favor with Escobar, who ordered them killed in 1992. Murillo managed to survive and then joined Los Pepes, an organization headed by the Castaño brothers, Carlos and Fidel to counter Escobar. He also managed to gain control over the illegal businesses controlled by the Galeanos in Itagüí, including the Oficina de Envigado.

Soon, Murillo had become the leader of the many criminal and hitmen gangs in Medellín, particularly the fearsome La Terraza, which was involved in theft, blackmail, extortion, assassination, kidnapping, and drug trafficking. Around the year 2000, however, members of La Terraza rebelled against Murillo and started a war against him. By then, Murillo had become well acquainted with the Castaño brothers and had also become the commander of two paramilitary blocs, the Cacique Nutibara Bloc and the Granada Heroes Bloc. He also gained control over much of the drug traffic in the area.

He became third in the chain of command of the AUC and a key player during the peace process in Santa Fe de Ralito, Córdoba between his organization and the government of Colombia, and he demobilized in November, 2003. However, in 2005 he was accused by a court of being responsible for the death of a deputy. He then escaped from Santa Fe de Ralito and surrendered to authorities four days later.

== Extradition to the United States ==
In the early morning of May 13, 2008, Murillo Bejarano and 13 other paramilitary leaders were taken from their jail cells in a surprise action by the Colombian government. According to Colombian Interior Minister Carlos Holguín, they refused to comply with the country's Peace and Justice law and were therefore extradited to the United States. Many critics argued that this action would actually be favorable to the criminal as he would only be charged for drug trafficking in the United States, as opposed to being charged for his many murders and other illegal activities in Colombia. The next day, Don Berna pleaded not guilty to money laundering and drug trafficking charges filed by United States (federal) prosecutors of the Southern District of New York State. The judge ruled the trial would begin September 16, 2008.

On June 17, 2008, he pleaded guilty to trafficking tons of cocaine. His lawyers and prosecutors agreed that he would be sentenced from 324 months to 405 months in prison. The sentence was determined on December 18, 2008. The acting director of the United States Drug Enforcement Administration said, "American and Colombian communities are safer with the removal of this notorious drug kingpin." On April 22, 2009, Don Berna was sentenced to 376 months (31 years 4 months) in prison and fined $4 million USD.

The National Movement of State Crimes, a coalition of several organizations of victims who suffered from state or paramilitary violence, has asked for the "return the paramilitary chiefs to the Colombian authorities so they may be processed by the ordinary justice system and not under the framework of the Law of Justice and Peace, since this framework benefits the victimizers and not the victims, since they have not told all of the truth, have not made comprehensive reparations to the victims, and have not dismantled their criminal structures".

The Office in Colombia of the United Nations High Commissioner for Human Rights stated: "according to Colombian law, the reasons claimed by the President of the Republic to proceed with the previously-suspended extraditions are also grounds for their removal from the application of the 'Law of Justice and Peace' and for the loss of the benefits established therein".

The Inter-American Commission stated that this "affects the Colombian State's obligation to guarantee victims’ rights to truth, justice, and reparations for the crimes committed by the paramilitary groups. The extradition impedes the investigation and prosecution of such grave crimes through the avenues established by the Justice and Peace Law in Colombia and through the Colombian justice system's regular criminal procedures. It also closes the door to the possibility that victims can participate directly in the search for truth about crimes committed during the conflict, and limits access to reparations for damages that were caused. This action also interferes with efforts to determine links between agents of the State and these paramilitary leaders."

== In popular culture ==
- His character is played by Mauricio Cujar on the Netflix show Narcos.
- In TV Series Pablo Escobar, The Drug Lord is portrayed by the Colombian actor Beto Arango as the character of Libardo Aldana Morón «Don Libardo».
- In TV Series Tres Caínes is portrayed by Carlos Velásquez as the character of 'Don Serna'.
