= Elizabeth Montoya =

Elizabeth Montoya de Sarria (born in 1949) was allegedly an emissary from the Colombian drug-trafficking Cali Cartel to the then-Colombian president, Ernesto Samper's, 1994 presidential campaign. Her husband, Jesus Amado Sarria Agredo, was convicted of drug trafficking and a former police officer was accused of having ties with the cartel. De Sarria was implicated in accusations of illegal funding of Samper's campaign after tapes of two phone calls between them and the campaign treasurer Santiago Medina were published by the Bogota magazine Semana. Jesus Sarria was later found not guilty after further investigation and absolved of all accusations.

On February 1, 1996, de Sarria was shot 12 times and killed. She was scheduled to testify against Samper, who was accused of receiving funds from drug cartels. She was later found to be a scapegoat during the famous "Proceso 8000". The group Dignity for Colombia claimed the murder.
