= La Catedral =

Prison in Medellín, Colombia

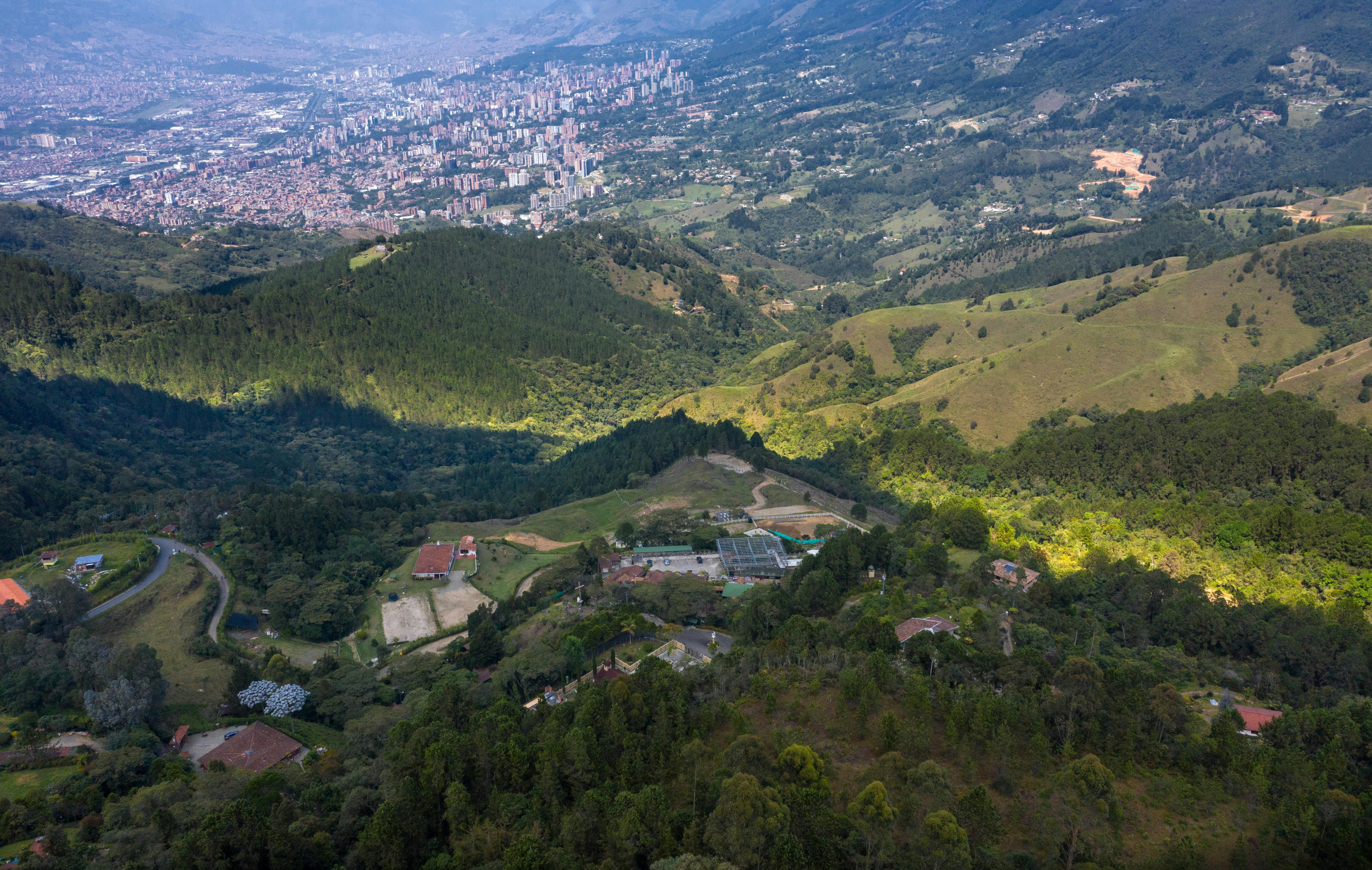
- Aerial view of the complex

- Location within Colombia
- Location: Envigado, Antioquia; 6°7′4″N 75°35′6″W
- Status: Closed
- Opened: 1991
- Closed: July 1992

Notable prisoners
- Pablo Escobar

La Catedral was a personal prison overlooking the city of Medellín, in Colombia. The prison was built to specifications ordered by Medellín Cartel leader Pablo Escobar, under a 1991 agreement with the Colombian government in which Escobar would surrender to authorities and serve a maximum term of five full years and the Colombian government would not extradite him to the United States. The prison has since been converted into a monastery by Catholic monks of the Benedictine Order.

== Construction and occupation by Escobar ==
In addition to the facility being built to Escobar's specifications, Escobar was also given the right to choose who would guard him and it was believed he chose guards loyal only to him. Moreover, the prison was believed to have been designed more to keep out Escobar's enemies and protect him from assassination attempts, than to keep Escobar inside.

The finished prison was often called "Hotel Escobar" or "Club Medellín" because of its amenities. La Catedral featured a football pitch, giant doll house, bar, jacuzzi and waterfall. Escobar also had a telescope installed that allowed him to look down onto the city of Medellín to his family's residence while talking on the phone with them.

PBS reports that although the government was willing to turn a blind eye to Escobar continuing his drug smuggling, the arrangement fell apart when it was reported Escobar had four of his lieutenants tortured and murdered within La Catedral. The Colombian government decided it had to move Escobar to a standard prison, an order Escobar refused. In July 1992, after serving one year and one month, Escobar again went on the run. With the Colombian National Army surrounding La Catedral's facility, Escobar fled through an escape route that he had built into the facility during its construction. A section of the wall had been mortared with weak concrete that could be easily kicked open, allowing Escobar to walk out. The ensuing manhunt employed a 600-man unit, specially trained by the United States Delta Force, named Search Bloc and led by Colonel Hugo Martínez.

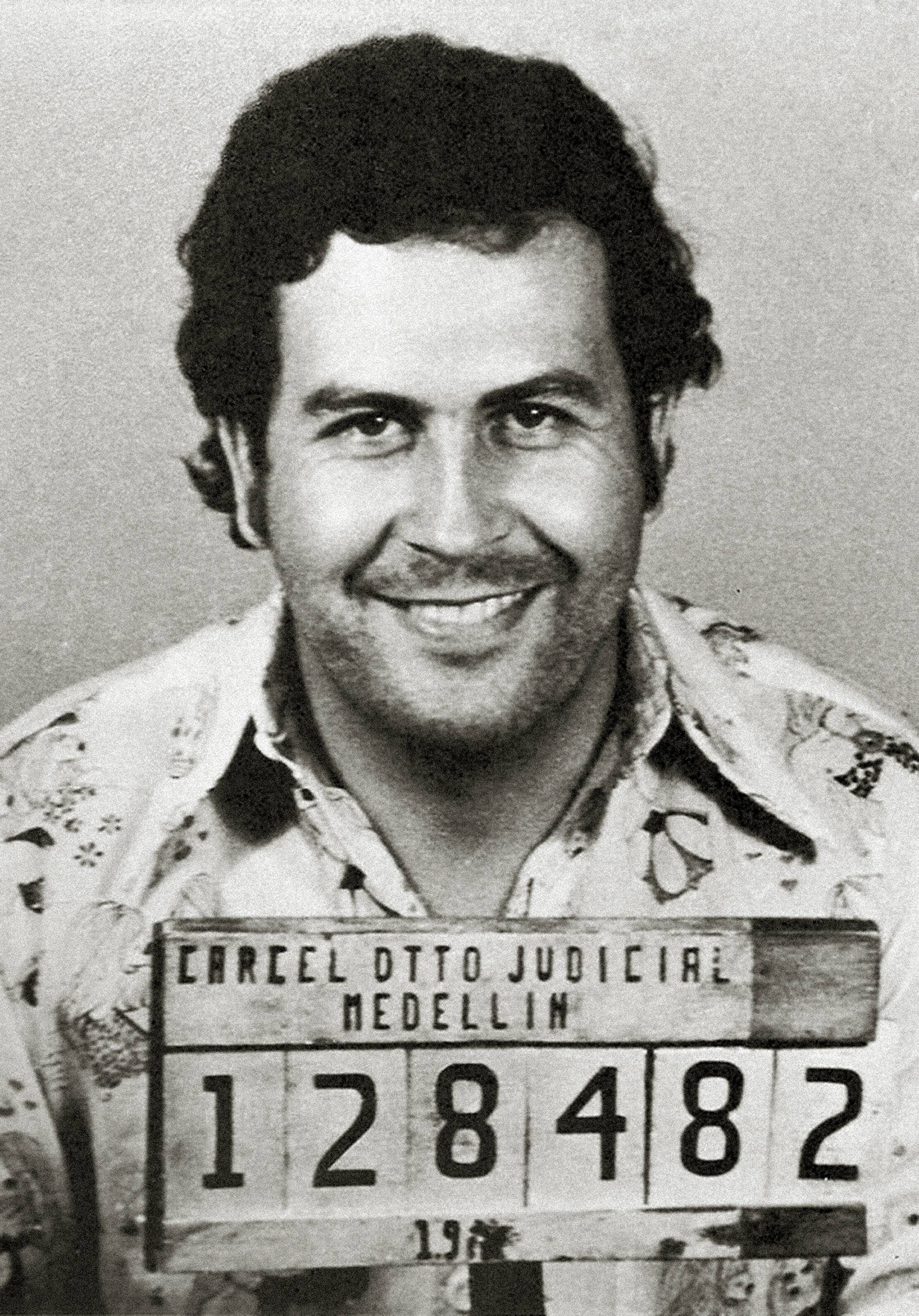
Pablo Escobar

== Location advantage ==
Fog comes over after six o'clock in the evening and returns at dawn, making air assault difficult. The location's steep topography also prevented the military or rival cartels from attacking La Catedral easily. In addition, Pablo Escobar had a large magazine stocked with arms that ensured his safety in the prison.

== Present day ==
La Catedral remained deserted for several years. In 2007, a group of Benedictine monks from the Benedictina Fraternidad Monastica Santa Gertrudis arrived at the site and transformed it. They built a chapel, a library, a cafeteria, a guest-house for religious pilgrimages, workshops and a memorial to victims of the cartel in the prison. In addition, the monks hired laid-off people to help with the daily running of La Catedral. Considering their efforts of reconstructing the prison, the city of Envigado then ceded the entire prison to these monks.

== Gallery ==
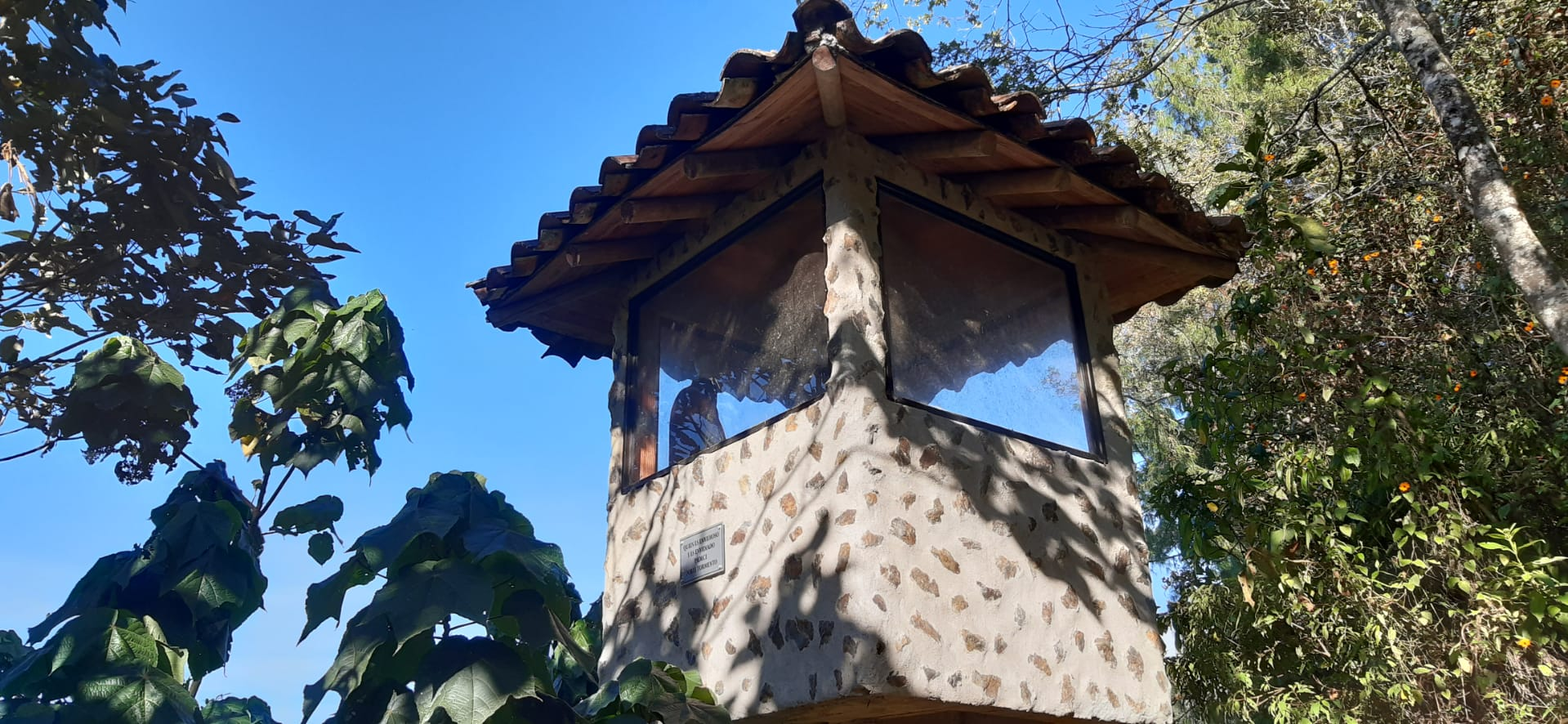
Guard house at La Catedral

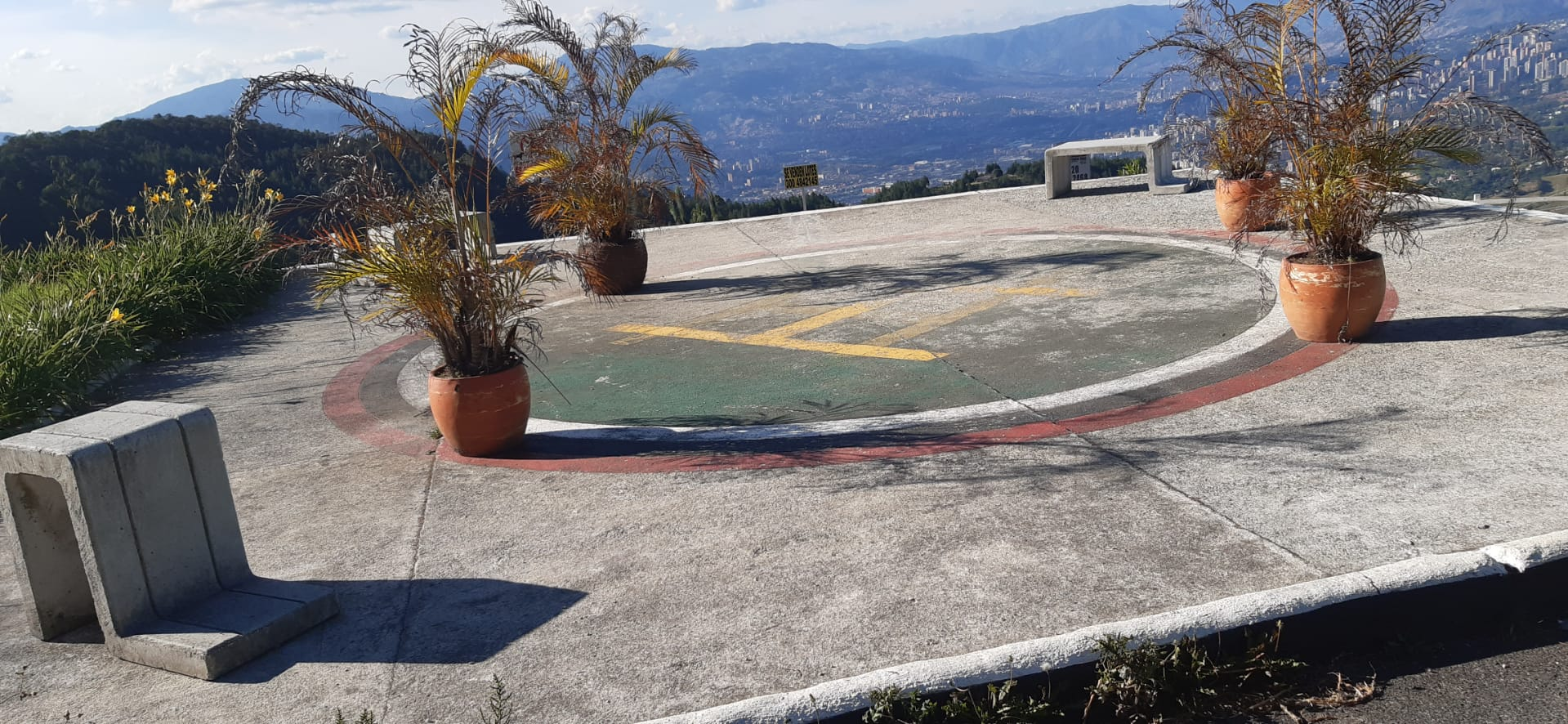
Helipad overlooking the city of Medellín

== See also ==
- Illegal drug trade in Colombia
