= United Self-Defense Forces of Colombia =

Former Colombian paramilitary

- United Self-Defense Forces of Colombia logo
- Active: April 1997 – 2006 / 2008 (nationally)
- Country: Colombia
- Type: Private army
- Size: 35,000
- Nicknames: Paras, Paracos
- Equipment: Military-grade firearms Mortars; RPGs
- Engagements: Colombian conflict

Commanders
- Notable commanders: Carlos Castaño †; Vicente Castaño; Miguel Arroyave a.k.a. Arcángel †; Diego Murillo Bejarano; Salvatore Mancuso; Rodrigo Tovar Pupo a.k.a. Jorge 40; Ernesto Báez †; Ramón Isaza; Freddy Rendón a.k.a. El Alemán; Julián Bolívar; Javier Montañez a.k.a. Macaco; Luis Eduardo Cifuentes a.k.a. El Águila; Francisco Javier Zuluaga a.k.a. Gordo Lindo; Víctor Manuel Mejía Múnera a.k.a. El Mellizo †; Pedro Oliverio Guerrero a.k.a. Cuchillo †; Miguel Ángel Mejía Múnera a.k.a. El Mellizo; Delio Eulises Agudelo a.k.a. Móvil 1

Insignia
- Identification symbol: Initials AUC
- Identification symbol: Identifying armbands, frequently black ones

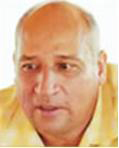
Vicente Castaño Gil

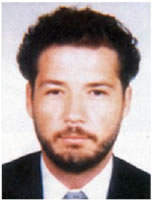
Víctor Manuel Mejía Múnera

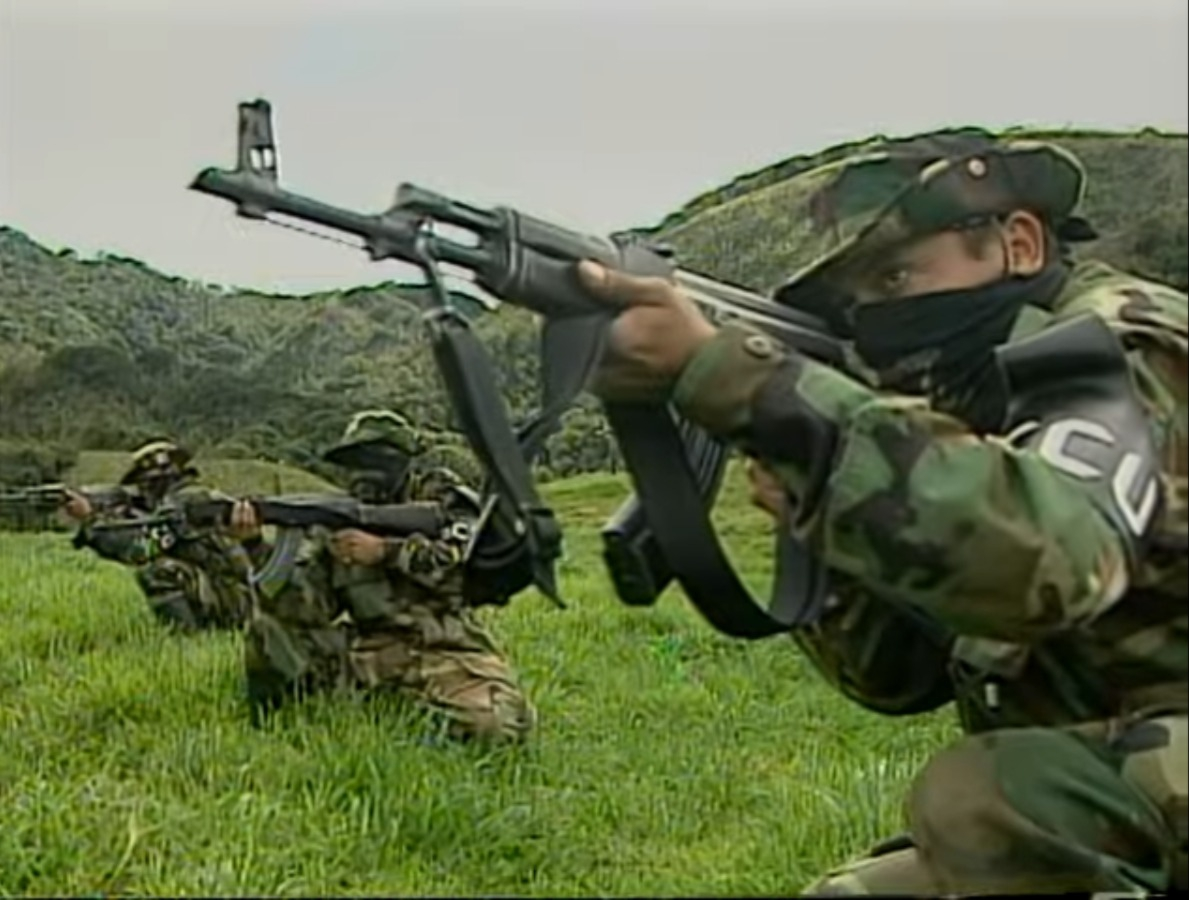
ACCU Fighters with AKM's.

The United Self-Defense Forces of Colombia (Autodefensas Unidas de Colombia, or AUC, in Spanish) was a Far Right coalition of Colombian paramilitary organizations and vigilance committees that conceived itself as countering communist terrorism, banditry, and insurgency in Colombia. The AUC was an active belligerent in the Colombian conflict from 1997 to 2006. The AUC was responsible for retaliations against the Revolutionary Armed Forces of Colombia (FARC) and National Liberation Army (ELN) communist organizations, as well as numerous deadly attacks against civilians since its formation, starting with the 1997 Mapiripán massacre.

The militia had its roots in the 1980s when militias were established by drug lords to combat rebel kidnappings and extortion by communist guerrillas. In April 1997, the AUC was formed through a merger, orchestrated by the ACCU, of localized self-defense militias, each intending to protect different local economic, social, and political interests by fighting left-wing insurgents in their areas.

The organization was believed to have links to some local military commanders in the Colombian Armed Forces. According to Human Rights Watch, the paramilitary groups and the armed forces of Colombia share a very close connection, which causes paramilitary groups, more commonly called sixth-division, to be perceived as an extension of the Colombia's armed forces, which has five official divisions.

The AUC had about 20,000 members and was heavily financed through the drug trade and through support from local landowners, cattle ranchers, politicians, mining or petroleum companies, and other companies such as Chiquita Brands International.

The Colombian military has been accused of delegating to AUC paramilitaries the task of murdering peasants and labor union leaders, amongst others suspected of supporting communist rebel movements. The AUC publicly and explicitly singled out 'political and trade union operatives of the extreme left' as legitimate targets. No definitive proof of direct links to the Colombian government has been established. The AUC was designated as a terrorist organization by many countries and organizations, including the United States, Canada, and the European Union.

The bulk of the AUC's blocs demobilized by early 2006, and its former top leadership was extradited to the U.S. in 2008. However, local successors, such as the Black Eagles, continued to exist even after official demobilization. On May 8, 2008, employees of a community radio station (Sarare FM Stereo) received a message stating: "For the wellbeing of you and your loved ones, do not meddle in subjects that do not concern the radio station. AUC, Arauca". A few days later, the letters "AUC" were daubed on the front of their office. This threat was made due to their participation in a public meeting attended by members of a Congressional Human Rights Commission on 27 September, 2007. Here, members of the public denounced human rights abuses committed in Arauca Department by different parties to the armed conflict, including the AUC.

== Activities ==
The AUC's main enemies were the leftist insurgency groups Revolutionary Armed Forces of Colombia (FARC) and the National Liberation Army (Ejército de Liberación Nacional, ELN). The AUC was designated as a terrorist organization by many countries and organizations, including the United States, Canada, and the European Union. The U.S. State Department added the AUC to the list in 2001, condemning it for massacres, torture, and other human rights abuses against civilians.

According to the Colombian National Police, in the first ten months of 2000 the AUC conducted 804 assassinations, 203 kidnappings, and 75 massacres with 507 victims. The AUC claimed the victims were mostly guerrillas or sympathizers. Combat tactics consisted of conventional and guerrilla operations against main force insurgent units. AUC clashes with military and police units gradually increased, although the group was traditionally friendly with government security forces.

A February 2005 report by the Office of the United Nations High Commissioner for Human Rights reported that, during 2004, "the AUC was responsible for 342 cases of violations of the cessation of hostilities. These include the presumed reincorporation of demobilized persons into its ranks, massacres, forced displacements, selective and systematic homicides, kidnappings, rape, disappearances, threats, intimidation and lootings. These actions took place in 11 departments and targeted the civilian population, in many cases indigenous communities."

Human Rights Watch reports allege that numerous elements within the Colombian military and police have collaborated with or continue to tolerate local AUC paramilitary groups.

Under the leadership of Salvatore Mancuso, son of Italian immigrants, the AUC maintained close links with the Calabrian 'Ndrangheta criminal organization concerning cocaine trafficking.

One of the AUC's targets was Colombian trade unions. Former AUC leader, Carlos Castaño, said: "We kill trade unionists because they interfere with people working."

=== Links to corporations ===
In March 2007, the international fruit corporation, Chiquita, admitted to having paid the AUC US$1.7 million from 1997 to 2004, ostensibly to protect its workers and operations in Urabá and Santa Marta, of which at least US$825,000 came after the AUC was designated a Foreign Terrorist Organization by the US State Department in 2001. These payments were often made through a group belonging to the Convivir network, a government-sponsored program of rural security cooperatives. The payments were arranged during a 1997 meeting between Carlos Castaño, Veloza and Delio Agudelo with officials from Banadex, a subsidiary of Chiquita.

Chiquita subsequently made a plea bargain with the United States Department of Justice, and agreed to pay a $25 million fine. Colombia's attorney general, Mario Iguarán, also opened a case on Chiquita. He stated that he will request the extradition of eight Chiquita officials connected to the case. He also charged Chiquita with using one of their ships to smuggle weapons (some 3,400 AK-47 rifles and 4 million rounds of ammunition) for the AUC. These charges were first brought ahead in a 2003 report from the Organization of American States (OAS).

Later, Attorney General Iguarán contradicted himself by claiming the extraditions could not be completed since the implicated persons had not been "identified and charged." Specifically, Iguarán asserted "there are indeed some Chiquita Brands directors, but we are not able to ask for them in extradition, rather we have to have some information contained in the agreement reached with the U.S. court that includes a confidentiality agreement." Nonetheless, information on the identities of the implicated Chiquita directors, executives, and senior employees – namely Cyrus Freid Heim Jr., Roderick M. Hills, Robert Olson, Morten Arzen, Jeffery D. Benjamin, Steven Stanbrook, Durk I. Jager, Jaime Serra, Robert F. Kistenberger, James B. Riley, Robert W. Fisher, Carl H. Linder, Keith Linder, and Steven Warshaw – have already been presented before the Attorney General's Office.

=== Israeli role ===
According to a 1989 Colombian Secret Police intelligence report, apart from training Carlos Castaño in 1983, Israeli trainers arrived in Colombia in 1987 to train him and other paramilitaries who would later make up the AUC. Fifty of the paramilitaries' "best" students were then sent on scholarships to Israel for further training, according to a Colombian police intelligence report.

== 2003–2004: Initial negotiation efforts ==
After a ceasefire was declared (which in practice was publicly admitted by the AUC and the government to be partial, resulting in a reduction but not the cessation of killings), the government of President Álvaro Uribe began talks with the group with the aim of eventually dismantling the organization and reintegrating its members into society. The stated deadline for completing the demobilization process was originally December 2005, but was later extended into February 2006. Between 2003 and February 2, 2006, about 17,000 of the AUC's 20,000 fighters surrendered their weapons. This is more than double the figure originally estimated by the government before negotiations began.

A draft law was presented to the public which offered to pardon the members of any illegal armed group (which would legally include both guerrillas and paramilitaries, i.e. members of both left- and right-wing groups) that declared a ceasefire and entered talks with the government, in return for, mainly, their verified demobilization, concentration within a specific geographic area, and the symbolic reparation of the offenses committed against the victims of their actions. After much discussion and controversy over it, a further revised draft was distributed to the media and political circles. This new project was not officially submitted for approval by Congress and further public discussion on the matter continued.

The bill, among other details, called for the creation of a three-to-five member Truth Tribunal, which would study each case brought before it (at the request of the president). The groups/individuals would sign an agreement to respect international humanitarian laws and accept the authority of the Tribunal in exchange for a minimum sentence of five to ten years (part of it could possibly be served outside jail), for those guilty of the most serious crimes, the confession of the crimes which were committed in connection with the activities of the illegal armed group and the completion of concrete acts of reparation towards the victims. If the Tribunal were to deny the benefits to anyone, there would be no possibility of reconsideration. However, the president would be able to veto individuals who did receive a favorable sentence. This new draft version of the law would have been in effect only until 31 December, 2006.

Human Rights Watch spokesman José Miguel Vivanco publicly stated, during one of the final audiences which were created to discuss aspects of the original bill (of which he remained highly critical), that the new proposition seemed to be considerably more in line with international standards, at first glance, but more needed to be done in order to fully resolve the issue.

Salvatore Mancuso, one of the AUC's main commanders, publicly expressed that he was against any potential extradition of either himself or his "comrades in arms" to the USA and refused "spending a single day in jail".

There were also internal conflicts within the AUC, as various AUC leaders mutually accused each other of being tainted with narcotrafficking, with their troops even meeting in combat. These different regional, and sometimes warring, factions within the AUC made the successful conclusion of any peace initiative a considerably difficult task.

In mid-May 2004, the talks appeared to move forward when the government agreed to grant the AUC leaders and 400 of their bodyguards a 142 square mile (368 km²) safe haven in Santa Fe de Ralito, Córdoba, where, under OAS verification, further discussions would be held, for a (renewable) trial period of 6 months. As long the AUC leaders remained in this area, they would not be subject to arrest warrants. That condition, and most of remaining legal framework invoked, was previously implemented for the much larger San Vicente del Caguán area that former president Andrés Pastrana granted the FARC guerrillas as safe haven during the 1998–2002 peace process, but there were differences:

- The local, state, and police authorities would not leave the zone, so Colombian laws were still fully applicable within its limits.
- The paramilitary leaders would require special permission to leave and re-enter the zone, and government prosecutors were allowed to operate inside it in order to investigate criminal offenses.

== Disappearance and death of Carlos Castaño ==
Paramilitary leader Carlos Mauricio García, alias "Doble Cero" ("Double Zero") or "Rodrigo", who since the 1980s had been a close associate of Castaño within the AUC, was found dead on 30 May, 2004. He had strongly objected to what he considered an improperly close relationship between the AUC and drug traffickers, and was also opposed to the group's talks with the government. "Double Zero" had fallen into disgrace in recent years, leading to the formation of his own independent "Bloque Metro" ("Metro Bloc"), which operated in the Antioquia area until it was exterminated by rival paramilitary commanders from the AUC mainstream.

Separately, in events which remain unclear, former AUC supreme leader Carlos Castaño, who had become relatively isolated from the organization, apparently suffered an attempt on his life on 16 April, 2004, presumably at the hands of either his own bodyguards, those of rival paramilitary troops, or perhaps even other entities altogether. Acting AUC commanders claimed to believe that there was an accidental exchange of gunfire between his bodyguards and a separate group of paramilitary fighters, but that he could still be alive and possibly in hiding.

Other independent sources within the group and among its dissident factions claimed that he and his men were captured and tortured, before being executed and then buried by order of other AUC top leaders (perhaps his own brother Vicente Castaño and/or Diego Fernando Murillo), who had become increasingly close to narcotraffickers and their trade. Investigators found a makeshift grave and an unidentified body (yet apparently not Castaño's) near the supposed area of the events. Those same independent sources alleged that the bodies of Castaño and his other companions were dug up and taken to other locations before the investigators could arrive.

It was speculated in the Colombian and international press that this could be a potential blow to the peace process, as Castaño seemed to become relatively critical of the increasing association with narcotraffickers in recent years and was more willing to compromise with the Colombian state; thus, the remaining AUC commanders (such as Mancuso and "Don Berna") would potentially maintain a much less open negotiating position in the ongoing talks with President Uribe's government.

The death of AUC co-founder Carlos Castaño remained unexplained for two years and was the subject of wild and rampant speculation. One of the more exotic rumours (dating to 1 June, 2004), stated that unidentified diplomatic sources told the AFP agency that Castaño had been spirited away to Israel, via Panama, with U.S. assistance. No specific reasoning or details regarding this claim were produced. The governments of the United States, Colombia, and Israel denied these allegations.

Details about Castaño's possible fate began to emerge in 2006. The Cali-based Nuevo Diario Occidente reported that an assassin hired by Vicente Castaño confessed to the police that he had killed Castaño in 2004. This assassin's confessions allowed Colombian authorities to locate Castaño's body in August 2006, and DNA tests confirmed its identity in September that year.

== Possible paramilitary activities in Venezuela ==
In early May 2004, Venezuelan authorities arrested at least 100 individuals and accused them of being Colombian paramilitaries and of scheming, together with part of the Venezuelan opposition, to carry out a series of scheduled attacks against heavily fortified military targets within Caracas, with the aim of overthrowing President Hugo Chávez.

The AUC officially denied that they had anything to do with them. President Uribe congratulated the Venezuelan president for the capture and pledged to cooperate with the investigation, while President Chávez himself declared that, as far as he was concerned, he did not believe that Uribe had anything to with the operation, for which he blamed "elements" within "the oligarchies of Miami and Bogotá", also implicating individual high-ranking U.S. and Colombian military officers, who denied such involvement.

Vice-president Francisco Santos Calderón added that he hoped the Venezuelan government would pursue with equal zeal those FARC and ELN guerrillas who would also be present in Venezuela. The Venezuelan opposition dismissed the whole event as a "setup", claiming that Chávez intended to interfere with the potential approval of a referendum which sought to remove him from power.

== Late 2004: Demobilizations ==
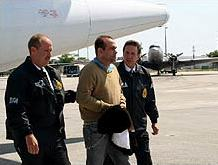
Salvatore Mancuso

In November 2004, the Supreme Court approved the extradition to the United States of top paramilitary leaders Salvatore Mancuso and Carlos Castaño, together with that of the guerrilla commander Simón Trinidad, the only one of the men to be in state custody (Castaño's extradition was approved because the court considered that the matter of his death was not yet clear).

The court ruled that the three US extradition requests, all for charges of drug trafficking and money laundering, respected current Colombian legal procedures and, therefore, they could proceed once the president gave his approval.

It was speculated in the Colombian press that the government would possibly approve the extradition of Salvatore Mancuso, but would delay it for the duration of the peace talks that he and his organization were conducting with the state. Mancuso himself declared that he would continue to participate in the process despite the Supreme Court's ruling.

In early December and late November, there were new events in the peace negotiations with the AUC. First, several hundred men of the Bloque Bananero (loosely translated, the Banana Producers' Bloc) turned in their weapons and demobilized in order to be reintegrated into civilian life. This group operated in the Uraba region of northern Antioquia, where the AUC had dislodged the FARC and gained total control in the mid- to late nineties. However, the AUC remained in the area with the presence of other divisions.

A few weeks later, the Catatumbo Bloc also demobilized. This was a milestone in Colombian history, for, with its 1,425 mercenaries, the Catatumbo Bloc was one of the most important AUC groups. With them, Salvatore Mancuso, the AUC's military leader, turned himself in. A few days later, the government announced that it would not make Mancuso's extradition effective as long as he avoided criminal activities and fulfilled his commitments to the peace process.

Both of these massive demobilizations of AUC groups were an apparent improvement over the first one in 2003, in Medellín, because on this occasion important leaders turned themselves in and the weapons presented were assault rifles, machine guns, grenade launchers, and rockets, rather than the homemade shotguns and old, malfunctioning revolvers that were turned in during the first demobilization. The AUC was supposed to have demobilized completely by 2006, but successor organizations continued to operate, such as the neo-paramilitary alliance BACRIM ("bandas criminales emergentes").

== 2005: Legal framework and controversy ==
Many Colombian and international observers were skeptical about the demobilization's prospects and saw multiple causes for criticism. A concern shared by a high number of critics, both inside and outside the country, was that the demobilization process, if it did not provide a legal framework that incorporated the proper balance of truth, reparation, and justice, could allow those who committed human rights violations to enjoy an undue degree of impunity for their crimes. A different kind of concern was held by a few of the supporters of the demobilization process, some of which believed that, without a certain degree of acceptance from the paramilitaries themselves, any unilateral attempts at reducing impunity would stay in writing without being effective in practice.

A smaller number of critics also expressed their fear that the current administration could integrate the AUC into its civilian defence militias or other military structures. Military and government spokesmen stated multiple times that there was no intention of integrating the AUC into the state's legal security apparatus. While no reports of that occurring have been put forward yet, there have been signs of some individual paramilitaries expressing an interest in wanting to aid local security efforts in areas formerly under their influence and control, in order to prevent possible guerrilla inroads.

The debate on the subject of potential impunity had a high profile in both the international and Colombian media, with critical views being expressed in Chicago Tribune and New York Times editorials, in addition to many Colombian outlets. The main argument of several editorials was that the international community should not help to fund the demobilization process until the necessary legal framework to minimize impunity was in place. This position was also echoed by representatives of the international community in a February 2005 donors' conference in Cartagena.

After many public and private discussions through mid-to-late 2004, in early 2005 a number of congressmen, including Senator Rafael Pardo and Gina Parody (traditionally holding pro-government positions) and Wilson Borja (a former left-wing labor leader, who survived a paramilitary assassination attempt in 2000), among others, independently presented a multiparty draft bill that, according to several observers such as Colombian and international NGOs (including Human Rights Watch), indicated a substantial improvement compared to the government's previous initiatives in meeting the necessary conditions of adequately dismantling paramilitarism and reducing impunity. Among those sectors, there was a semblance of a broad consensus in support of this bill.

Congressional discussion on the subject was set to begin on February 15, 2005, but suffered several delays. The Colombian government's own official draft had apparently gradually incorporated several of the provisions in the Pardo, Parody, and Borja proposal, but a number of disagreements remained, which would be the source for further debate on the subject. Other congressmen, including supporters of the government, also began to present their own draft projects.

On February 23, the top AUC leaders published an online document on their webpage which stated they would not submit to a legal framework that, in their own words, would force them to suffer through an undue humiliation that their left-wing guerrilla foes would not contemplate for themselves. They also declared that they were in favor of laws that would allow their fighters to return to civilian and productive lives in a fair, peaceful, and equitable manner. In the absence of such conditions, they claimed that the consequence would be the end of the negotiations and their preferring to face the prospect of continuing "war and death". A government communique responded that the AUC should not put pressure on Congress, the media, or the Executive on the matter of the legal framework, and that they would have five days to leave the Ralito zone if they chose to quit the talks. The AUC later reduced the tone of its earlier remarks.

On April 11, an AUC spokesman repeated their claims that the current proposal for amnesty was too harsh, primarily because it still allowed extradition for drug charges.

== Mass extradition to the U.S. ==
In the early morning of May 13, 2008, thirteen high-profile paramilitary leaders were taken from their jail cells in a surprise action by the government. According to Interior Minister Carlos Holguín, they had been refusing to comply with the country's Peace and Justice Law and were therefore extradited to the United States. Among those extradited were Salvatore Mancuso, Don Berna, Jorge 40, Cuco Vanoy, and Diego Ruiz Arroyave (cousin of assassinated paramilitary leader Miguel Arroyave). President Uribe said immediately afterwards that the United States agreed to compensate the victims of extradited paramilitary warlords with any international assets they might surrender. The U.S. State Department said the US' courts could also help the victims by sharing information on atrocities with Colombian authorities.

The National Movement of State Crimes, a coalition of several victim organizations that suffered from state or paramilitary violence, asked "to return the paramilitary chiefs to the Colombian authorities so they may be processed by the ordinary justice system and not under the framework of the Law of Justice and Peace, since this framework benefits the victimizers and not the victims, since they have not told all of the truth, have not made comprehensive reparations to the victims, and have not dismantled their criminal structures."

The Office in Colombia of the United Nations High Commissioner for Human Rights stated that "[...] according to Colombian law, the reasons claimed by the President of the Republic to proceed with the previously-suspended extraditions are also grounds for their removal from the application of the ‘Law of Justice and Peace’ and for the loss of the benefits established therein".

The Inter-American Commission on Human Rights stated that this "affects the Colombian State’s obligation to guarantee victims’ rights to truth, justice, and reparations for the crimes committed by the paramilitary groups. The extradition impedes the investigation and prosecution of such grave crimes through the avenues established by the Justice and Peace Law in Colombia and through the Colombian justice system’s regular criminal procedures. It also closes the door to the possibility that victims can participate directly in the search for truth about crimes committed during the conflict, and limits access to reparations for damages that were caused. This action also interferes with efforts to determine links between agents of the State and these paramilitary leaders."

After his extradition to the United States, paramilitary leader Salvatore Mancuso continued to testify via satellite as part of the Justice and Peace process. On November 18, 2008, Revista Semana reported on Mancuso's declarations about the 1997 El Aro massacre, in which he stated that the AUC had received logistical help from the national military and police.

Mancuso confessed to the Colombian justice system in 2023 in order to benefit from the transitional justice system and detailed the links between the State and the paramilitaries. He acknowledged the assassination of the humorist Jaime Garzón in 1998 on the orders of the Colombian army, the massacres of political opponents carried out jointly with the armed forces, his participation in the practice known as "false positives" by assassinating civilians that the military then passed off as guerrillas who had died in combat, the use of crematoria to make some of the victims disappear, and mass graves in Venezuela containing hundreds of bodies that the unit he commanded made disappear. He also acknowledged that the paramilitaries helped elect Andrés Pastrana in 1998 and Álvaro Uribe in 2002.

== In popular culture ==
- Little Voices (Pequeñas Voces) – An animated movie about the vision of children in the war in Colombia.
- IMPUNITY – THE FILM – Film about the AUC.
- La Sierra - Produced and directed by Scott Dalton and Margarita Martinez.
- Referenced in the motion picture, Miami Vice.
- Seen in the second and third season of Netflix's Narcos.
- Max Payne 3 has a mission set in Panama where the player has to fight an enemy called the AUP/United Souls of the People (Spanish: Almas Unidas del Pueblo) which are heavily based on the AUC.
- Tres Caines - Colombian telenovela about the lives of the Castaño Brothers (Carlos, Fidel and Vicente).

== See also ==
- Right-wing paramilitarism in Colombia
- Carlos Castaño Gil
- Vicente Castaño
- Salvatore Mancuso
- Rodrigo Tovar Pupo
- Colombian conflict
- Peasant Self-Defense Forces of Cordoba and Uraba
- Águilas Negras
- Los Pepes
- Guzmán Quintero Torres
- Muerte a Secuestradores
- Alfonso López Trujillo
