= Jaime Garzón =

Colombian comedian and politician (1960–1999)

- Born: 24 October 1960; Bogotá, Colombia
- Died: 13 August 1999 (aged 38); Bogotá, Colombia
- Cause of death: Gunshot wounds
- Education: Initial education in Seminarian Minor of Bogotá Universidad Nacional de Colombia (law, 1983)
- Occupations: Journalist, comedian, television producer, peace activist

Jaime Hernando Garzón Forero (24 October 1960 – 13 August 1999) was a Colombian comedian, journalist, politician, and peace activist. He was popular on Colombian television during the 1990s for his unique political satire. In addition to his work on television, he also had roles as a peace negotiator during the Colombian conflict, working for the release of FARC guerrillas' hostages.

He was murdered in 1999 by right-wing paramilitary hitmen, with suspected support from members of the Colombian military, security services and politicians, according to testimonies of former paramilitaries commanders.

In 2025, the Colombian government acknowledged its responsibility for his death in front of the Inter-American Commission on Human Rights.

== Life ==
Jaime Garzón was born in Bogotá on 24 October 1960. He studied law and political science at the Universidad Nacional de Colombia, but his active involvement in politics and television did not allow him to finish. Garzón was an avid fan of Millonarios FC, a football club based in his hometown of Bogota.

=== Mayor of Sumapaz ===
Garzón joined the political campaign of Andrés Pastrana Arango for mayor of Bogotá. After winning the elections, Pastrana nominated him as mayor of Sumapaz, an underdeveloped rural locality in the district, in 1988. Garzón tried to improve the standard of living in Sumapaz. In a year, he created a health center, the school was improved and the only street of town was paved.

But his originality was not well seen by the central administration of Pastrana. Asked in a telegram to notify the number of legal brothels in Sumapaz, he answered: "Después de una inspección visual, informo que aquí las únicas putas, son las putas FARC", a sarcastic answer typical of his sense of black humor, roughly translated as "After a visual inspection, I report that the only whores around here are the fucking FARC", a wordplay, as in Colombian Spanish the word 'putas' could mean both 'whores' as noun, and 'fucking' as an intensifier adjective. That answer and other eccentricities, brought to the conclusion by the central administration that he "had founded a brothel in Sumapaz". The municipal government secretary, Volmar Pérez Ortiz, signed his destitution. For this reason, Garzón sued Pastrana's administration; the case was ruled in his favor only in 1997.

Between 1990 and 1994 he worked at the Nariño House during the presidency of César Gaviria. He helped in the translations of the new Colombian Constitution of 1991 into the indigenous languages and as a presidential adviser in communications.

== Career ==
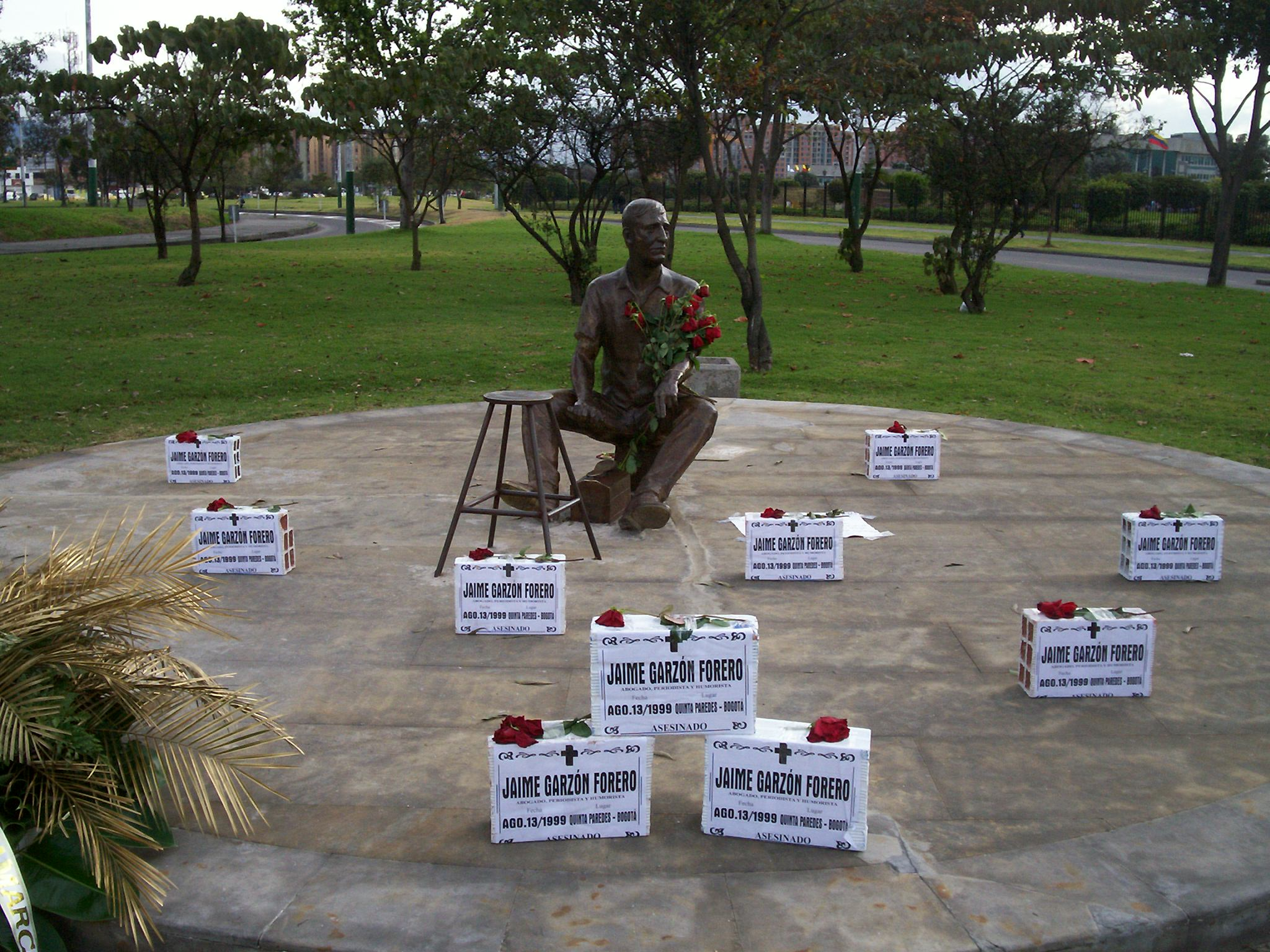
Jaime Garzon in a fictional characters "Heriberto de la Calle", monument installed in Bogotá

In 1987, the director of the Noticiero de las 7, Antonio Morales Riveira, knew of the fame of the Mayor of Sumapaz in imitating politicians. He brought Garzón to the newscast; it was the first time he would appear on television.

He worked on various television parodies, becoming famous with the TV show Zoociedad (Zoociety) in the 1990s which contained humor about materialistic society and politics. Garzón then started working on a program called "¡Quac! El Noticero", collaborating with actor Diego León Hoyos until 1997.

Garzón created many instantly recognizable fictional characters. One of them was "Heriberto de la Calle". Heriberto was a shoe shiner who interviewed different personalities, including politicians.

Year	Program	Character	Producer and channel
1990–1993	Zoociedad	Émerson de Francisco con Elvia Lucía Dávila	Producciones Cinevisión: Cadena Uno and Cadena Dos
1995–1997	¡Quac! El noticero	With Diego León Hoyos as María Leona Santodomingo: Nestor Elí, Inti de la Hoz, 'comrad' Jhon Lenin, 'reporter' Wiliam Garra, Godofredo Cínico Caspa	RTI: Cadena Uno
1997	La Lechuza	Heriberto de la Calle	Caracol Radio

=== As a peace activist ===
On 23 March 1998, 200 FARC guerrillas kidnapped 32 people on the Villavicencio – Bogotá road. Among the hostages were four US citizens and an Italian.

On 27 March a commission, with the authorization of anti-kidnapping czar José Alfredo Escobar and led by Garzón, allowed the release of nine of the hostages.

On 6 May 1998, General Jorge Enrique Mora Rangel, commander of the Colombian Army, publicly asked Escobar to investigate Garzón for his participation in the release of the hostages. On 4 June, Escobar, defended the role of Garzón in the release of the hostages as a humanitarian mission. Garzón tried to have an appointment with General Mora Rangel, but he was not accepted. The journalist sent a telegram to the military where he said: "General, do not look for enemies among the Colombians that risk their life everyday to build a proud nation as I want and as you are fighting for."

In May 1999 Garzón said in a cocktail party in front of some personalities, among them the US Ambassador, that General Mora "was accusing him of being a collaborator of the FARC".

On 25 May 1999, Senator Piedad Córdoba was kidnapped by the paramilitary group of Carlos Castaño, and she was accused by him of being a "collaborator of the guerrilla". According to Senator Córdoba, Castaño also mentioned Garzón. Once she was released, she met the journalist and warned him of the danger.

The participation in the process of the FARC's hostage releases and the intention to promote a dialogue of peace brought him many threats, but the most noticeable were those from Castaño.

== Murder ==
On 10 August 1999, Garzón visited the paramilitary leader Ángel Gaitán Mahecha, who was in the Modelo Prison in Bogotá with the intention to arrange a meeting with Carlos Castaño. The meeting was to be held on 14 August in the Córdoba Department.

On 11 August, Garzón said to his wife and a makeup artist that he was going to be killed the next day.

On 13 August, at 5:45, local time, Garzón was approaching the Radionet station in Bogotá in his gray Jeep Cherokee. When he was turning toward the south coming from 26th Street in the Barrio Quinta Paredes sector, in front of Corferias, two men riding a high velocity white motorcycle with hidden plates approached the car and called his name, then shot him five times. He was 38 years old.

The word quickly spread as his own colleagues at Radionet were the first to give the news to Colombia. Hundreds of people went out into the streets. The vehicular traffic worsened when a pedestrian bridge fell onto the North Highway, near 122nd Street, because a group of people thought wrongly that the funeral would pass by the site. Three people died and 30 were injured.

On the night of Garzón's death, sports presenter César Augusto Londoño for Noticiero CM& had to introduce a memorial note to Heriberto de la Calle, one of the characters of his murdered companion. He introduced the note saying: "that's all for sports ... Shitty country!".

On 5 February 2021, the court confirmed the 26-year sentence against former ADS deputy director José Miguel Narváez for the murder of Garzón after more than 21 years of the crime.

In 2025, the Colombian government acknowledged its responsibility for his death "by action and omission" in front of the Inter-American Commission on Human Rights.

== Investigation ==
According to Judge Julio Roberto Ballén Silva, the AUC reacted against his involvement in negotiations for the release of guerrilla-held hostages on behalf of their family members. There are several versions of what happened in the days preceding his murder. In one of them Garzón was informed of an order to assassinate him; he then contacted Castaño, who scheduled a meeting with him to take place just the day after his murder and sent a counter order to abort the assassination. The order apparently either never reached the actual killers, or came after it was too late. This led some to speculate that the meeting was a trap.

An investigation conducted by the TV program Contravía directed by Holman Morris provides evidence of the participation of agents of the Departamento Administrativo de Seguridad (DAS, the then state intelligence agency) in employing false witnesses to cause the investigation turn away from the real events. Likewise, the paramilitary leader Freddy Rendón Herrera aka "El Alemán" accused members of the military forces of being intellectual authors of the murder.

=== Accusations against Castaño ===
On 13 September 1999, the authorities reacted promptly to guarantee the arrest of the assassins of the journalist. Four people participated in the first investigations as key witnesses of the crime: María Amparo Arroyave Mantilla, Wilson Llano Caballero alias El Profe, Maribel Pérez Jiménez and Wilson Raúl Ramirez Muñoz.

Although the time of the crime was too early and María Amparo Arroyave was on the 4th floor of a building (located 100 meters from the place of the assassination) and the two hitmen were wearing helmets, she was able to give a detailed description of one of the assassins' face and clothing.

On 19 August 1999, as an answer to the suggestion of a journalist, who had said that the responsibility for the crime of Garzón fell on the military superiors, the Minister of Defense, Luis Fernando Ramírez, along with several commanders of the National Army, made a public declaration. In it, they announced that such suggestion was defamatory and that they rejected and condemned the crime of "one of the best journalists of the end of the century, the best humorist and the sharpest critic of the Colombian society of the last decades."

On 6 January 2000, the Police of Medellín arrested Juan Pablo Ortiz Agudelo, alias Bochas, who, according to the Administrative Department of Security, was the assassin that shot Garzón and was recognized by María Amparo Arroyave.

On 24 April Carlos Castaño, top leader of the AUC, was formally accused of being the mastermind of the crime. On 6 June he was declared absent defendant.

On 24 September 2001, the Police arrested Edilberto Antonio Sierra Ayala in Belén de Umbría under the accusation of being the other criminal who had driven the motorbike.

On 3 January 2002, the tribunal made the closure of the process official. Therefore, a request of the civil part to review the case was ignored by the tribunal.

=== Complaints of manipulation of the investigation ===
On 21 January 2000, the Attorney General was the first entity to cast doubt on the veracity of María Amparo Arroyave's testimony. The Attorney then ordered a careful inspection of the place from which she claimed that she saw the crime. According to lawyer Alirio Uribe Muñoz, the Attorney concluded that observing the details of the assassins from the place she claimed that she saw the crime was impossible. Furthermore, the Attorney found several contradictions in her description and a few coincidences with other witnesses's, who happened to be nearer to the place of the crime; none of them could remember the assassins' faces, because they were very fast. Nevertheless, none of these inconsistencies had been reviewed in the record. Arroyave Montoya then disappeared and then was contacted by the DAS agent Juan Ángel Ramírez García, whom Attorney General Office did not allow his investigation.

In October 2002, Reporters Without Borders and Red Damocles also questioned the veracity of Wilson Llano Caballero's testimony, who also was considered to be a "key witness" during the first investigation and was presented as a "DAS Informant": He provided pictures and information about the alleged murderers, alias "Bochas" and "Toño", and convinced his girlfriend, Maribel Pérez Jiménez, and his neighbour, Wilson Raúl Ramírez, to declare against the two suspects.

=== Confessions of paramilitary leaders ===
On 11 March 2004, Judge Julio Roberto Ballén Silva then acquitted the two alleged assassins of the journalist. The sentence allowed opening an investigation into the agents, officials and false witnesses of the first process. The tribunal concluded once more that Carlos Castaño was the mastermind of the crime, therefore Castaño was sentenced to 38 years in prison and fined 790 million pesos. However, in April of that very year, Castaño was killed probably by disputes among the same paramilitary members.

On 9 May 2008, the former Paramilitary leader Diego Fernando Murillo alias Don Berna, said that members of the criminal gang La Terraza of Medellín, that served Carlos Castaño, were the assassins of Garzón.

In June 2008, paramilitary leader Jorge Iván Laverde, alias El Iguano, declared before Law of Justice and Peace that the former sub-director of the DAS, José Miguel Narváez, instigated Carlos Castaño to kill Jaime Garzón. A month later, in July, another paramilitary former member, Ever Veloza García alias HH, gave a USB drive that belonged to Carlos Castaño to the Attorney General and said that the USB contained evidence that Castaño ordered La Terraza gang to assassinate Jaime Garzón. Furthermore, Veloza said that Castaño had said, at several occasions, that the crime of Garzón "was a mistake" and that "it was carried out to do some friends of the National Army a favor".

In October 2009 former paramilitary leader Freddy Rendón Herrera, alias "El Alemán", told the Justice and Peace process that Carlos Castaño had ordered the assassination of the journalist under "specific request of senior military leaders of the time".

== In popular culture ==
- Garzón is portrayed by Colombian actor Jose Manuel Ospina as the character of 'Jairo García' in TV Series Tres Caínes.
