= Santa Fe de Ralito =

- Populated center
- Location in Córdoba Department and Colombia Santa Fe de Ralito (Colombia)
- Country: Colombia
- Department: Córdoba Department
- Municipality: Tierralta
- Elevation: 699 ft (213 m)
- Time zone: UTC-5 (Colombia Standard Time)

Santa Fe de Ralito is a populated center of Colombia in Córdoba Department, Colombia. It was also the home base for the former leader of the AUC, Salvatore Mancuso, as well as other leaders and 400 of their bodyguards. As part of the late 2004 demobilizations, these people were given a temporary 142 square mile (368 km^{2}) haven in Santa Fe de Ralito. While the AUC leaders remained in this area, they were not subject to arrest warrants. Colombian authorities and security forces could enter and leave Santa Fe de Ralito at will, but paramilitary leaders required government authorization to do so. This haven ceased to exist as such between late 2005 and early 2006, as the demobilizations came to an end.
