= Agmeth Escaf =

Colombian politician and actor

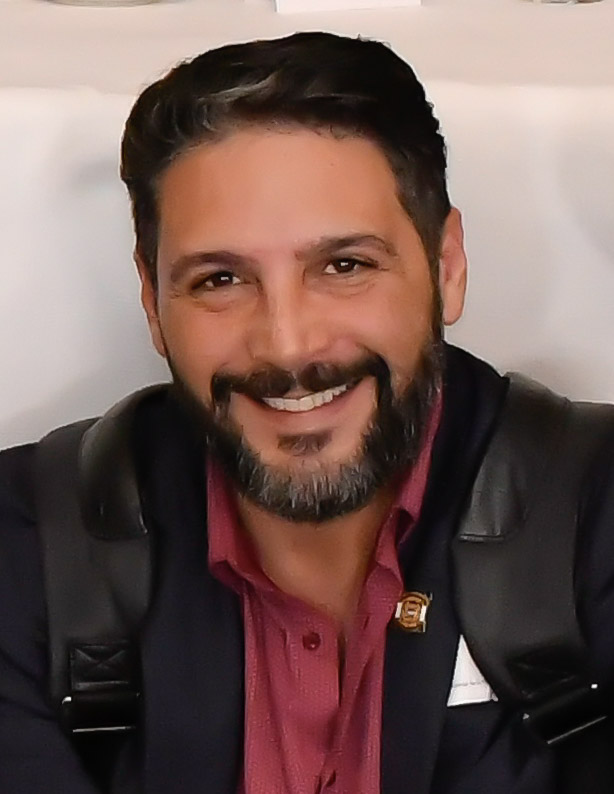
- Escaf in September 2023

Member of the Chamber of Representatives
- Incumbent
- Assumed office 20 July 2022
- Constituency: Atlántico

Personal details
- Born: Agmeth José Escaf Tijerino; 23 April 1973 (age 53) Barranquilla, Colombia
- Party: Humane Colombia
- Other political affiliations: Historic Pact for Colombia

Agmeth José Escaf Tijerino (born 23 April 1973) is a Colombian politician, actor, and TV presenter and director. He currently serves as a deputy in the Chamber of Representatives, representing Atlántico for the coalition Historic Pact for Colombia.

== Career ==
Escaf was born in Barranquilla to a Lebanese father and a Colombian mother of Italian descent. He left Barranquilla in 1995 and settled in Bogotá. In that same year, Escaf made his first appearance on TV and spent most of his acting career working for Caracol Televisión. In 2012, however, he left the network in bad terms, accusing Caracol Televisión of exploiting him and cutting basic benefits. Escaf subsequently took legal action against the network, winning a millionaire lawsuit in damages.

Escaf won a seat in the Chamber of Representatives representing Atlántico Department for the leftist Historic Pact for Colombia party. He took office in July 2022, mainly supporting president Gustavo Petro's policies on health and workers rights.

== Personal life ==
Escaf has described his relationship with his father as nonexistent, and has not talked to him since moving to Bogotá in 1995. On Father's Day in June 2024, Escaf posted on social media that he "did not celebrate" Father's Day and that he wouldn't ever wish a happy day to his father, urging men who have children "not to be the monthly paycheck's dad" and not to be their children's "cause going to therapy."

In his July 2022 congressional oath of office, Escaf honored his late mother, and was accompanied by his sister (who resides in Spain) and his three children.

Escaf married María Antonia Pardo, his high school girlfriend, and had two children with her. They divorced in 2016, after it surfaced that Escaf had maintained an affair with another woman (Adriana Berrió) with whom he had his third child, while still married to Pardo. Due to being intoxicated when he had the affair with Berrió, he was taken to court to make him comply with child support. According to Escaf, it was a standalone night with Berrió, contradicting her statement to the court, where she said that they maintained a prolonged romantic relationship.

== Electoral history ==
Year	Office	Party	Alliance	Votes			Result	Ref.
Year	Office	Party	Alliance	Total	%	P.	Result	Ref.
2022	Deputy	Humane Colombia	Historic Pact for Colombia	2,922,409	17.62%	1st (Note: Presented on an electoral list. The data shown represents the share of the vote the entire party/alliance received in the parliamentary election.)	Won	
Source: International Foundation for Electoral Systems | Election Guide

== Selected works ==
=== TV roles ===
Year	Title	Notes
1995	Las Ejecutivas	TV series
1995	Padres e Hijos	
2002	Mujer, Casos de la Vida Real	
2005-2006	La Tormenta	
2013	Tres Caínes	
2017	Hermanos y hermanas	

=== Filmography ===
Year	Title	Role
2004	The Art of Losing	Cop
