= Search Bloc =

Colombian National Police special operations unit

- Bloque de búsqueda
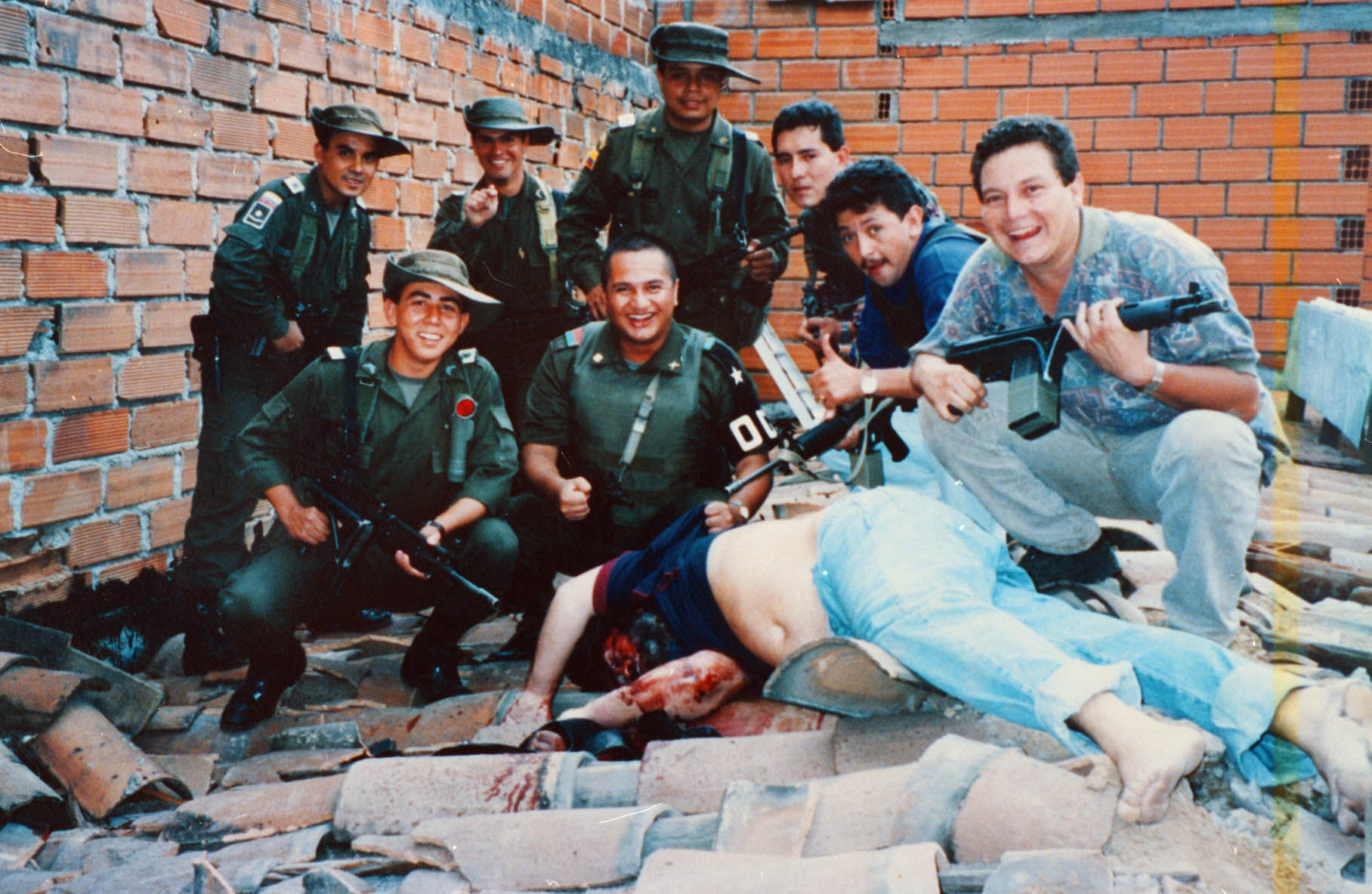
- Members of Colonel Martinez's Search Bloc celebrate over Pablo Escobar's body on 2 December 1993. Escobar's death ended a sixteen-month effort that cost hundreds of millions of dollars.
- Active: 1986 to 1993
- Country: Colombia
- Branch: Colombian National Police; National Army of Colombia
- Type: Special operations police unit
- Size: 500
- Garrison/HQ: Bogotá
- Engagements: Colombian conflict

Commanders
- Notable commanders: Hugo Martínez Poveda

The Search Bloc (Spanish: Bloque de Búsqueda) is the name of three different ad hoc special operation units of the National Police of Colombia. They were originally organized with a focus on capturing or killing highly dangerous individuals or groups of individuals.

== First Search Bloc ==
The original Search Bloc was created in 1986 by President Virgilio Barco, initially under the name of the Grupo Élite de la Policía (Elite Police Group), with the sole objective of apprehending drug lord Pablo Escobar and his associates. Its original commander was Colonel Hugo Martinez.

Over 600 Search Bloc members received training from the United States and the Colombian army and were specially selected to be impervious to police corruption from the drug cartels. Throughout its mission, Search Bloc faced many obstacles, including a spy within the group. There were claims that the Search Bloc collaborated with anti-Escobar vigilante groups such as Los Pepes, including vigilantism in the suspicious deaths of Escobar's subordinates.

Escobar was killed on December 2, 1993, in a shootout with members of the Search Bloc.

After dismantling the Medellín Cartel, the Search Bloc was transferred to Cali to locate and shut down the Cali Cartel.

== Second Search Bloc ==
The Search Bloc was revived in 2004 to root out cocaine and heroin traffickers in southwest Colombia. The new Search Bloc was tasked with taking apart the Norte del Valle cartel and arresting its leader, Diego León Montoya Sánchez, which it did successfully in 2007.

== Third Search Bloc ==
In 2007, the Colombian government again ordered the creation of a new Search Bloc against the Águilas Negras, or Black Eagles, classified as a gang of former paramilitaries.

== See also ==
- Pablo Escobar
- La Catedral
- Los Pepes
