= Vicente Castaño =

Colombian terrorist and drugpin

Vicente Castaño Gil
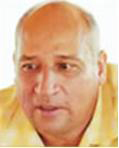
- Born: July 2, 1957 (age 69); Amalfi, Antioquia; Colombia
- Disappeared: March 2007
- Military career
- Allegiance: United Self-Defense Forces of Colombia (AUC)
- Rank: Bloc commander and United Self-Defense Forces of Colombia leader
- Nickname: "El Profe" (en:The teacher)
- Unit: Peasant Self-Defense Forces of Cordoba and Uraba
- Conflicts: Cold War/War on drugs: Colombian conflict

José Vicente Castaño-Gil, alias El Profe (born July 2, 1957 - disappeared in 2007), was a former leader and founder of the United Self-Defense Forces of Colombia (AUC), a right-wing Colombian paramilitary organization. After demobilizing from AUC, he was accused of murdering his brother and former AUC leader Carlos Castaño and of narcotics trafficking by both the Colombian government and the government of the United States. In August 2004, the United States formally requested his extradition and in August 2006 was added to the Narcotics Rewards Program with a reward of capture for 5,000,000 USD. Castaño remained, however, a fugitive until his apparent death in 2007 and was the presumed chief of the criminal organization Águilas Negras made up of former AUC paramilitary members.

== Biography ==
=== Early life ===
Castaño was born July 2, 1957, in Amalfi, a small village in the Antioquia Department in central Colombia. He was the sixth among twelve siblings of a family of farmers. When he was 12 years old he dropped out from school to help his father on farming duties. At the age of 18 he left the village and went to neighboring Venezuela where he also worked on farming for two years. Back in Colombia, Castaño worked with his brother Fidel Castaño in many businesses including a pub, gold exchange in Segovia, Antioquia, and farming. They later moved to Medellín where they worked in the lottery business. His nickname is due to his knowledge of agronomy, which was compared to a Colombian TV program named El Profesor Yarumo.

=== Father's death ===
Castaño's father died on September 18, 1981, at the hands of the FARC-EP, a leftist rebel organization. The FARC had kidnapped the elder Castaño and demanded a ransom of 150 million pesos.

== Family ==
Vicente Castaño is the brother of Fidel Castaño, a leader of Los Pepes and the founder of Peasant Self-Defenders of Córdoba and Urabá and Carlos Castaño Gil, who led the AUC until his death. Vicente has been accused of ordering Carlos' death.

== Possible death ==
Several sources claim that Castaño was assassinated under the orders of Diego Murillo Bejarano in retaliation for taking controls of territory and criminal rackets.

== Popular culture ==
- In TV series El Cartel is portrayed by an anonymous actor as the character of Leopoldo Aguilar.
- In colombian TV series Tres Caínes is portrayed by the colombian actor Elkin Díaz.
