= San Pedro de Urabá =

- Municipality and town

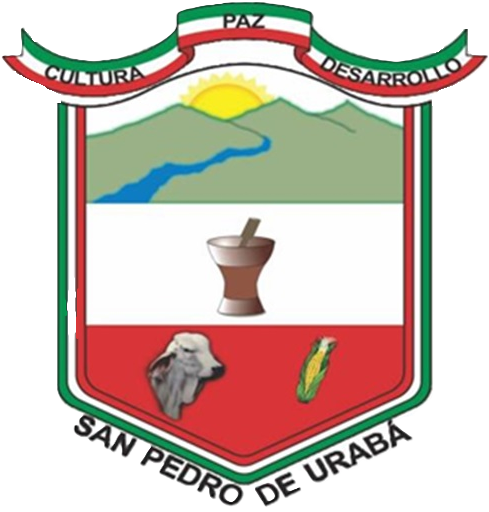
- Flag Coat of arms

- Location of the municipality and town of San Pedro de Urabá in the Antioquia Department of Colombia

- Location in Colombia
- Coordinates: 8°17′0″N 76°23′0″W
- Country: Colombia
- Department: Antioquia Department
- Subregion: Urabá

Population (Census 2018)
  - Total: 30,527
- Time zone: UTC-5 (Colombia Standard Time)

San Pedro de Urabá (Spanish pronunciation: [sam ˈpeðɾo ðe wɾaˈβa]) is a municipality in Antioquia Department, Colombia. It is part of the Urabá Antioquia sub-region.

== Climate ==
San Pedro de Urabá has a tropical monsoon climate (Am) with moderate to little rainfall from December to March and heavy rainfall in the remaining months.

Climate data for San Pedro de Urabá
Month	Jan	Feb	Mar	Apr	May	Jun	Jul	Aug	Sep	Oct	Nov	Dec	Year
Mean daily maximum °C (°F)	30.9 (87.6)	30.8 (87.4)	31.0 (87.8)	31.3 (88.3)	30.3 (86.5)	30.5 (86.9)	30.7 (87.3)	30.7 (87.3)	30.2 (86.4)	30.0 (86.0)	29.9 (85.8)	30.5 (86.9)	30.6 (87.0)
Daily mean °C (°F)	26.2 (79.2)	26.3 (79.3)	26.5 (79.7)	26.6 (79.9)	25.9 (78.6)	26.1 (79.0)	26.1 (79.0)	26.2 (79.2)	25.9 (78.6)	26.0 (78.8)	26.0 (78.8)	26.1 (79.0)	26.2 (79.1)
Mean daily minimum °C (°F)	21.6 (70.9)	21.9 (71.4)	22.1 (71.8)	21.9 (71.4)	21.6 (70.9)	21.7 (71.1)	21.6 (70.9)	21.7 (71.1)	21.7 (71.1)	22.0 (71.6)	22.2 (72.0)	21.8 (71.2)	21.8 (71.3)
Average rainfall mm (inches)	52 (2.0)	49 (1.9)	57 (2.2)	160 (6.3)	233 (9.2)	188 (7.4)	203 (8.0)	208 (8.2)	204 (8.0)	196 (7.7)	154 (6.1)	95 (3.7)	1,799 (70.7)
Source: Climate-Data.org
