= Mapiripán massacre =

1997 paramilitary attack in Colombia

Coordinates: 2.8919°N 72.1336°W

- Location: Mapiripán, Meta; Colombia
- Date: July 15 – July 20, 1997
- Target: Civilians
- Attack type: Shooting, mass murder, massacre
- Weapon: Chainsaws
- Deaths: 30
- Perpetrator: AUC

The Mapiripán massacre was a massacre of civilians that took place in Mapiripán, Meta Department, Colombia. The massacre was carried out from July 15–20, 1997, by the United Self-Defence Forces of Colombia (AUC), an outlawed right-wing paramilitary group.

On July 12, 1997, two planes containing paramilitary members arrived at the airport of San José del Guaviare, which also served as a base for the anti-narcotics police. The group then travelled through territories where the Colombian National Army operated checkpoints.

On July 15, 1997, the paramilitaries arrived at Mapiripán, where they used chainsaws and machetes to murder, behead, dismember, and disembowel civilians. Because the bodies were thrown into a river, it is unknown exactly how many people died but the United States Department of State stated in 2003 that at least 30 civilians were killed.

In proceedings before the Inter-American Court of Human Rights, the government of Colombia admitted that members of its military forces also played a role in the massacre, through omission. General Jaime Uscátegui allegedly ordered local troops under his command to stay away from the area in which the murders were taking place until the paramilitaries finished the massacre and left. After retirement, Uscátegui was later prosecuted, put on trial, and subsequently acquitted. On November 25, 2009, the Superior Tribunal of Bogotá revoked the previous sentence, and sentenced Uscátegui to 40 years in prison.

== Convictions ==
Jaime Humberto Uscategui, a former army general who had ignored calls for help during the massacre, was arrested in 1999. His trial took place in a military court and he was given forty months in prison for "omission" in 2001.

On November 25, 2009, the Bogotá superior tribunal announced in a ruling of ninety pages that it had passed a forty-year prison sentence on 61-year-old General Uscategui. It was the longest sentence that had ever been given to an army officer in Colombia's history. Uscategui was found guilty of kidnapping, murder, and falsifying public documents. He declared his innocence, saying "I have the tranquillity of innocence and I also have the tranquillity of proof".

Colonel Hernán Orozco, the battalion commander accused of failing to stop the massacre, was also given a forty-year sentence for murder in 2007.

== Carecuchillo surrender ==
One of the paramilitary leaders allegedly responsible for the massacre, Dumas de Jesús Castillo Guerrero, a.k.a. "Carecuchillo", surrendered to authorities on May 20, 2008, after having been considered dead for half a year.

== See also ==
- List of massacres in Colombia
- War on drugs
