= Peasant Self-Defenders of Córdoba and Urabá =

Colombian paramilitary

Autodefensas Campesinas de Córdoba y Urabá (ACCU), Spanish for Field Workers Self-Defenders of Córdoba and Urabá, was a paramilitary group formed in northwestern Colombia, operating mainly in the Antioquia Department and Córdoba Department. It was founded by Fidel Castaño, Carlos Castaño and Vicente Castaño to retaliate against the assassination of their father Jesús Castaño by FARC-EP guerrillas.

The Colombian military had been supporting farmers' efforts by training some of them in military doctrine, which also had military veterans or retirees in their lines. The Army was authorized to do this following the Colombian constitutional article that supported civilian arming as self-defense against a threat to their rights, and the Castaño brothers as well as other farmers in the region had armed themselves and hired bodyguards following this principle. The military officially cut its links with these groups after finding out some of its members had ties to drug dealers.

By 1994, several of these farmers had grouped together forming a small army to fight the guerrillas as part of the ACCU, led by Fidel Castaño and still being financed by drug dealers. The ACCU's first intentions were to protect their members' farms from being attacked by guerrillas and to defend those farmers' interests when threatened, including the protection of illegal drug crops and laboratories. The ACCU systematically eliminated left-wing sympathizers and peasant activists opposed to the farmers.

After Fidel Castaño's disappearance, his brother Carlos took over the ACCU and eventually led it to the formation of the United Self-Defenders of Colombia (AUC), which grouped other small paramilitary armies organized throughout Colombia. Within the newly created AUC, Castaño's ACCU continued to be the most powerful force for most of its existence.

== See also ==
- Colombian conflict
- United Self-Defense Forces of Colombia
