= José Orlando Henao Montoya =

Colombian drug lord (1953–1998)

- Born: 5 May 1953; Cartago, Colombia
- Died: 13 November 1998 (aged 45); Bogotá, Colombia
- Cause of death: Gunshot wounds
- Other names: El Hombre del Overol (The Overall man); Oscar 1 Don H El empresario de la cocaína (The cocaine entrepreneur)
- Status: Deceased
- Penalty: 3 years

José Orlando Henao Montoya (5 May 1953 – 13 November 1998), also known by the nicknames 'Don H' and El Hombre del Overol (English: The Overall Man), was a Colombian drug lord who was one of the leaders of the notorious Norte del Valle Cartel along with his brothers and associates like Iván Urdinola Grajales. During his career he was considered an extremely cunning criminal and in the words of his former associates the Rodriguez Orejuela brothers "more bloodthirsty than Pablo Escobar".

== Early years ==
He was older brother of Arcángel, Ancizar, Fernando, Óscar Iván and Lorena Henao Montoya. He was a policeman and went on to work in the Cali Cartel's cocaine laboratories, colloquially called "kitchens", giving him his characteristic nickname. He would later become head of the labs, rising through the ranks to become a mid-level commander in the cartel.

== Rise of Norte del Valle Cartel ==
After the defeat of Pablo Escobar and the end of the Medellín Cartel, the Prosecutor General's Office, after a series of negotiations, proposed to the Cali Cartel a surrender that would include house arrest for its members, without expropriation of their money and possessions, in exchange for putting an end to drug trafficking. A meeting of the entire Cali Cartel was arranged to discuss this proposal, but the mid-level commanders, led by Henao, refused for various reasons, causing the Cali Cartel to split, giving rise to the Norte del Valle Cartel.

His area of influence extended to the Cali metropolitan area and he was mainly investigated for transporting drugs from a laboratory owned by a man known in the drug trafficking world as "Bazuco" to the port of Buenaventura.

He did this with the active collaboration of retired Armed Forces officers, well equipped with high calibre weapons, means of communication and all-terrain vehicles. He was also investigated for illicit enrichment. Despite evidence of illicit enrichment, Prosecutor General Gustavo de Greiff refused to open an investigation against Henao.

After the capture of his former associates in the Cali Cartel, Henao gained power by bribing authorities, especially police Colonel Danilo González, and by allying himself with the paramilitaries led by Carlos Castaño Gil.

Henao, together with Colonel González and Castaño, instigated the assassination of Chepe Santacruz, who had escaped from prison, and other Cartel figures such as the hitman Nicol Parra, and William Rodríguez Abadía, who escaped unharmed. Subsequently and surprisingly, Henao met with the Rodríguez Orejuela brothers in prison and signed the peace agreement, convinced by his partner and friend Andrés López López.

Henao, fearing that he would be betrayed by his own associates to the DEA, took advantage of the mistreatment of Fernando Cifuentes by his boss Efraín Hernández "Don Efra", and on 6 November 1996, Cifuentes killed Hernández on Henao's orders and then Cifuentes was killed by Wilber Varela, the main hitman on Henao's orders.

== Surrender and death ==
After negotiating with his associates Juan Carlos Ramírez Abadía "Chupeta", Victor Patiño-Fomeque "El Químico" and Juan Carlos Ortiz Escobar "Cuchilla", surrendered after them to the justice system, taking advantage of his influence in the government, and would be sentenced to only 3 years in prison. However, Pacho Herrera and Miguel Rodríguez, taking advantage of Henao's surrender, ordered an attack on Varela, who was wounded, and later learned that Herrera was responsible. When Varela recovered, he asked Henao for authorisation to kill Herrera, which Henao initially refused, determined to maintain the peace agreed with the Rodríguez brothers and doubting that Herrera was behind the attack. However, Henao soon discovered that Herrera was negotiating with the DEA to hand over the heads of the Norte del Valle Cartel, and Henao authorised Varela to kill Herrera. Herrera was shot dead in prison on 6 November 1998.

José Manuel Herrera Moncada "El inválido" (The crippled), half-brother of Pacho Herrera and who was in the same prison with Henao, sensed that Henao and Varela were behind his brother's death and decided to take revenge, secretly smuggling in two weapons to the prison. Although Henao denied that he was responsible for the murder and offered him his friendship, and to help him kill Varela if he confirmed that he was responsible for Herrera's death, Henao was murdered on 13 November 1998 by "El inválido".

=== Consequences ===
Henao's murder marked the fragmentation of the Norte del Valle Cartel into two irreconcilable and rival factions; the Machos led by his cousin Diego Montoya ("Don Diego"), and the Rastrojos led by Wilber Varela, in addition to the violent Varela's reaction ordering the murder of the clan of the Herrera brothers, among them "El inválido" in Guayaquil, Ecuador, and the exile of others of them.

== In popular culture ==
- In 2008 Caracol TV produced the TV Series El cartel, where Henao is portrayed by the colombian actor Fernando Solórzano as the character of Óscar Cadena. Solórzano reprises his role in film version The Snitch Cartel and El Señor de los Cielos (season 1).
- In Netflix series Narcos, Henao is portrayed by the Colombian actor Julian Arango, who portrayed before Álvaro José Pérez 'Guadaña' in El Cartel.
