= Danilo González =

Colombian military personnel

- Born: Danilo Alfonso González Gil; 1959; Buga, Santander
- Died: March 25, 2004 (aged 44–45); Bogotá
- Education: General Santander National Police Academy
- Known for: Policeman, double-agent and businessman
- Police career
- Department: Colombian National Police
- Service years: 1994–2000
- Rank: Lieutenant Colonel

Danilo Alfonso González Gil (1959 in Buga – March 25, 2004, in Bogotá) was a former Lieutenant Colonel of the Colombian National Police. He became director of intelligence for GAULA, thus a key player in the rescue of the kidnapped brother of former President César Gaviria.

Gonzalez's life was controversial, as although he is considered an exemplary police officer and a key player in the fight against drug trafficking in Colombia, others consider him a double agent who worked in conjunction with the Cali and Norte del Valle cartels with the acquiescence of the government, which eventually demanded his resignation. He was assassinated in Bogotá on the orders of drug trafficker Don Diego as he was preparing to surrender to US justice. At the time he was a shareholder in several hotels and owner of several real estate properties.

== Early years ==
González Gil was born in Buga, Valle del Cauca, the youngest of a family of eight children dedicated to coffee cultivation. His father was killed when González was just a child. As a teenager, González went to Bogotá and then enrolled in the General Santander Police Cadet School, where he was recognised as an outstanding student, graduating as the best student in 1977. He was sent to Barranquilla to fight crime in that city.

== War against the Medellín Cartel ==
Due to his intelligence training in Argentina, González was selected to form the Elite Command whose mission was to capture the leader of the Medellín Cartel, Pablo Escobar. This was the first stage that culminated in June 1991 when Escobar was imprisoned in La Catedral prison in Envigado.

In 1992, when Escobar escaped from prison, the Search Bloc was reactivated and an alliance between the Cali Cartel, paramilitaries; which created Los Pepes.

González maintained contacts with the Pepes, obtaining information to capture Escobar, which was achieved on December 2, 1993, although it is rumoured that at the time of Escobar's capture, González was on holiday in Cartagena.

== Subsequent career and resignation ==
In Ernesto Samper's government he was appointed director of the police anti-kidnapping squad GAULA. In 1996 González once again allied with drug trafficker Victor Patiño-Fomeque to secure the release of Juan Carlos Gaviria, brother of former Colombian President César Gaviria. Gonzalez is believed to have orchestrated the kidnapping to further destabilise the Samper government, which was affected by Proceso 8000.

González at the same time got credit for apparently commanding the police squad that killed drug lord José Santacruz Londoño, in an alleged alliance with paramilitary chief Carlos Castaño Gil, which turned out to be a set-up as Castaño would kill Santacruz at the instigation of the Norte del Valle Cartel.

His forced resignation, imposed by the government, was apparently due to his closeness to the underworld, although according to Andrés López in his book El Cartel de los sapos, this relationship had been well known since his involvement with the police. González later worked with drug traffickers Luis Hernando Gómez Rasguño and Wilber Varela Jabón in security and as a liaison with the police, who were corrupted by drug traffickers. Rasguño accuses him of having assassinated conservative leader Álvaro Gómez Hurtado. At the same time, in Jorge 40's book, he mentions that in May 1997 Salvatore Mancuso and eight other men were imprisoned one night and interrogated by a prosecutor, who, through the efforts of paramilitary leader González, arrived with an order from the police commander to let them go.

== Assassination ==
Gonzalez's position began to be compromised after he convinced Victor Patiño to surrender to US justice, which brought him the hatred of Luis Alfonso Ocampo Tocayo, Patiño's half-brother, and both became DEA informants, leading to Ocampo's assassination by Juan Carlos Ramirez Chupeta and his men. Despite this, he continued to work with Varela, which led the US justice system to order his arrest for drug trafficking and money laundering. González moved to Bogotá to contact Baruch Vega, an alleged DEA double agent who would mediate his surrender. Gonzalez was killed by a former police captain Jaime Hernan Pineda Pedro Pineda or Pispis at a time when Gonzalez was with a lawyer preparing his surrender to the DEA and also arranging for the transfer of his assets to his wife and children. Gonzalez maintained contact with Pineda because he was threatened with death by Don Diego, who wanted to avenge the capture of a relative of his led by Gonzalez. Pineda killed González to gain Don Diego's trust, or apparently on his orders.

In 2004, the then Colonel Oscar Naranjo, who became Director of the National Police and later vice-president of Colombia, asked the then Director General Jorge Daniel Castro Castro for permission to attend his funeral, as they had been friends while they were in the institution.

== Popular culture ==
- In the book El general serrucho published in 2002 by Manuel Vicente Peña, a retired colonel known by the alias Daniel, who was director of the Gaula, is named as the ex-police chief of the Norte del Valle Cartel, and nowadays it is known that he was Danilo González.
- In the series of Caracol Television, El Cartel (2010), González is portrayed by actor Alberto Palacio as the character of Colonel Ramiro Gutiérrez.
- In the television series Pablo Escobar, The Drug Lord (2012) by Carlos Moreno, González is portrayed by Colombian actor Luis Fernando Montoya as the character of Ramiro Becerra.
- In the television series Tres Caínes (2013) González is portrayed by the Colombian actor Juan Carlos Solarte as the character of Daniel Góngora.
