= Eduardo Restrepo Victoria =

- Born: September 29, 1958 (age 68); Pitalito, Huila; Colombia
- Other name: El Socio
- Occupation: Member of the Norte del Valle Cartel
- Status: Captured
- Criminal charges: Drug trafficking and smuggling, racketeering, money laundering, Conformation of paramilitary groups in Colombia

Eduardo Restrepo Victoria alias "El Socio" (the Associate) (born September 29, 1958, in Pitalito, Huila) is a Colombian drug trafficker former member of the Norte del Valle Cartel and associate of Wilber Varela. Restrepo was wanted by Colombian authorities on charges of illegal drug trade, illicit enrichment and illegal arms possession. He was captured by Colombian and United States authorities on July 25, 2006. On July 20, 2006, the United States government asked for his extradition. He was extradited to the United States on December 10, 2007.

== Early years ==
Restrepo was born and raised in the outskirts of Pitalito in the Department of Huila in central Colombia to a family of peasants workers. Most of his early life was spent working on rice fields in Lérida, Department of Tolima after migrating for better luck. In Lérida, Restrepo met important rice producers who employed him, including associates of Diego León Montoya Sánchez, and worked in haciendas that had airstrips in Espinal, Ibagué and Venadillo. He became a sort of air controller for flights used by the mafia of the Norte del Valle Cartel back then led by Montoya-Sánchez, among others.

== Drug trafficking ==
According to Colombian National Police accounts, after being introduced to the illegal drug trade Restrepo began to manage properties of another drug baron, Henry Loaiza Ceballos aka "El Alacran". Loaiza sent him to Mexico in 1995 where he established contacts with the Mexican Drug Cartel; the Juarez Cartel led by Amado Carrillo Fuentes aka "El Senor de los Cielos". In Mexico Restrepo massed a fortune by controlling drug flow and the contacts between the Colombian and Mexican drug cartels.

=== Return to Colombia ===
Restrepo returned to Colombia in late 2000 and began a purchase spree of haciendas, nightclubs, commercial establishments, office buildings and luxury apartments and vehicles. He also associated with Wílber Alirio Varela aka "Jabón" another boss of the Norte del Valle Cartel.

In 2001 the then governor of the Department of Tolima Guillermo Alfonso Jaramillo alerted authorities about his behavior and eccentricities. Restrepo then went clandestine.

On August 25, 2005, four witnesses testified against Restrepo alleging that he had links to mafias and to paramilitary groups associated to the United Self-Defense Forces of Colombia; the Tolima Bloc. Witnesses mentioned that Restrepo and partner Wílber Varela had been planning to purchase part of the paramilitary unit.

=== Arrest ===
In 2004 an Attorney General's unit raided one of Restrepo's properties in the outskirts of Ibagué with an arrest warrant for delinquency, production and traffic and porting unauthorized firearms.

On Sunday July 23, 2006 the Colombian National Police intercepted a phone call of Restrepo calling a family member asking him to appeal to two businessmen from the Department of Tolima to lend him the farm Andalucia, located in the municipality of Subachoque, Department of Cundinamarca.

On July 25, 2006, the Colombian National Police intelligence unit DIJIN raided the farm and found him with one more person along with his two daughters and two men.

When inquired by the Colombian Attorney General's office Restrepo answered "I've never worked with drugs". He also denied knowing anyone named Wilber Alirio Varela. He denied the testimony given by his former body guard Robinson Guilombo which linked him to the Norte del Valle Cartel. Guilombo is under the protection of the DEA and Attorney General's units.

== Properties ==
According to Colombian authorities Restrepo has some 900 properties in Colombian and Mexico. His two sisters Teresa and Norma served him as money-launderers, and racketeered through a company named Agropecuaria Palma del Río which was based in Ibagué and in 2005 was included in the Office of Foreign Assets Control's specially designated nationals list of the United States Department of the Treasury. Another syndicated money-launderer was pointed out by his bodyguard as Gustavo Adolfo Villanueva along one of his sisters and a former lover.

On September 7, 2005, the Colombian National Police raided and confiscated 65 properties belonging to Restrepo in Bogotá, Cali and the Department of Tolima.

== Popular culture ==
In the second season of the TV Series El cartel, Restrepo is portrayed by the Colombian actor Gastón Velandia as the character of Renso Cobo aka. 'Compadre Don Teto'.
