= Carlos Alberto Rentería Mantilla =

Colombian drug trafficker (1953–1998)

- Born: 11 May 1945; Tuluá, Colombia
- Died: 16 September 2020 (aged 77); Tuluá, Colombia
- Cause of death: Gunshot wounds
- Status: Deceased
- Penalty: 18 years

Carlos Alberto "Beto" Rentería Mantilla (11 March 1945; Tuluá – 16 September 2020; Tuluá, Valle del Cauca) was a former Colombian narcotrafficker and crime boss, presumed leader of the Norte del Valle Cartel. Rentería was believed by the United States government to be holding a leadership position within the drug cartel, he had been labeled "one of Colombia's most powerful and sophisticated narcotics traffickers" by Adam Szubin, Director of the Office of Foreign Assets Control, United States Department of the Treasury. The Attorney General of Colombia and the Colombian National Police accuse Rentería of drug trafficking and money laundering.

== Role ==
As chief in the Norte del Valle Cartel, it is believed Rentería shared in the decision making of the cartel in aspects of transportation of drug shipments, bribery of political officials and assassinations. Rentería also operated his own organization under the Cartel capable of multi-ton cocaine shipments, as well as investing in other cocaine smuggling transports. The Norte del Valle cartel operates principally out of the North Valle del Cauca region. It is believed the cocaine is shipped from around the neighboring Colombian Departments as well as Peru and other South American countries before being transported again via trucks and airplanes to the Pacific Coast port of Buenaventura, Colombia. From Buenaventura the cocaine, through Renterías' operation, is primary transported to Mexico before being shipped again to the United States via go-fast boats, fishing vessels, and other maritime shipping methods.

== Government actions ==
=== Law enforcement ===
While it is believed Rentería had been involved in drug trafficking since the 1970s, the first indictment regarding Rentería was unsealed in 1994 in the Southern District of Florida, charging Rentería with conspiracy to import, possess and distribute cocaine in the United States. In 2004 an indictment was unsealed in the District Court for the District of Columbia, charging Rentería with violating the Racketeer Influenced and Corrupt Organizations Act (RICO). In addition to the indictments a reward of $5 million was placed for information leading to the capture of Rentería.

=== Finances ===
Beginning on March 17, 2005, the United States Department of Treasury announced its first actions targeting the financial holdings of Rentería. In 2005 Rentería was first declared a Specially Designated Narcotics Trafficker, the label permits the United States to seize assets connected to Rentería through front companies and associates. Since 2005 the Department of Treasury had announced over seven actions targeting Renterías financial holdings. The companies designated range from agricultural, clinics, hotels, accounting firms and the Colombian soccer team Cortuluá. It is believed Renterías' money contributed significantly to the economic growth in the area, as business operations, hotels and clinics began to be built to launder his money through.

On September 1, 2006, Colombian authorities confiscated around 34 properties in the northern Caribbean region, mainly in the city of Cartagena and in other regions of Colombia; in the capital Bogotá and near his major area of operations; Valle del Cauca Department. The operation was dubbed "Patria 44" by the Colombian Central Directorate of the Judicial Police and Intelligence (DIJIN).

=== Arrest and extradition ===
On July 4, 2010, at 4:00 p.m. Mantilla was captured in Venezuela by local security forces with the assistance of British intelligence services.

He was extradited to the United States on July 13, 2010.

== Death ==
In February 2018, at the age of 72, he was allowed to return to Colombia, only to be recaptured by the CTI (Technical Investigation Corps) and subsequently imprisoned in La Picota. Nothing was heard of him until September 16, 2020, when, during a visit to acquaintances in the Sajonia neighborhood of Tuluá, hitmen from an unknown group approached his home and shot him, killing him instantly.

== Popular culture ==
Rentería is portrayed by Colombian actor Luis Fernando Montoya as the character of 'The Primo' (the cousin) in the second season of TV Series El Cartel as the cousin of Milton Jimenez 'El Cabo' (Wilber Varela 'Jabón'), although in the series 'Primo' is killed in Venezuela by the corrupt General Morales.

== See also ==
- Cali Cartel
- Cocaine
- Cuba-United States relations
- Narcotrafficking in Colombia
- Norte del Valle Cartel
- Medellín Cartel
