= Iván Urdinola Grajales =

Colombian criminal

- Born: 1 December 1960; El Dovio, Colombia
- Died: 24 February 2002 (aged 41); Itagüí, Colombia
- Other name: El Enano (The dwarf)
- Spouse: Lorena Henao Montoya
- Children: 3
- Status: Deceased
- Penalty: 17 years

Iván Urdinola Grajales (1 December 1960 – 2 February 2002), also known by the nickname el enano (English: The Dwarf), was a Colombian drug lord who was one of the leaders of the notorious Norte del Valle Cartel. Grajales was the co-perpetrator of the Trujillo massacre, which occurred between 1988 and 1992.

== Early years ==
Despite being born into a wealthy family, Urdinola gave up studying at the university due to poverty and an economic crisis in Colombia. He settled in Cartago where he started a meat business installing a refrigerator. He would later go on to work in the Cali Cartel after personally meeting the brothers Gilberto and Miguel Rodríguez Orejuela. He built his own heroin trafficking network. Urdinola became a middle command of the Cartel and trusted by the Rodríguez Orejuela brothers operating in the North of the Valle del Cauca Department.

=== Personal life ===
Urdinola married Lorena Henao Montoya, sister of his partner Orlando Henao, and with whom he had 3 children.

== Arrest ==
After several months of intelligence, in April 1992 the police finally found the Urdinola's residence La Porcelana in Zarzal, with some of his bodyguards. Urdinola, without putting up any kind of resistance, asked the security forces officer in charge of the operation for a few minutes to bathe, change his clothes, and say goodbye to his wife and children. Urdinola calmly surrendered, confident that drug trafficking charges against him could not be proven, although he could not be extradited either since extradition was prohibited by the Constitution at that time.

He was sentenced to 17 years in prison, although his sentence was reduced to 4 years.

== Death ==
In jail, Urdinola became addicted to greasy food and whiskey. He was found dead in his cell on February 24, 2002. It was initially believed that he had been poisoned by a chef on the orders of his wife, Lorena Henao, but an autopsy revealed a heart attack.

== Popular culture ==
- In the TV series El Cartel is portrayed by the colombian actor Fernando Arevalo as the character of Julio Trujillo.
- In the series En la boca del lobo is portrayed by the colombian actor Weimar Delgado as the character of Iván Guardiola.
- In the series Surviving Escobar: Alias JJ he appears under the name of Iván Urrego and was portrayed by actor Toto Vega.
