= Los Rastrojos =

Defunct Colombian drug cartel

Los Rastrojos (Rondas Campesinas Populares)
- Los Rastrojos Comandos Urbanos
- Founded: 2004; 22 years ago
- Founder: Wilber Varela and Diego Pérez Henao
- Founding location: Cali, Valle del Cauca, Colombia
- Years active: 2004–present
- Territory: Colombia, Venezuela, Ecuador, Central America, Mexico
- Ethnicity: Colombians and criminals of various ethnicity are employed
- Membership: 310 (as of February 2017)
- Criminal activities: Murder, drug trafficking, extortion, arms trafficking, money laundering and illegal gold mining
- Allies: Sinaloa Cartel; Barrera cartel The Office of Envigado
- Rivals: Clan del Golfo; ELN

Los Rastrojos is a Colombian drug cartel and neo-paramilitary group engaged in the Colombian armed conflict. The group was formed by Norte del Valle Cartel capo Wilber Varela, alias "Jabón" and one of his right-hand men, "Diego Rastrojo", around 2004 when Varela fell out with fellow-capo Diego Leon Montoya, alias "Don Diego". The group became independent after the murder of its main founder in Venezuela in 2008 and at its height was one of the most important drug trafficking organizations in Colombia.

The group funds itself primarily by trafficking cocaine, marijuana and heroin, and illegal gold mining, thus taking advantage of high gold prices in 2010 and 2011.

Los Rastrojos are, together with the Norte del Valle Cartel, considered the "heirs" of the Cali cartel. Other reports allege Los Rastrojos are in fact the same as the Norte del Valle Cartel, only working under a new name and taking advantage 'of a strong network of assassins, distributors and contacts in the international markets'. The group focuses on buying coca from the source, processing it themselves and selling it wholesale for international distribution or shipping it themselves through Central America and Mexico.

They are believed to operate mainly in Valle del Cauca and Cali, although there are reports of them spreading their zone of influence to other parts of Colombia and western Venezuela. In 2012, membership was estimated at 1,200 to 1,500 fighters and hitmen. Several members of Los Rastrojos have been killed or arrested in Venezuela by the Venezuelan armed forces.

The expansion of the group under the brothers Javier Antonio and Luis Enrique Calle Serna, both referred to as "Comba," was exponential. Since 2009, it left its traditional hub along the Pacific Coast to operate in a third of Colombia's 32 departments. The Rastrojos, who take their name from one of their militia leaders, are primarily engaged in exporting cocaine and heroin to international markets. At the local level, they are also involved in extortion and kidnapping. The Rastrojos move drugs primarily up the Pacific Coast to Central America and Mexico where they sell it to Mexican drug traffickers who take it to the United States. They also have control of one of the primary smuggling routes into Venezuela, which is a bridge for cocaine moving towards Europe and northwards into the US on aircraft and go-fast boats.

The Rastrojos were born out of the powerful Norte del Valle drug cartel and rose to become one of the most powerful transnational criminal syndicates in Colombia, until their top leadership surrendered or was captured in 2012. The last organized faction of Los Rastrojos was captured in 2017, and the group splintered into several fractions. By this point, the cartel was also reduced to having only 310 members and dependent on alliances with paramilitary groups in order to continue drug transportation. In July 2017, it was reported that Los Rastrojos now consisted of only three fractions. By March 2020, Los Rastrojos no longer had an alliance with the Colombian left-wing militant group National Liberation Army (ELN) and was now involved in a direct armed conflict with the group as well.

== Origins ==
The Rastrojos started in 2002, as the armed wing for Wilber Varela, alias "Jabón." At the time, Varela was fighting a rival in the Norte Del Valle Cartel, Diego Montoya, alias "Don Diego," and Montoya's private army, the "Machos." Varela lieutenant Diego Pérez Henao, alias "Diego Rastrojo", recruited its first members, hence the group took on his name."

== Consolidation ==
=== Conflict with FARC-EP and ELN ===
Los Rastrojos have frequently fought battles against the guerrilla groups FARC-EP (Fuerzas Armadas Revolucionarias de Colombia) and ELN (Ejército de Liberación Nacional) in the southern Cauca department.

Currently, the Rastrojos have an agreement with the National Liberation Army (Ejército de Liberación Nacional – ELN) for several years in the departments of Cauca and Nariño. More recently they obtained a similar agreement with the Revolutionary Armed Forces of Colombia (Fuerzas Armadas Revolucionarias de Colombia – FARC) in other parts of the country. In both cases, these alliances give the Rastrojos direct access to coca base, which provides them the raw material to convert into cocaine at very cheap prices. The Rastrojos' other ally, Daniel Barrera Barrera, alias "El Loco," struck similar agreements with the FARC in other areas until his arrest in September 2012. Together the Rastrojos and Barrera have obtained a huge competitive advantage, one that has also led to strong partnerships with Mexican cartels.

==== 2012 setbacks ====
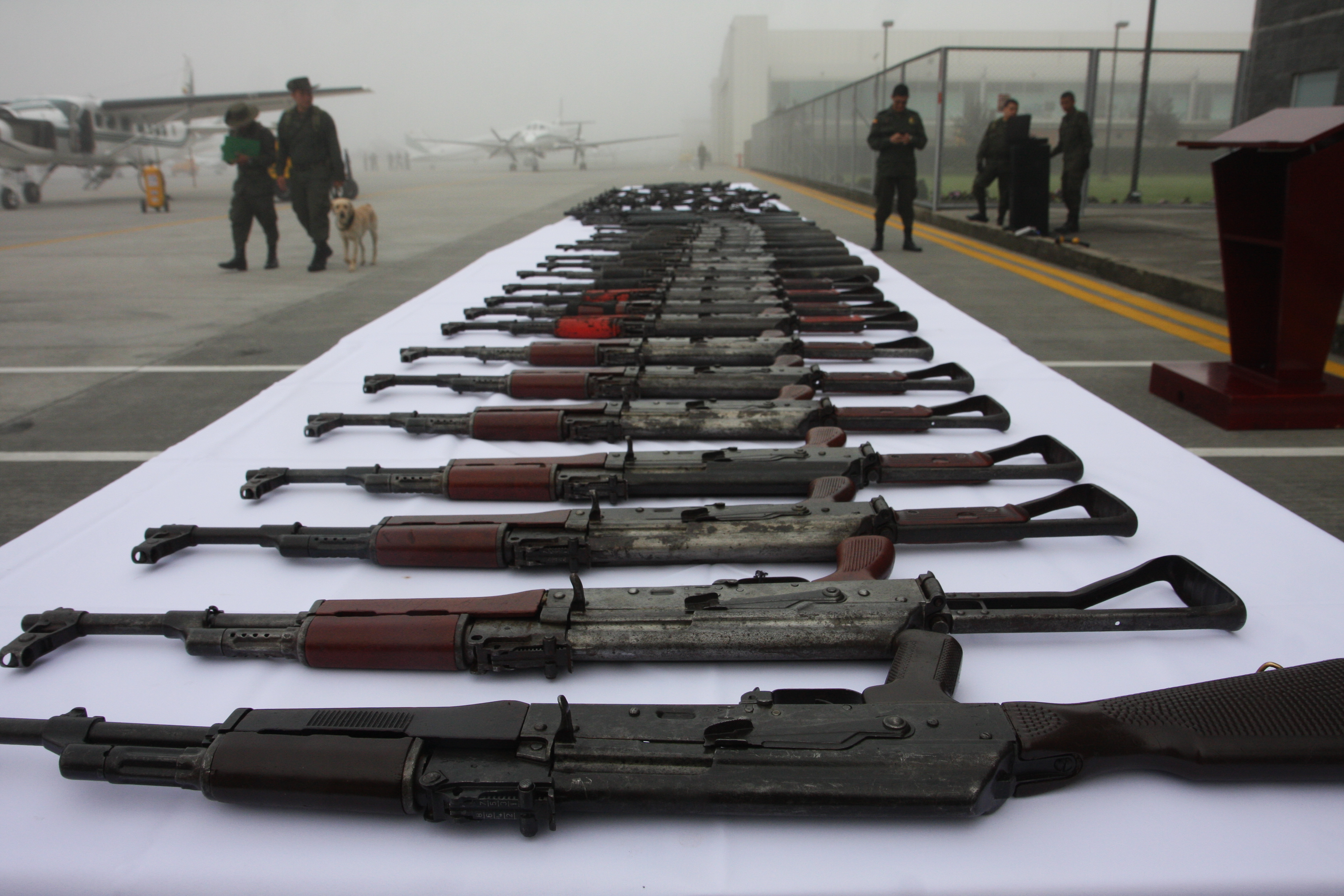
Seized weapons of the Rastrojos, unknown place and date

The Rastrojos suffered a series of major setbacks in 2012, a year in which all three of its top leaders either surrendered or were arrested. In May 2012 one of the leaders of Los Rastrojos, Javier Antonio Calle Serna (alias "Comba"), handed himself in to US authorities in Aruba. As a result, Diego Rastrojo and Calle Serna's brother Luis Enrique (also alias "Comba") became leaders; Rastrojo's leadership was short-lived, as he was captured in western Venezuela in early June. The Venezuelan government said it would hand him over to the Colombian authorities. "El Doctor" is accused of the murder of Varela, having been Varela's right-hand man for a decade. On October 4, Colombian authorities announced that Comba, the last remaining leader of the Rastrojos, also surrendered to U.S. narcotics agency DEA.

== Decline ==
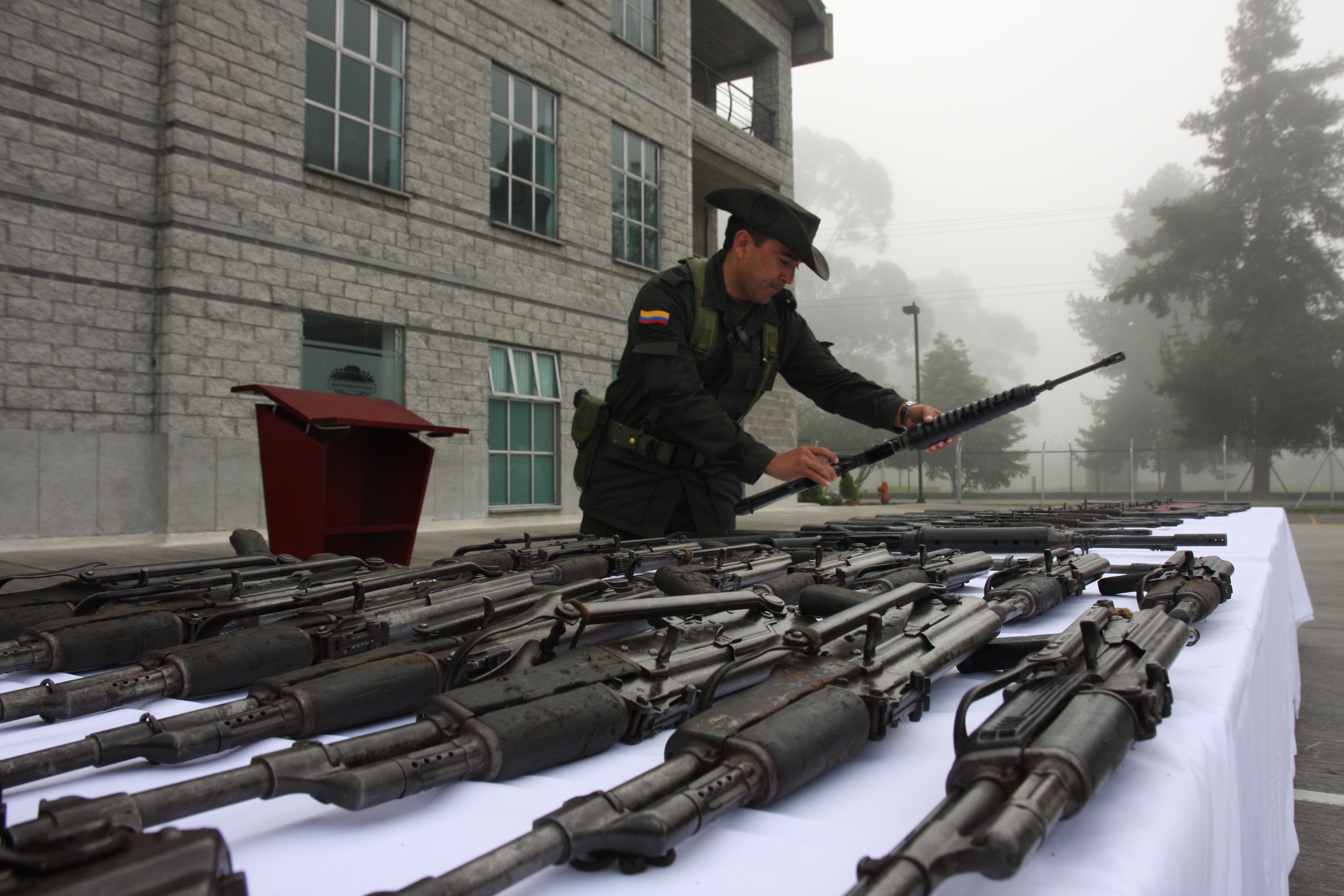
154 firearms seized by the DIJIN and the colombian Anti-Narcotics Force.

The last faction of Los Rastrojos was captured in February 2017. The same month, it was reported that the cartel was reduced to having only 310 members and now needed to rely on alliances with the National Liberation Army (Ejército de Liberación Nacional, ELN), the former Revolutionary Armed Forces of Colombia (Fuerzas Armadas Revolucionarias de Colombia, FARC), and other paramilitary organizations in order to continue transporting drugs. In July 2017, it was reported that there were only three fraction of Los Rastrojos, with 80 members in the region of Catatumbo, in northern Colombia. In October 2017, there were only 31 members of Los Rastrojos in Norte de Santander. By January 2018, 100 of the remaining Los Rastrojos members had joined five of the cartel's seven newly established debt collection agencies in the Cali region of Colombia.

In June 2019, alleged Los Rastrojos head Jon Jairo Durán Contreras, alias "El Menor," and his assistant Gerson Gregorio Rosario Aquino, known as "Torombolo," were captured by Cúcuta police following an incident of infighting which saw Los Rastrojos members killed in Boca de Grita, located in the Guaramito region of Venezuela's Táchira state.

On February 4, 2020, it was announced Cúcuta police officer Sthevenson Sanchez, who was revealed to be the assistant CFO of the local Los Rastrojos branch, was arrested the previous week. Cúcuta former mayor Ramiro Suarez had also been previously jailed for his ties with Los Rastrojos as well. On February 15, 2020, Venezuelan security forces seized and dismantled a suspected Los Rastrojos drug processing and contraband fuel operation in Boca de Grita. On February 17, 2020, 14 Los Rastrojos members were revealed to have been arrested in the Venezuelan border city of Boca de Grita. On March 30, 2020, the group was revealed to be now be in a conflict with the ELN after the bodies of eight Los Rastrojos members were found dead in a village in Cúcuta.

== Popular culture ==
In TV Series El cartel, they are referred as 'Los enterradores' (The undertakers).
