= Wilber Varela =

Colombian drug trafficker (1957–2008)

- Born: Wilber Alirio Varela Fajardo; November 6, 1957; Roldanillo, Valle del Cauca Department, Colombia
- Died: 2008 (aged 50–51); Mérida, Mérida, Venezuela
- Cause of death: Gunshot wound
- Body discovered: February 1, 2008
- Other names: El Jabón; El Negro; El Jefe; El Comandante
- Occupation: Drug trafficker
- Children: 5
- Allegiance: Norte del Valle Cartel
- Accomplice: Yovanna Guzmán

Wilber Alirio Varela Fajardo (November 6, 1957 – 2008), also known as Jabón ("Soap"), was a Colombian drug trafficker. He was the leader of the Norte del Valle Cartel. A Racketeer Influenced and Corrupt Organizations Act indictment was filed in the District Court of the District of Columbia by the Narcotics and Dangerous Drugs Section of the United States Department of Justice Criminal Division against the leaders of the Norte del Valle Cartel, including Varela. According to the indictment, the Norte del Valle Cartel exported approximately 500 metric tons of cocaine worth over $10 billion from Colombia to the United States, often through Mexico, between 1990 and 2004. The indictment was unsealed in May 2004. A provisional arrest warrant was issued and was sent to the U.S. Embassy in Bogotá.

In addition, in March 2004, a grand jury in the Eastern District of New York indicted Varela on Drug Trafficking Charges. The United States Department of State offered a reward of up to $5 million for information leading to the arrest and/or conviction of Varela.

== Early years ==
He was born in Roldanillo, Valle del Cauca, on November 6, 1957. Varela was a country man of humble extraction who did not like to show off, had few manners and was extremely rude. He was known to be a cold-blooded killer. His nickname was due to the coincidence with a well-known brand of laundry soap in Colombia also called Varela. He claimed to be a retired National Police sergeant, but no official documents were found to confirm this. At the beginning of the 1990s, he worked in the cocaine laboratories of Andrés López López "Florecita" (Little Flower) and later began working with the Rodríguez Orejuela brothers security, collections, and hiring assassins.

After the fragmentation of the Cali Cartel, Varela began working with Orlando Henao as his security and hitman chief. Varela was known for assassinating Fernando Cifuentes, apparently to avoid leaving loose ends in the crime of Efraín Hernández 'Don Efra'; for trying to assassinate William Rodríguez Abadía, son of Miguel Rodríguez Orejuela and for other crimes ordered by his boss Henao. After Henao's surrender to the authorities, Varela was the target of an attack on 23 November 1997 under the orders of Pacho Herrera. Varela asks Henao for authorization to kill Herrera, but Henao initially refuses in order to keep peace with the Rodríguez Orejuela brothers, but then gives Varela the green light when he sees Herrera's collaboration with the DEA to hand over the heads of the Norte del Valle Cartel. This led to the assassination of Herrera in Palmira prison and the subsequent murder of Henao in retaliation by José Manuel Henao 'El Inválido' (The crippled).

== Leadership ==
With Henao's death, Varela gradually took control of the organisation even though it was fragmented into several clans. Together with his personal friend Luis Alfonso Ocampo Fómeque 'El Tocayo' (The Namesake), half-brother of his partner Victor Patiño-Fomeque 'La Fiera', he carried out several murders, especially of 4 brothers of Pacho Herrera including 'El Inválido' in Guayaquil, Ecuador. The rest of the clan was forced to leave Colombia and were expropriated of their possessions by Varela.

=== War with 'Don Diego' ===
After the capture of Fernando Henao, brother of the murdered Orlando Henao Montoya, due to an alleged tip-off made by Miguel Solano 'Miguelito' to the FBI in Miami, and an alleged debt owed by him to Lorena Henao, a conflict was gradually unleashed which culminated in the death of Miguelito in a bar in Cartagena. It is worth noting that due to his violent way of acting, he declared war on Diego León Montoya Sánchez 'Don Diego', because this opposed the way in which he began to expropriate the assets of his deceased enemies and in retaliation for the death of Miguelito, who was his friend, Varela formed his private army, which he called Los Rastrojos, as opposed to Los Machos de Montoya, provoking a war that left a large number of people dead, which caused the Valle del Cauca and the Coffee Zone to become unsafe and dangerous places to live. He had a love affair with Lorena Henao to protect her from Diego Montoya, who denounced her and her brother Arcángel Henao, both exiled in Panama.

Varela also maintained his business with criminal networks in Mexico with different cartels in that country (mainly with Cartel de Juárez and El Cartel de los Beltrán Leyva). In fact, it is speculated that he was a close friend of Amado Carrillo Fuentes El Señor de los Cielos, as well as a close friend of the paramilitary commander Carlos Mario Jiménez Macaco, who managed to mediate between him and Diego Montoya to stop the war that both drug lords were waging. Varela tried in vain to turn his group 'Los Rastrojos' into a paramilitary group by seeking cover under the Justice and Peace agreements of Santa Fe de Ralito.

== Family ==
It is known about his family, a sister lives in Palmira, his father at the time of his death still resided in an old farm in Roldanillo; from his first marriage he had 2 children, among them the youngest Wilber Felipe Varela Camacho 'Varelita' who was murdered in 2009; Varela also had a relationship with Yovanna Guzmán; a model and beauty queen who was unaware that Varela was a druglord and who tricked her with a false name pretending to be a cattle rancher. Varela would later become obsessed with her until it was revealed that the drug lord had ordered his hitmen to shoot her in the spine because of a betrayal, but leaving her wounded in one of her legs.

== Death ==
During his war against 'Don Diego', Varela habitually hid in Venezuela where he was protected by Venezuelan authorities. After the end of his war, Varela was being hunted not only by Colombian and US authorities (who were offering a $5 million bounty on his head), but also by the Oficina de Envigado, and other criminal groups who wanted to collect the bounty. In Venezuela, Varela had conflicts with Venezuelan authorities who demanded more money for his protection, and for his drug shipments as well as being a major threat to several druglords. In early 2008, Varela Fajardo was found murdered with his main bodyguard Weimar Pérez 'Grasoso' (Fatty) in the Fresh Air cabins resort in the state of Mérida, in Venezuela. On January 30, 2008, Venezuelan authorities confirmed his death after analyzing his fingerprints. According to subsequent investigations, Varela was finally killed by his lieutenants Javier Antonio Calle Serna Comba or Combatiente and Diego Pérez Henao Diego Rastrojo, apparently following orders from druglord Daniel Barrera 'El Loco Barrera' (The Crazy Barrera).

== Popular culture ==
In TV series El Señor De Los Cielos, El Cartel and film, he is portrayed as the character Milton Jimenez 'El Cabo' (The Corporal), by the Colombian actor Robinson Diaz.

== See also ==
- Illegal drug trade in Colombia
- Illegal drug trade in Venezuela
