= Carlos Rentería =

Carlos Rentería may refer to:

- Carlos Alberto Rentería Mantilla (1945-2020), Colombian narcotrafficer and mob boss
- Carlos Rentería (footballer, born 1986), Colombian football striker
- Carlos Rentería (footballer, born 1995), Colombian football defensive midfielder
