= Luis Hernando Gómez =

Colombian drug trafficker (born 1958)

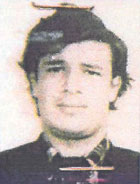
Luis Hernando Gomez Bustamante

Luis Hernando Gómez Bustamante (born March 14, 1958) is a Colombian drug trafficker for the Norte del Valle Cartel, who was arrested in 2004 and, on July 19, 2007 transported for extradition to the United States on charges of money laundering and drug smuggling. Gomez, also known as "Rasguño" (English: Scratch) is reported to have received his nickname after dismissing the wound caused by being grazed in the cheek by a bullet as "just a scratch". He is currently incarcerated at Federal Correctional Institution, Mendota with a projected release date of 2032.

== Position and indictments ==
According to prosecutors, Gomez went from pumping gas in 1991 to declaring property worth more than half a million dollars a year later. According to U.S. federal prosecutors Gomez co-managed the Norte del Valle empire from 1990 to 2004. Between 1997 and 2004 he would be indicted in the United States three times in three different states. The first indictment issued in January 1997 in the Southern District of Virginia is on charges of Continuing Criminal Enterprise, conspiracy, firearms, and money laundering. On October 10, 2002, an indictment was issued in Eastern District of New York on charges of drug trafficking and money laundering. In March 2004, Washington D.C. indicted Gomez on drug trafficking and RICO charges. on March 11, 2004, Colombian police conducted raids against Gomez, stripping him of 68 farms, 24 offices and 17 parking lots as well as other items and properties, a total worth listed at over 100 million.

Gomez has since admitted to managing the payroll and operations of 800 of the cartel's 6,000 workers, including several members of the Colombian Congress and also eight town mayors. His accumulated wealth at the time of extradition included such luxuries as a Ferrari and two paintings claimed to be originals of Baroque master Peter Paul Rubens.

== Capture and extradition ==
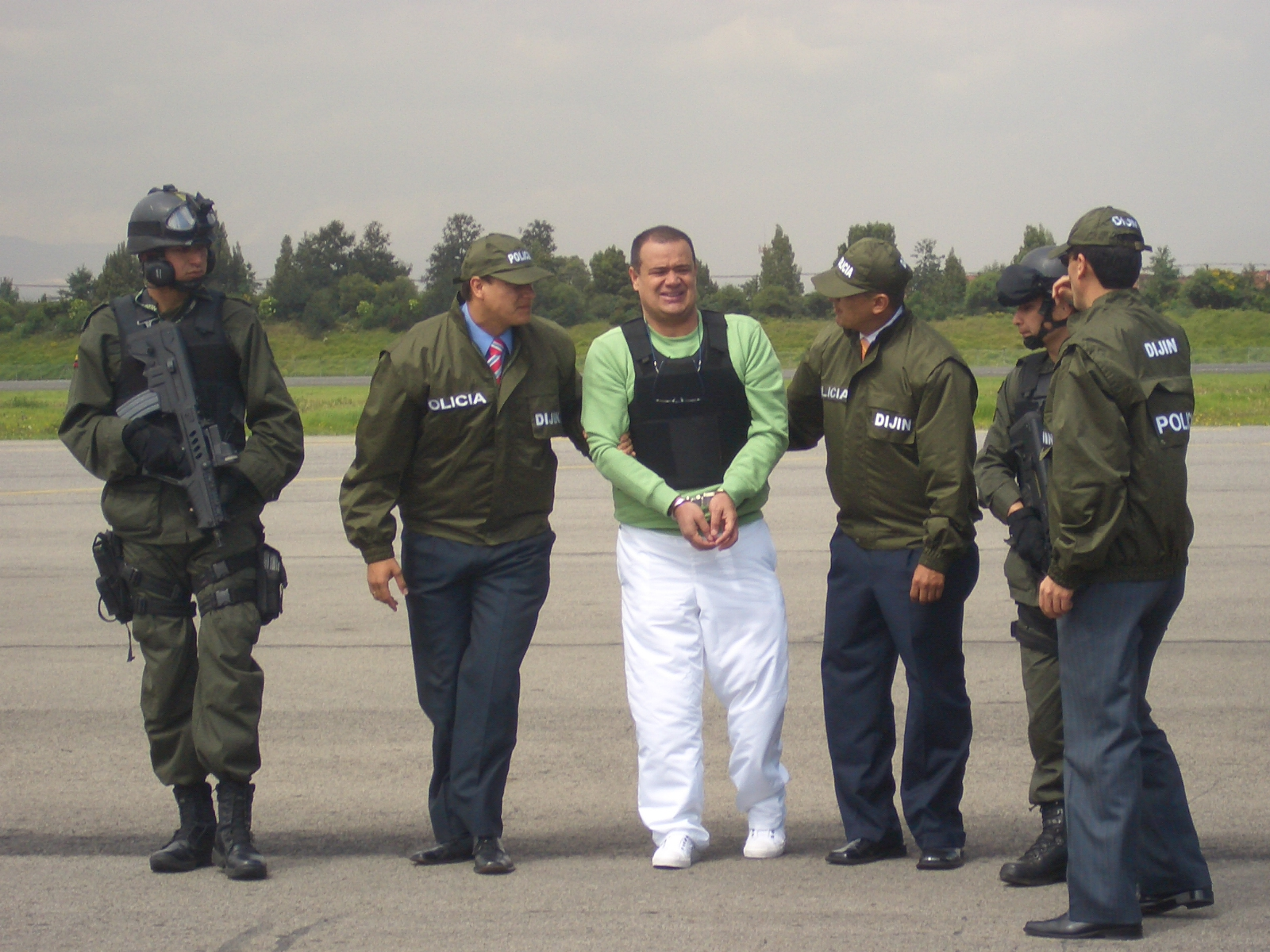
Luis Hernando Gómez arrest performed by the National Police of Colombia

On July 2, 2004, Gomez was captured as he stepped off a plane in at the José Martí International Airport in Havana on immigration charges. Gomez was attempting to enter Cuba with a falsified passport. It is believed that Gomez was fleeing the 5-million-dollar reward for his capture placed by the U.S. State Department, and possible extradition to the U.S. if captured. Due to tense relations between Cuba and the United States, Colombia was forced to act as an intermediary to secure the deportation and extradition of Gomez to the United States. On July 9, 2007, Gomez was deported from Cuba to Colombia.

Shortly before Gomez was extradited, he stated, in an interview for RCN TV, that he had shipped as much as 11 tons of cocaine in one night to the United States, the cocaine belonging to former United Self-Defense Forces of Colombia paramilitary leader Salvatore Mancuso. He further stated that the Cuban government attempted to have him implicated, with the Colombian President, Álvaro Uribe, offering at one point to release him if he did.

On July 19, 2007 the extradition procedure began with Colombian police transporting Gomez from the Cómbita maximum security prison to be handed over to agents of the U.S. Drug Enforcement Administration. Gomez was outfitted with a bulletproof vest as he was transported to the airport for extradition. The cited fear was an attempt on his life by other drug traffickers or corrupt politicians fearing what testimony he may give. It is believed his testimony and personal computer will show links to political officials and police as well as expose the Colombian cocaine trade and the Norte del Valle Cartel.

Gomez was believed to be happy for his extradition to the U.S. citing death threats from rival cartels since arriving in the Colombian prison system. The head of Colombia's judicial police, Col. Cesar Pinzon, who has called Gomez the "capo of capos", has verified that the prison authorities had received intelligence regarding assassination attempts and moved prisoners to prevent them from occurring.

== Trial ==
On October 18, 2008, Gomez pleaded guilty to racketeering charges in a Washington court. He also admitted sending over 500,000 kilograms of cocaine to America through Mexico between 1990 and 2004 as well as conspiracy to make and distribute more than 10,000 kilograms of cocaine destined for the US. Due to an extradition agreement between the United States and Colombia, Gomez cannot receive a life sentence, so prosecutors were instead looking for a multi-year prison sentence.

== Norte del Valle Cartel ==
The Norte del Valle Cartel is believed to have shipped 500 tons of cocaine since 1999 in relation to the 600 tons per year estimated to ship from all of Colombia, an estimated value of over 10 billion. Gomez and the cartel have paid right-wing paramilitary militias to protect smuggling routes. The cartel is believed to be the last in Colombia that managed the complete process from the cultivation of the coca to the production of cocaine and distribution. It is believed the cartel employs the use of aircraft, go-fast boats, and maritime cargo vessels to transport cocaine around the world. The cartel owns cocaine HCl conversion laboratories in the Valle del Cauca region of Colombia, and also has cocaine distribution cells in the New York / New Jersey area.

== Popular culture ==
- 'Rasguño' is portrayed by the Colombian actor Juan Carlos Arango as the character of 'Oswaldo Tovar a.k.a. Buñuelo' in TV Series El Cartel.
- The character of Braulio Bermúdez (portrayed by the colombian actor Fernando Solórzano) in TV Series The Mafia Dolls is inspired in Gómez-Bustamante.
- In TV series Tres Caínes is portrayed by Mauricio Cujar as the character of 'Raspón'.

== See also ==
- Cali Cartel
- Cuba-United States relations
- Medellín Cartel
- Narcotrafficking in Colombia
