= Andrés López López =

Former Colombian drug lord turned writer

- Born: June 15, 1971 (age 55); Cali, Colombia
- Other name: Florecita (Little Flower)
- Occupations: Writer, formerly drug trafficker
- Spouse: María del Socorro Patiño
- Children: 2
- Status: Free
- Criminal charges: Drug trafficking
- Penalty: 11 years, commuted to 20 months in prison

Andrés López López (15 June 1971) also known by the nickname 'Florecita' (English: Little Flower), is a former Colombian drug trafficker who was one of the leaders of the notorious Norte del Valle Cartel, and Colombian writer.

== Early years ==
López was born on 15 June 1971 in Cali, Colombia to a middle-class family. He started at the age of 15 in the drug laboratories of Valle del Cauca thanks to his best friend Fernando Henao "el Grillo" who introduced him to the business, since his older brother, Orlando Henao Montoya, was one of the bosses of the laboratories in the area at the service of the Cali Cartel.

Upon coming of age, Lopez was later nicknamed 'Florecita' ('Little Flower'), due to his sybaritic way of dressing, and in the early 1990s, he set up his own cocaine laboratory. In 1993, after the end of Pablo Escobar and the Medellin Cartel, Lopez became one of the creators of the Norte del Valle Cartel, following the split of the Cali Cartel, after rejecting the government's offer of surrender without expropriation of his assets. Lopez was a mid-level commander of the Norte del Valle Cartel and was known to be a peaceful man who only wanted to make money in the drug trafficking business. He later married former beauty queen María del Socorro Patiño, who had previously been reluctant to accept López's life of crime and with whom he had two children.

== Surrender ==
After the surrender of Orlando Henao to the Colombian authorities, López and Fernando Henao settled in Miami with their respective wives retired from the business. However, Henao continued to commit crimes while López occasionally helped some friends involved in drug trafficking, which led to his temporary separation from his wife. Due to the persistent persecution of the DEA and the cooperation with the authorities of the rival organizations, López decided to surrender to the US justice system in 2001 and was sentenced to 11 years in prison but only paid 20 months due to his collaboration with the American justice.

== Aftermath ==
After leaving prison, Lopez dedicated himself to revealing the secrets of drug trafficking through several published books, among which are 'El Cartel de los Sapos' (The Snitch Cartel) and Las Fantasticas (The Fantastic Girls), both taken to television by the librettist Juan Camilo Ferrand for Caracol Television. He resides with his family in Miami.

== In popular culture ==
- In 2008 Caracol TV produced the TV Series El cartel (inspired in Lopez' homonymous book), where López is portrayed by the Colombian actor Manolo Cardona as the character of Martín González 'Fresita' (Little Strawberry). Cardona reprises his role in film version The Snitch Cartel.
- His book Las Fantásticas (The Fantastic Girls) is adapted to TV series also by Caracol TV.

== Bibliography ==
- El cartel de los sapos (2008)
- Las fantásticas (2009)
- El cartel de los sapos 2 (2011)
- El señor de los cielos (2013)
- Joaquín El Chapo Guzmán: El varón de la droga (2015)
