= Juan Carlos Ramírez Abadía =

Colombian drug trafficker (born 1963)

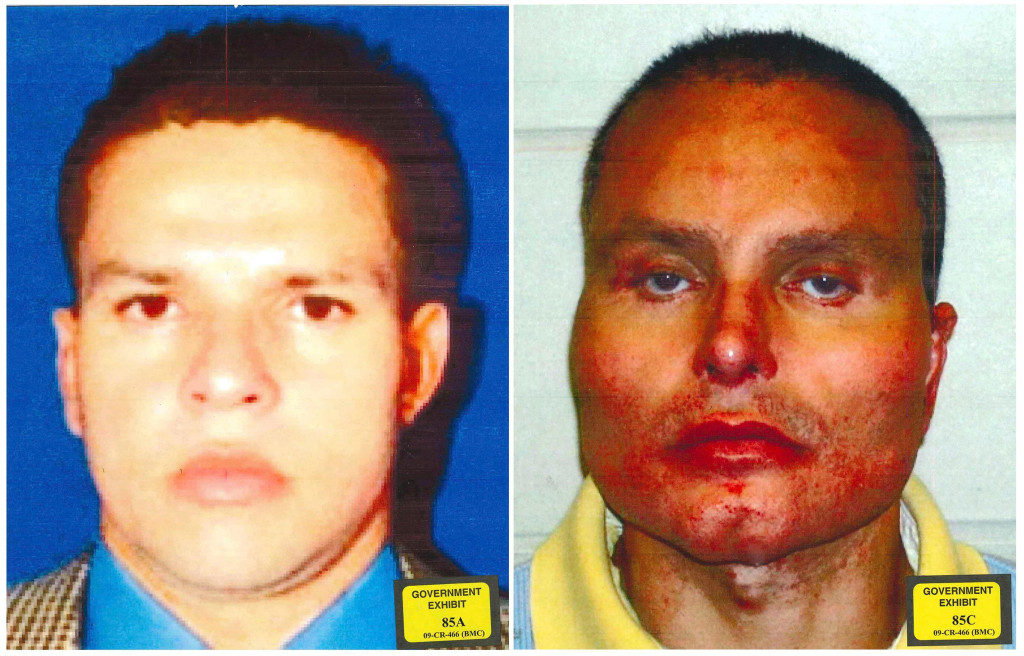
- "Chupeta" before and after surgery
- Born: February 16, 1963 (age 63); Palmira, Colombia
- Other names: Chupeta, Cien, Don Augusto, El Patron, Gustavo Ortiz, Charlie Pareja
- Spouse: Marlene Rodrigues Pinero
- Children: Daughters Verga Ramírez, Malina Pinero son Carlos Pinero
- Status: Arrested / Extradited
- Criminal charges: Drug trafficking and smuggling, racketeering, money laundering

Juan Carlos Ramírez Abadía (born February 16, 1963), also known as "Chupeta", is a drug trafficker who, until his capture, was one of the leaders of the North Valley Cartel (Norte del Valle Cartel), who was wanted on drug smuggling, murder and RICO charges in the United States of America. In addition to the trafficking of cocaine, it is believed Ramírez also participated in money laundering and trafficking of heroin. Through Ramírez’ illegal enterprise, he has amassed a fortune estimated at $1.8 billion by the US Department of State. He has been cited as "... one of the most powerful and most elusive drug traffickers in Colombia" by Adam J. Szubin, Director of the U.S. Department of the Treasury's Office of Foreign Assets Control (OFAC).

He served time in prison in Colombia from 1996 to 2002 after he had voluntarily surrendered to authorities. As a fugitive, he underwent several plastic surgeries to alter his appearance. On August 7, 2007, he was arrested in São Paulo, Brazil, in an exclusive area called Aldeia da Serra. He was sentenced to 30 years in prison in Brazil in April 2008. On March 13, 2008, the Supreme Federal Court of Brazil granted his extradition to the United States and he was extradited on August 22, 2008.

He pleaded guilty to murder and drug charges in 2010 and, as part of a plea deal, agreed to become a witness for the US government in return for a 25 year sentence. He testified at the 2018 trial of Joaquín "El Chapo" Guzmán, stating that he had been the main supplier of cocaine to El Chapo's Sinaloa cartel. When pressed by El Chapo's defense about his records of having paid for 150 murders-for-hire, he said he could not recall the exact number but admitted to several specific cases.

== Relations to Cali cartel ==
Ramírez served in the Colombian navy and then studied at the University of Miami in the 1980s. He is believed to have entered into drug trafficking in 1986 under the Cali Cartel, named after the area they operated out of, Cali Colombia, where it is believed Ramírez operated his drug trafficking empire. By the mid-1990s he was believed to have smuggled "multi-thousand kilograms of cocaine" yearly into San Antonio, Texas, and Los Angeles, California, through Mexico. Ramírez' operation is believed to rely on shipping containers and go-fast boats primarily, making use of routes along the Pacific Coast. Once the drugs arrive in their destination in the United States, it is then believed they are transported to New York City, where distribution cells controlled by Ramírez then sell the product. During the mid-1990s Ramírez was believed to be the youngest leader of the Cali cartel.

Ramírez surrendered in March 1996 to Colombian officials and was sentenced to 24 years in prison. It is believed he surrendered due to a fear for his personal safety and to be eligible for a more lenient prison sentence. Prior to his arrest, it is estimated he had smuggled a total of twenty metric tons of cocaine. The United States Department of State believes Ramírez continued his operation and control over smuggling throughout his time in prison, and continued upon his early release in 2002. In 2003, the US State Department believes Ramírez expanded his operation and began smuggling heroin into the US through ships. It is also believed Ramírez began to associate himself with the Norte del Valle cartel upon his release from prison.

== Law enforcement actions ==
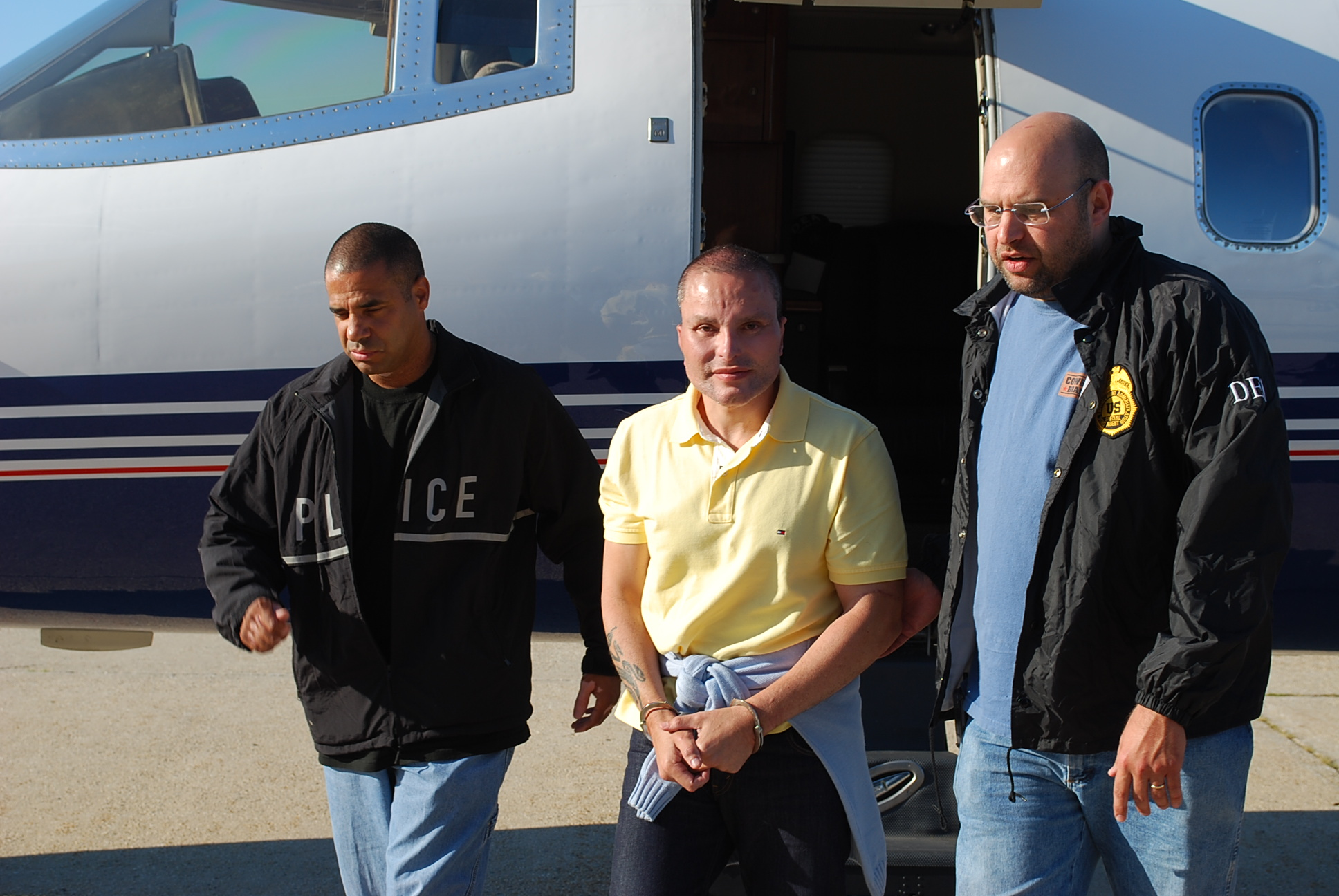
Juan Carlos Ramirez Abadia, escorted by two DEA agents after being extradited from Brazil

In November 1994, Ramírez was indicted in the District of Colorado, in 2004 in the Eastern District of New York and, again indicted in 2006 in Eastern District of New York. Between state indictments a federal jury in March, 2004 brought forth a federal indictment on RICO charges, for his leadership in the Norte del Valle cartel, and drug trafficking. Requests from the Department of State to Colombia for the extradition of Ramírez were denied. A provisional arrest warrant was issued and sent to the U.S. Embassy in Bogotá, as well as a 5 million dollar bounty placed on Abadia for his arrest.

In August 2000 the U.S. Department of Treasury Office of Foreign Assets Control (OFAC) declared Ramírez a "Specially Designated Narcotics Trafficker," allowing the seizure of funds connected to, or stemming from his illegal activities. The OFAC announced on August 29, 2006, the seizure of assets from two companies related to Ramírez, a pharmaceutical distribution company, Disdrogas Ltda. and a Colombian holdings company, Ramirez Abadia y Cia. S.C.S. Disdrogas Ltda., originally named Ramirez y Cia. Ltda', was operated by Ramírez' parents Omar Ramírez Ponce and Carmen Alicia Abadía Bastidas, and his business associates Jorge Rodrigo Salinas Cuevas and Edgar Marino Otalora Restrepo. The now defunct Ramirez Abadia y Cia. S.C.S was believed to be used to hold real estate and other assets for Ramírez.

In January 2007, Colombian officials stepped up efforts to combat the drug cartels in a series of raids targeting their financial holdings. In a one-week period Colombian officials discovered over $54 million in cash and gold ingots, hidden in buildings in the south-eastern portion of Cali. The stash of money and gold was located in vacuum sealed plastic bags inside locked steel chambers covered in concrete which was tiled over. The residents of the houses were arrested and taken into custody. The $54 million was only a small portion of the estimated $1.8 billion fortune.

On August 7, 2007, Ramírez was arrested with his private pilot Candido.Norberto.G.Portella/Caiado in Aldeia da Serra, a wealthy neighborhood of Barueri, state of São Paulo, by Brazilian Federal Police during a raid. An auction of his belongings following his arrest led to an enormous queue of Brazilians trying to get their hands on one of the drug lord's goods.

On March 13, 2008, the Supreme Federal Court of Brazil granted his extradition to the United States and he was extradited on August 22, 2008.

== Cooperation with U.S. law enforcement ==
According to a federal sentencing document, Ramirez began cooperating with agents while in custody in Brazil awaiting extradition to the United States. He surrendered ledgers, millions of dollars in drug proceeds, properties, weapons, and he urged other co-conspirators to surrender. While incarcerated in Brazil, Ramirez learned of a plot to kidnap one of Luiz Inácio Lula da Silva's children for extortion, and helped halt the effort.

Ramirez pleaded guilty to murder and drug charges in 2010 and, as part of a plea deal, agreed to become a witness for the US government in return for a 25 year sentence. Prosecutors credited him with information used to indict Jesus Zambada Garcia, Héctor Beltrán Leyva, and Joaquín "El Chapo" Guzmán. Prosecutors have suggested that knowledge of Ramirez's defection led to the guilty plea of Alfredo Beltrán Leyva. Prosecutors also credit Ramirez with providing intelligence about Colombian paramilitaries, corrupt government officials in Colombia and Mexico, and narcotics traffickers who are alleged to have murdered witnesses that have cooperated with the government.

He testified at the 2018 trial of Joaquín "El Chapo" Guzmán, stating that he had been the main supplier of cocaine to El Chapo's Sinaloa cartel. When pressed by El Chapo's defense about his records of having paid for 150 murders-for-hire, he said he could not recall the exact number but admitted to several specific cases.

In May 2022, federal prosecutors acknowledged that Ramirez had provided useful cooperation and requested his sentencing judge to honor the deal for a sentence of 25 years.

== Popular culture ==
- 'Chupeta' is portrayed by the Colombian actor Juan Pablo Raba in the TV series El Cartel as the character of John Mario Martinez 'Pirulito' and in the second season is portrayed by the Colombian actor Camilo Saenz playing a 'Pirulito' captured in Brazil after several plastic surgeries. In the film El Cartel de los Sapos, Raba reprised his role.
- In TV series Tres Caínes is portrayed by Luis Fernando Salas as the character of 'Chuleta'.

== See also ==
- Cali Cartel
- Cocaine
- Narcotrafficking in Colombia
- Norte del Valle Cartel
- Medellín Cartel
