= Victor Patiño-Fomeque =

Colombian drug trafficker

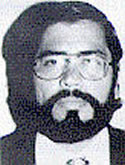
Victor Patiño Fomeque

Victor Julio Patiño Fomeque (born January 31, 1959) is a Colombian narcotrafficker member of the Cali Cartel and Norte del Valle Cartel, currently active again in the narcotics trade after serving six years in prison in the United States. Patiño was responsible for ensuring the security and effectiveness of the Cali Cartel's maritime operations of drug shipments. He surrendered to Colombian authorities on June 24, 1995, and was sentenced to 12 years' in prison.

== Biography ==
Patiño was once a Colombian policeman and was recruited later by Gilberto and Miguel Rodríguez Orejuela, leaders of the Cali Cartel, to be their bodyguard.

On October 7, 2005, Patiño and his mother testified in the United States and accused a prominent Colombian politician named Vicente Blel of being one of his major nominees. According to Patiño, Blel met him under a fake name, Julio Gómez, to disguise his relation to the Cali Cartel and also said that he was a businessman from Cali willing to collaborate in the presidential campaign of Ernesto Samper. Patiño was also personally introduced to Horacio Serpa, Samper's chief of debate back then. Blel responded that he indeed had met with Patiño, thinking it was in fact Gomez, the businessman, and had collaborated with him several times, even helping him to put properties under his name and with numerous other favors. Patiño and other members of the Cali Cartel used corruption as a way to protect their drug business.

However, since he decided to testify in the United States, he saw at least 35 family members and friends slaughtered in retaliation for his betrayal. Patiño was to be released on June 28, 2010, after serving six years in the U.S. prison system. The DEA decided it was best for Patiño to return to Colombia, since it would not be fair for the U.S. government to protect a criminal of his stature. Upon his return to Colombia, Patiño faces several homicide and extortion cases against him.

== Popular culture ==
- Is portrayed by the colombian actor Waldo Urrego as the character of Fermín Urrego 'El Tigre' in TV Series El cartel.
