= Norte del Valle Cartel =

Colombian drug cartel

- Los Norteños
- Years active: 1985 – 2008
- Territory: Northern Valle del Cauca department of Colombia
- Ethnicity: Colombian
- Leaders: Orlando Henao Montoya; Iván Urdinola
- Activities: Drug trafficking, murder, money laundering, gun-running and human trafficking
- Allies: Sinaloa Cartel
- Rivals: Cali Cartel (defunct)

The Norte del Valle Cartel (Spanish: Cártel del Norte del Valle), or North Valley Cartel, was a drug cartel that operated principally in the north of the Valle del Cauca department of Colombia, most notably the coastal city of Buenaventura. It rose to prominence during the 1990s, after the Cali and Medellín Cartels fragmented, and it was known as one of the most powerful organizations in the illegal drug trade. The drug cartel was led by the brothers Luis Enrique and Javier Antonio Calle Serna, alias "Los Comba", until its takedown in 2008 by the authorities of Colombia and Venezuela, with cooperation of the United States DEA.

== History ==
According to drug trafficker Hernando Gómez Bustamante 'Rasguño', the cartel was created by Gerardo Martínez 'Drácula' who began his first fortune with marijuana trafficking in Santa Marta in the late 70s and was finally murdered in 1978.

In his book El Cartel de los Sapos, Andrés López López 'Florecita' stated that the Norte del Valle cartel was formed after an event where the brothers Miguel Rodríguez Orejuela and Gilberto Rodríguez Orejuela, leaders of the Cali Cartel, came to an agreement with the Colombian government that if they surrendered themselves and their organization to the Colombian justice system they would be given perks, such as imprisonment in Colombian prisons for not more than five years and the promise of no expropriation of their money and substantial assets. It is stated that they organized a meeting with their lieutenants, main subordinates, and junior partners in the business, to inform them that the decision had already been taken to stop all the illicit business immediately. Those members who refused this sudden dissolution, including Carlos Alberto Rentería Mantilla, Juan Carlos Ortiz Escobar, Juan Carlos Ramírez Abadía, Diego León Montoya Sánchez, and leaded by Orlando Henao Montoya, formed the North Valley cartel.

== Known members ==
Its members were José Orlando Henao Montoya alias El Hombre del Overol (The Overall Man), Colonel Danilo Gonzalez, Ivan Urdinola Grajales Alias El Enano (The Dwarf) Efrain Hernandez Ramirez Don Efra (Mr. Efra), Andres Lopez Lopez Florecita (Floweret); Arcangel de Jesus Henao Montoya El Mocho, middle brother of Orlando Henao, Lorena Henao Montoya La Viuda De La Mafia (The Mafia Widow) sister of Orlando Henao, Wilber Alirio Varela Fajardo, Jabón [or Cabo](Soap), Diego León Montoya Sanchez Don Diego (Mr. Diego), Juan Carlos Ramirez Abadia Chupeta (Lollipop), C.N.G.P "El Piloto" Luis Hernando Gomez Bustamante Rasguño (Scratch), Victor Patiño Fomeque El Quimico (The Chemist) or La Fiera (The Beast). Ex member of Cali Cartel, Luis Alfonso Ocampo Fomeque Tocayo (Namesake) half brother of Victor Patiño, Carlos Alberto Renteria Mantilla Beto Renteria, Ramon Alberto Quintero Sanclemente RQ, Miguel Fernando Solano Don Miguelito (Mr. Miguelito) Juan Carlos Ortiz Escobar Cuchilla (Blade) and Jorge Eliecer Asprilla El Negro Asprilla, Peter Belt (Pedro Bacos).

== Activities ==
According to Diego Montoya's Federal Bureau of Investigation (FBI) profile, the U.S. government accuses him of being involved in the willing production and distribution of multiple tons of cocaine into the United States. It also considers him and his organization as heavily relying on violence enjoying the protection of both right-wing and left-wing illegal armed groups classified as terrorist organizations by the U.S. government.

According to a 2004 U.S. government Racketeer Influenced and Corrupt Organizations Act (RICO) indictment, between 1990 and 2004, the Norte del Valle cartel exported more than 1.2 million pounds – or 500 metric tons – of cocaine worth in excess of $10 billion from Colombia to Mexico and ultimately to the United States for resale.

The indictment charges that the Norte del Valle cartel used violence and brutality to further its goals, including the murder of rivals, individuals who failed to pay for cocaine, and associates who were believed to be working as informants.

The indictment alleges that the cartel members employed the services of the United Self-Defense Forces of Colombia (AUC), a right-wing paramilitary organization internationally classified as terrorist, to protect the cartel's drug routes, its drug laboratories, and its members and associates. The AUC is one of the 37 Foreign Terrorist Organizations identified by the U.S. State Department in 2004.

Leaders of the Norte del Valle cartel allegedly bribed and corrupted Colombian law enforcement and Colombian legislators to, among other things, attempt to block the extradition of Colombian narcotics traffickers to the United States to be prosecuted for their crimes. According to the indictment, members of the Norte del Valle cartel even conducted their own wiretaps in Colombia to intercept the communications of rival drug traffickers and Colombian and United States law enforcement officials.

== Changes in leadership ==
The chiefs of the Norte del Valle cartel at one time included Orlando Henao a.k.a. "el hombre del overol" ("The overall man"), Montìguéz Franco a.k.a. "Monty", Diego León Montoya Sánchez, a.k.a. "Don Diego", Wilber Varela, a.k.a. "Jabón" ("Soap"), and Juan Carlos Ramírez Abadía, a.k.a. "Chupeta" ("Lollipop"). Until his capture in late 2007 Diego Montoya was part of the list containing the FBI's Ten Most Wanted Fugitives.

Fierce rivalries that divided the cartel into warring factions erupted in 2003 when Hernando Gómez, Wilber Varela and their inner circle, prompted by a rising number of extradition of cartel members to the United States, apparently attempted to negotiate a possible surrender deal with the Drug Enforcement Administration (DEA), in a move which was strongly rejected by Diego Montoya and several of the other cartel drug lords. After a failed hit on Varela left him in the hospital with multiple gunshots, Varela declared war on Diego Montoya who he held responsible for the attack.

This situation led to brutal gang warfare, which left a deathtoll of more than 1,000 people between 2003 and 2004 throughout different northern locations of the Valle del Cauca department.

The consequences of such an internal vendetta led Colombian authorities to intervene in order to increase law enforcement efforts against the cartel, which resulted in the 2004 arrest of some 100 assassins in the employ of both rival factions, and in the 2005 capture of Varela's close associate Julio César López (alias "Ojitos", or "Small Eyes"), and Montoya's chief hatchetman, Carlos José Robayo Escobar (alias "Guacamayo", or "Macaw"), among others. On June 4, 2008, Julio César López was sentenced to 45 years in federal prison by a federal court in New York. More than $100 million worth in properties and luxury assets was also seized, along with an almost complete fiberglass narco-submarine that would have been built by the cartel in order to smuggle drugs into the United States and other foreign countries.

All of these events may have influenced several members of the Norte del Valle cartel to seek a deal with Colombian and U.S. drug enforcement authorities during late 2004 and early 2005, whether through direct negotiation proposals or employing the possible protection that they may gain through the infiltration of the AUC's then ongoing peace negotiations with the Colombian government.

Diego Montoya was captured in Colombia on September 10, 2007. Wilber Varela was killed in the Venezuelan city of Mérida.

== Cartel arrests ==
The Norte del Valle Cartel is believed to have been the single most powerful existing cartel in Colombia with exception of the smaller North Coast Cartel, the FARC Marxist guerrilla, and the right wing paramilitary group AUC. Due to their violent warfare that left more than 1,000 people dead between 2003 and 2004, the Colombian government with support of the Drug Enforcement Administration (DEA), FBI, and U.S. Immigration and Customs Enforcement have pursued the cartel heavily for over four years.

=== 2003–2004 ===
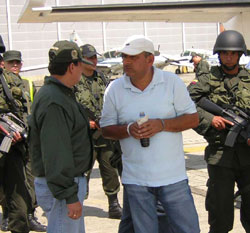
José Dagoberto Flores Ríos

The first significant blow to be dealt to the Norte del Valle Cartels internal membership came with the arrest of Juan Carlos Montoya Sánchez, brother to top Norte del Valle boss Diego Montoya. Juan Carlos was arrested in December 2003 in Colombia and extradited to the United States two years later on May 4, 2005, where he was sentenced to 262 months in prison for drug trafficking and money laundering. He was believed to be responsible for overseeing the cartel's cocaine laboratories. Along with Juan Carlos, Carlos Felipe Toro Sánchez, alias "Pipe", was arrested. Carlos Felipe was believed to be responsible for overseeing the drug shipments of cocaine to their destination in the U.S., Mexico, and Europe. Carlos Felipe was extradited to the United States ten days before Juan Carlos, on April 25, 2005. The following month after the capture of Juan Carlos came the arrest of José Dagoberto Flores Ríos whose alias is "Chuma." Jose Dagoberto, who was the top lieutenant to Arcángel Henao Montoya, was arrested in January 2004 in Colombia and later extradited to the United States where he is in custody in New York.

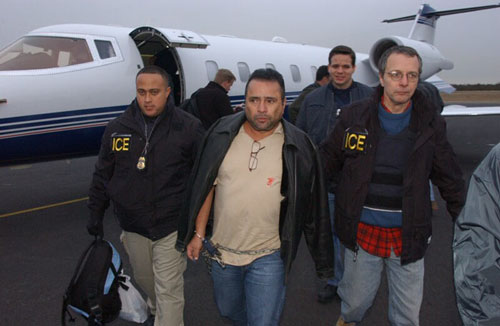
Arcángel De Jesús Henao Montoya: alias "El Mocho" being escorted by ICE agents.

In 2004, four additional captures occurred of Norte del Valle hierarchy. The capture of Arcángel Henao Montoya, also known as "El Mocho" ("The Amputee"), was a top leader of the cartel. Arcángel was arrested on January 10, 2004, in Panama and extradited to New York. In July 2004 Luis Hernando Gómez Bustamante, alias "Rasguño" ("Scratch"), one of the founders and top leaders of the cartel, was arrested on July 2, 2004, trying to enter Cuba on a false passport. He was held in Cuba awaiting extradition to Colombia and ultimately to the U.S. In March 2004, the Colombian government seized properties belonging to Bustamante in excess of $100 million. He would not be extradited to the United States for over three years. Gabriel Puerta Parra, alias "El Doctor" ("The Doctor"), was arrested on October 7, 2004, near Bogotá, Colombia. Gabriel Puerta was an attorney and counselor to the Norte del Valle cartel. He acted as a highly respected intermediary between the Norte del Valle Cartel and major Mexican cartels, assisted in resolving disputes within the cartel and, influencing the Colombian government with extradition matters. He invested his own money in drug shipments and facilitated money laundering operations through front companies he owned and setup for the cartel, as well as acquiring local and international real estate to launder the cartel's illegal proceeds.

=== 2005–2006 ===
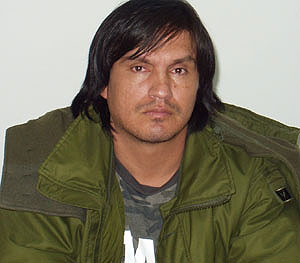
Jhonny Cano Correa

Arrests continued throughout 2005 as José Aldemar Rendón Ramírez, alias "Mechas", was arrested by Colombian authorities on July 15, 2005. José Aldemar operated as a financial officer within the Norte del Valle Cartel, responsible for the launder of its illegal proceeds. Jhonny Cano Correa, alias "Flecha" ("Arrow"), was arrested later the year on October 29, 2005. Jhonny Cano operated as a chief of security for Luis Hernando Gómez Bustamante. He was responsible for ensuring the security of cocaine processing laboratories, drug shipments, and murdering rivals. He was eventually extradited to the United States in September 2006.

Following the capture of Luis Hernando Gómez Bustamante, and his chief of security, Jhonny Cano, came the capture of Bustamante's lieutenant, Jaime Maya Durán, alias "Alejandro". Following Bustamante's arrest, Durán assumed more responsibility within the cartel. He was captured in Mexico in September 2006 and shortly after extradited to the United States. The following month brought the capture of Orlando Sabogal Zuluaga, alias "Alberto", another high-ranking lieutenant to Luis Hernando Gómez Bustamante on October 31, 2006, in a shopping mall in Spain.

=== 2007 ===
In 2007 five members of the cartel were captured, Eugenio Montoya Sánchez, alias "Don Hugo", younger brother to top cartel boss Diego Montoya, was arrested January 15, 2007, in the Cartel's stronghold town of El Dovio. It is believed Eugenio took over his brother's major operations to allow his brother to remain at large from Colombian and U.S. authorities.

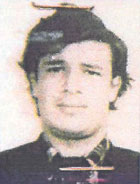
Luis Gómez a.k.a. "Rasguño" (scratch)

February 2007 brought about the extradition of Luis Hernando Gómez Bustamante, arrested years prior. Bustamante was extradited to Colombia from Cuba on July 20, 2007, he was then handed over to DEA agents in Bogotá for transport to the United States. Bustamante reportedly offered to cooperate with U.S. authorities in exchange for protection after receiving numerous death threats while in Colombian custody. February led to the capture of Laureano Rentería, Alessandro Racca Caiado [El Piloto] of Juan Carlos Ramírez Abadía. Laureano Renteria was detained in one of Ramirez's hiding places containing $19 million. He tried convincing authorities he was a simple construction worker hired to remodel the house and accepted a plea deal to 44 months in prison. While in prison an informant in New York revealed he was Ramírez's confidant who protected Ramirez during their six-year prison term served in a Colombia during the 1990s. Laureano Renteria was responsible for managing Ramírez's financial structure including the stash house logistics and bribing of high Colombian government officials. When the DEA learned of this information they had the Colombian authorities transfer Rentería to a maximum security prison to await a speedy extradition to the US. On February 27, 2007, the extradition order was to be served, but authorities found Rentería dead in his cell due to cyanide poisoning. His death went unsolved, but Ramírez is suspected to have ordered the hit to prevent him from revealing vital cartel secrets.

On February 25, 2007, Eduardo Restrepo Victoria, also known as "El Socio", was arrested in Colombia. It is believed that Eduardo is the right-hand man and the partner of the cartel leader, Wilber Varela. On September 7, 2006, Colombian police seized 65 Restrepo properties in the cities of Bogota, Cali and no state of Tolima valued at more than US$25 million. Henry Loaiza Ceballos, "El Alacran" ("The Scorpion"). When he was captured and extradited, Restrepo assumed its operations in partnership with Varela.[23] The month following the capture of Juan Carlos Ramirez-Abadia, incidentally "Chupeta", one of the main masters of Cartel Norte del Valle. In January 2007, four separate raids of Ramírez's houses in the city of Cali, Colombia. Ramirez was arrested in Brazil on August 7, 2007.[24] Ramirez was extradited by Brazil to the United States on Friday, August 22, 2008. Diego León Montoya Sánchez, alias "Don Diego", "El Señor de la Guerra" ("The Warlord"), was arrested on September 10, 2007, at 8:20 a.m., in a rural farm house in Valle, Colombia. Montoya was believed to be the top leader of the Norte Del Valle Cartel. The arrest of Diego Leon ends the Montoya Clan's claim in drug trafficking, with Juan Carlos Montoya Sánchez serving a 262-month prison term in the United States and his younger brother Eugenio Montoya Sánchez detained in a maximum security prison in Colombia awaiting extradition. After news of Montoya's arrest, Colombian Defense Minister claimed his extradition to the US was inevitable. He was extradited to Miami on December 12, 2008.

=== 2008 ===
The Colombian and US governments were targeting Wilber Varela, believing he would try to take over Montoya's business as well and possibly start another war with the emerging leaders. However, Varela was found murdered on January 30, 2008, in a hotel resort in the city of Mérida in Venezuela. Colombian authorities believe he was murdered by his own men on orders of jailed paramilitary drug lord Carlos Mario Jimenez alias "Macaco" to end Varela's power struggle in the rival city Medellin and surrounding areas in Antioquia. Jimenez was later extradited to the United States on May 7, 2008, for failing to meet the terms of his surrender and for continuing to run his criminal organization in prison.

=== 2009–2010 ===
On June 1, 2009, Aldemar Álvarez Tabares alias "Pelón", the supposed successor of Bustamante, was arrested in Cali. Ramón Quintero Sanclemente (alias "RQ" or "Lucas"), an old guard high-ranking member of the cartel, was arrested in Quito (Ecuador) and immediately deported to Colombia. Quintero was held in the Combita maximum security prison, while awaiting extradition proceedings to the United States. Quintero was one of the 10 most wanted DEA drug traffickers in the world, and he had a reward for his capture, valued up to $5 million. Quintero was accused of being one of the last leaders of the NVC organization, and also of trafficking large amounts of cocaine through Mexico using his Mexican cartel connections / partners (some reports claim that his organization was moving up to 50 metric tons per year to the United States and Europe). The formal request for extradition was submitted by the United States in July 2009. The case was prosecuted by Assistant U.S. Attorneys Bonnie S. Klapper and Walter M. Norkin in the Eastern District of New York. Colombia's Supreme Court approved Quintero's extradition on June 28, 2011. He was extradited on December 12, 2011. On November 21, 2012, South Florida judge William P. Dimitrouleas sentenced Quintero to 210 months (17 years) in federal prison on charges of conspiring to import cocaine to the United States.

== Future ==
Diego Montoya's arrest and Wilber Varela's murder closed a chapter in Colombia's war on drugs. However, Colombian and US officials have identified the remaining cartel members that may fight for leadership of the organization. Authorities have identified the following targets as possible successors for both the Montoya and Varela Organization. As a preventive initiative, the Colombian government has issued arrest warrants for all these men before they can organize and restructure the cartel. Close to $250,000 is being offered for information leading to the arrest of each suspect. All suspects have extradition requests from the United States.

=== Los Machos (Diego Montoya Organization) ===
Los Machos was a Colombian drug trafficking paramilitary organization. The group started as Montoya's security force. Oscar Varela Garcia alias "Capachivo" is posed as the most likely candidate to assume leadership. Fifty-four-year-old Varela, along with the Robayo brothers, has control of Montoya's security force of Los Machos. Varela started his career as a hitman with Wilber Varela for the late drug baron Orlando Henao Montoya. Varela remained friends with Wilber Varela until he sided with Montoya during the Montoya-Varela war. Oscar Varela's name became known after he organized the Jamundí massacre, where ten investigative agents were murdered by a corrupt military unit. On July 5, 2008, Varela was captured by Colombian authorities in a farmhouse in Palmira, Valle del Cauca. The operation was during the early morning where Varela was captured while he was sleeping in his underwear with his girlfriend.

Jorge Urdinola Perea alias "La Iguana" ("The Iguana") is another potential candidate. Urdinola is 42 years old and is cousin to the late drug baron Ivan Urdinola Grajales. He owns and operates many drug laboratories in the cartel's stronghold of the Canon Of Garrapatas and in the Colombian state of Choco. He is also the current leader of Diego Montoya's private army and hit squad "Los Machos". If Urdinola assumes control, his brother Hilbert Urdinola Perea alias "Don H" (Mr. H), will also co-lead. On June 25, 2008, Jorge Urdinola Perea was captured by Colombian authorities in Zarzal, Valle del Cauca.

The fourth possible candidate was 39-year-old Gildardo Rodriguez Herrera alias "El Señor de la Camisa" ("The Man of the Shirt"). He started his career as a leftist guerrilla and after spending ten years at Montoya's side he learned the trade. He also managed Montoya's security forces of Los Machos. After Montoya's arrest, Gildardo was starting to gain strength until Colombian authorities captured him on May 16, 2008, in a farmhouse in the Colombian state of Cundinamarca. The arrest was made possible on information provided by an informant who was paid the reward money.

=== Los Rastrojos (Wilber Varela Organization) ===
Los Rastrojos is a Colombian drug trafficking paramilitary organization. The group was formed by Norte del Valle cartel capo Wilber Varela, alias "Jabon" and one of his right-hand men, "Diego Rastrojo", around 2004 when Varela fell out with fellow-capo Diego Leon Montoya, alias "Don Diego". The group became independent after the murder of its main founder in Venezuela in 2008 and has since become one of the most important drug trafficking organization in Colombia.

Authorities now believe Wilber Varela's main captains Diego Perez Henao alias "Diego Rastrojo" and Luis Enrique Calle alias "Combatiente" ("Combatant") conspired with AUC commander Carlos Mario Jiménez alias "Macaco" to murder Varela. With the murder of Varela, Jimenez consolidated himself as the maximum authority in drug trafficking in Colombia controlling the drug trade in ten Colombian states and having authority over the cartel. His control lasted until his extradition in 2008. Luis Enrique Calle's rise to power will include his brother Javier Antonio Calle. Together they operated Varela's drug laboratories and oversaw transportation through their controlled drug routes. Under Jimenez's conditions, the Varela organization was to leave any interests in Medellin and Antioquia and share power between Henao and the Calle brothers.

Other Varela organization members of interest include Gilmer Humberto Quintero, alias "Cabezon" ("Big Head"), Ramon Quintero Sanclemente alias "Lucas" (arrested in Ecuador in April 2010, deported to Colombia for extradition proceedings to the United States), Jaime Umberto Palomino alias "Piernas Locas" ("Crazy Legs"), Roberto Londono Velez, Jaime Alberto Marin Zamora alias "Beto", Jose Ignacio Bedoya Velez, and Diego Perez Henao's brother Wilmar Perez Henao. Longtime Varela partner Ramon Quintero is suspected of being the most powerful and experienced target but is suspected of being at war with Diego Perez Henao over a 10 million dollar dispute.

Gilmer Humberto Quintero was found dead inside a police station bathroom with a shot in the head. Apparently, he committed suicide with a .25 caliber pistol he had hidden from police when he was captured June 14, 2008.

=== North Valley remnants (Ramirez Abadía Organization) ===
After Laureano Renteria's mysterious murder in his jail cell and the capture of Juan Carlos Ramírez Abadía in Brazil, authorities identified Aldemar Rojas Mosquera as the most likely inheritor of Ramirez's organization.

== See also ==
- Cali Cartel
- El cartel (TV series)
- Illegal drug trade in Colombia
- Medellín Cartel
- Perp walk
- The Snitch Cartel
