= Illegal drug trade in Colombia =

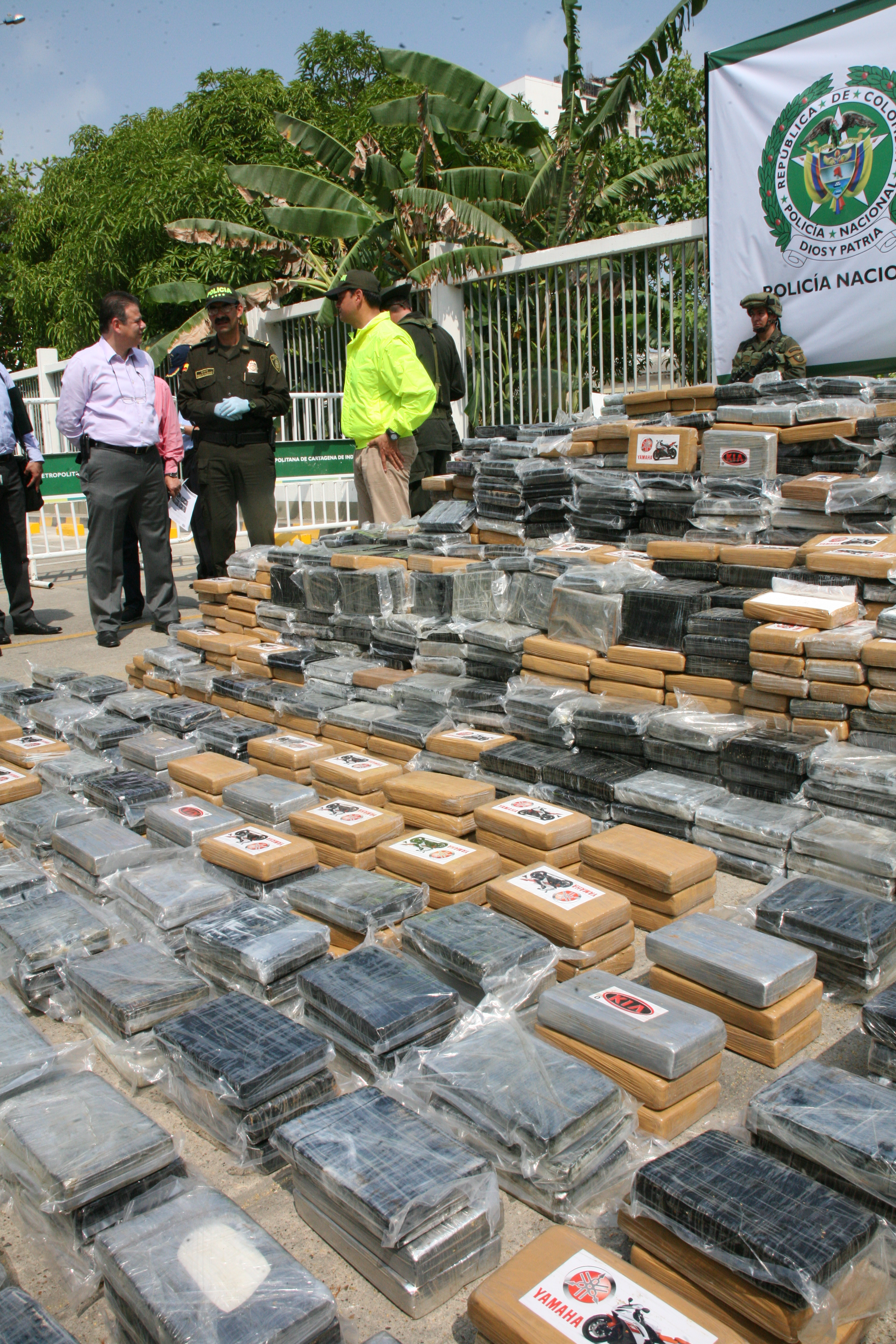
Stacks of cocaine seized by the National Police of Colombia.

The illegal drug trade in Colombia has, since the 1970s, centered successively on four major drug trafficking cartels: Medellín, Cali, Norte del Valle, and North Coast, as well as several bandas criminales, or BACRIMs. The trade eventually created a new social class and influenced several aspects of Colombian culture, economics, and politics.

The Colombian government efforts to reduce the influence of drug-related criminal organizations is one of the origins of the Colombian conflict, an ongoing low-intensity war among rival narcoparamilitary groups, guerrillas and drug cartels fighting each other to increase their influence and against the Colombian government that struggles to stop them.

== Overview ==
Colombia is known for being the world's-leading producer of coca for many years. Worldwide demand for psychoactive drugs during the 1960s and 1970s resulted in increased production and processing of the plant in Colombia. Cocaine produced at $1,500/kilo in jungle labs can be sold on the streets of the US for as much as $50,000/kilo. The US, the world's largest consumer of cocaine and other illegal drugs, intervened in Colombia throughout this period in an attempt to cut off the supply of these drugs to the US. The drug barons of Colombia, such as Pablo Escobar and José Rodríguez Gacha, were long considered by authorities to be among the most dangerous, wealthy, and powerful men in the world.

Since the establishment of the war on drugs, the United States and European countries have provided financial, logistical, tactical and military aid to the government of Colombia in order to implement plans to combat the illegal drug trade. The most notable of these programs has been the Plan Colombia which also intended to combat leftist organizations, such as the FARC guerrillas, who have controlled many coca-growing regions in Colombia over the past decades. In 2010, cocaine production was 60% lower than at its peak in 2000. In that same year, Peru surpassed Colombia as the main producer of coca leaves in the world. The level of drug-related violence was halved in the last 10 years and dropped below that of countries like Honduras, El Salvador, Venezuela, Guatemala and Trinidad and Tobago.

One of Colombia's efforts to combat this problem was signing the 1988 Vienna Convention Against Illicit Traffic in Narcotic Drugs and Psychotropic Substances, and including chemicals and drug precursors in the list. This was a stronger response than seen globally as those substances are freely traded in the rest of the world. The actual consumption of the drug in Colombia is smaller than in the United States despite internal production being based in the country.

Given the fact that the population of the United States is the largest user of illegal drugs in the world, with one in six citizens claiming to have used cocaine in their life, the United Nations Office on Drugs and Crime (UNODC), after reviewing the efficiency of the actions taken by the Colombian government for more than 20 years, has called for cocaine consuming countries - mostly in Europe and North America - to take their share of responsibility and reduce demand for cocaine, explaining that there are limits to what the Andean governments can do if cocaine consumption continues unabated, a position that has been maintained by the Colombian government for many years and was later accepted by the United States government.

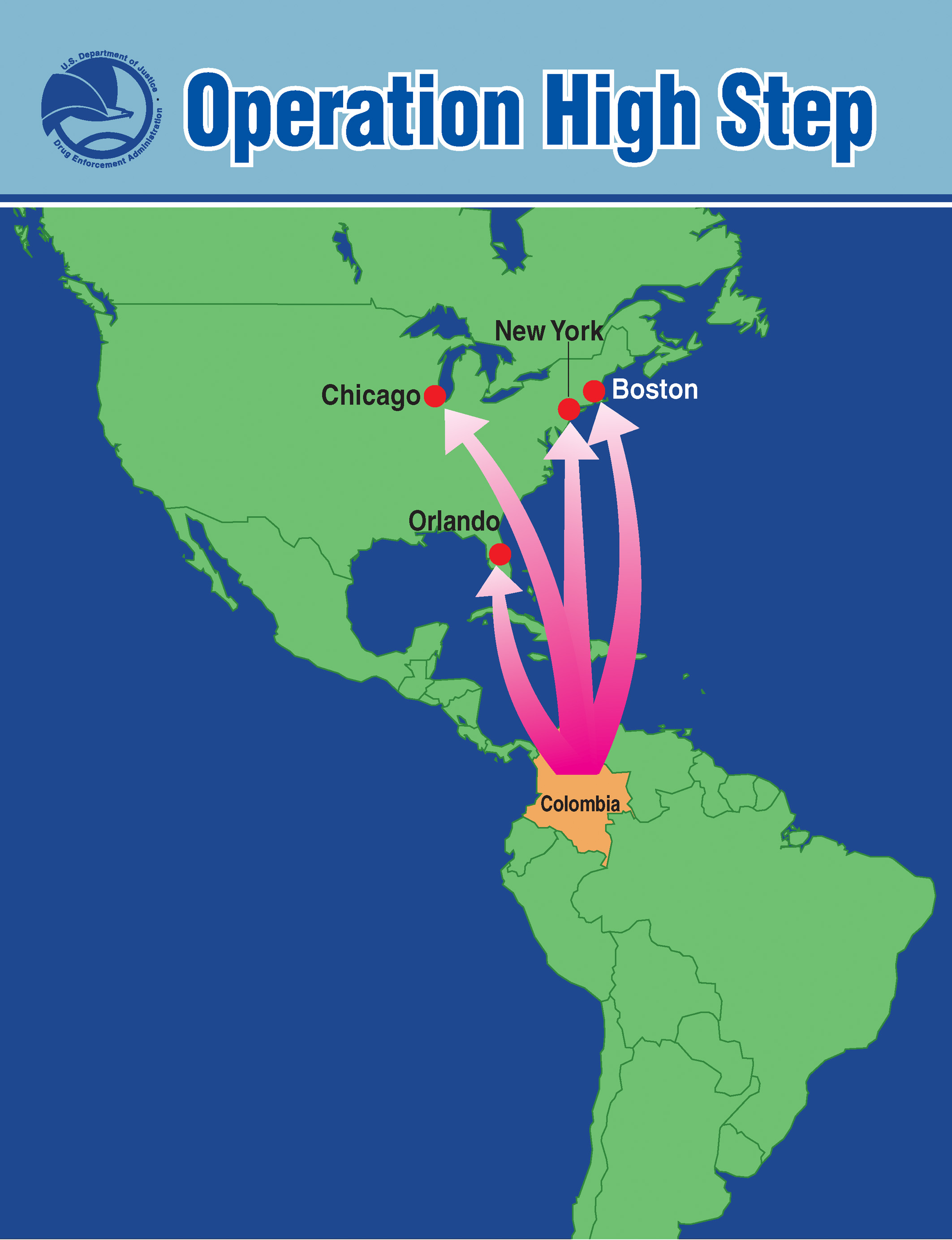
A map showing the flow of heroin from Colombia to the US.

The Colombian National Police has captured and extradited drug lords at a rate of over 100 per year for the last 10 years and currently gives technical advice to 7 countries in Latin America and 12 in Africa. Drug traffickers have resisted those actions by killing five presidential candidates Luis Carlos Galán Sarmiento, Jaime Pardo Leal, Bernardo Jaramillo Ossa, Alvaro Gómez Hurtado and Carlos Pizarro Leongómez, by allegedly planning and financing the Palace of Justice siege that left 11 of the 25 Supreme Court Justices dead, by killing over 3,000 members of the Union Patriótica political party, and by assassinating countless police officers, judges and witnesses.

== History of drug production ==
=== Marijuana ===
The marijuana drug trade was the gateway to what would eventually make Colombia’s drug industry so prevalent. In the 1960s, marijuana production was centralized in Mexico and Jamaica. Mexico had direct transports to the United States and were their main supplier of the plant. To counter increasing production and consumption, the government of the United States and the government of Colombia along with other countries initiated a campaign called the "war on drugs". Part of this campaign was a series of “eradication programs” which drove American consumers away from Mexican exports. With this new gap in the marijuana industry, Colombian growers took the opportunity to join the business. Colombian growers were successful due to the extensive rural regions that were negligible to the government.

=== Cocaine ===
The scarcity of the coca industry and unique growing environment made cocaine production a very profitable industry for Colombia. Raw coca has specific cultivation needs that can only be fulfilled in a limited number of tropical countries. Similarly to the marijuana industry, cocaine producers set up in the depths of Colombian jungles where they could be left undetected and undisrupted. Between 1993 and 1999 Colombia became the main global producer of raw coca, as well as of refined cocaine. Two factors that allowed the coca business to boom in the 1990s: the end of the cold war depleted the funds of the Fuerzas Armadas Revolucionarias de Colombia prompting them to turn to the illegal drug industry for revenue, and the promotion and protection of coca cultivation helped paramilitary groups sustain power with local support.

The process of creating the drug was relatively simple and could be accomplished with minimal technology. The coca leaves were collected and then “soaked in gasoline and other chemicals to extract the coca base”. Which as of 2011 it was estimated by the United Nations Office on Drugs and Crime (UNDOC) that 63,330 homes were involved in the cultivation process of the coca leaf. The next step is taking the extracted base and compressing it of all water until it's an “easy-to-handle brick containing about 50 percent cocaine”. This is the final part of the process that is then shipped to distributors. The value of the cocaine trade is assessed at $10 billion per year in U.S. dollars. Colombia's share of coca production is estimated at 43% of global production.

As of 2020 the area of coca bush cultivation in Colombia decreased by 7.1% but this was offset by increases in Peru 13% and Bolivia 15.3% which is where Colombia gets much of its raw cocaine materials from. Despite the decrease in cultivation land, Colombia still holds the largest share of coca bush cultivation accounting for roughly 61% of global cultivation. Further, despite the recent decrease in land Colombia's manufacturing of cocaine increased by 8% continuing its reign as the largest cocaine producer.

=== Heroin ===
Colombia has a long history of producing heroin, but this production has been decreasing significantly over the past several years as criminal groups have shifted their focus of production towards other drugs and other sources of trafficking. Most of the heroin produced in Colombia is derived from opium poppies grown in the southwestern region of the country, specifically in Nariño, which border Ecuador. The production process involved refining raw opium sap into morphine and then converting the morphine into heroin. According to the United Nation Office on Drugs and Crime (UNODC), the area of opium poppy cultivation in Colombia has decreased by 26% between 2019 and 2020, from 3,330 hectares to 2,460 hectares. This decline is a part of a larger regional trend, as the overall area of opium poppy cultivation in Latin America and the Caribbean decreased by 18% during the same period. According to UNODC, Colombia produced an estimated 1.5 metric tons of pure heroin in 2020. This represents a significant decrease from the peak production levels of 2016-2017, when Colombia was estimated to produce up to 9 metric tons of heroin.

== Cocaine production ==
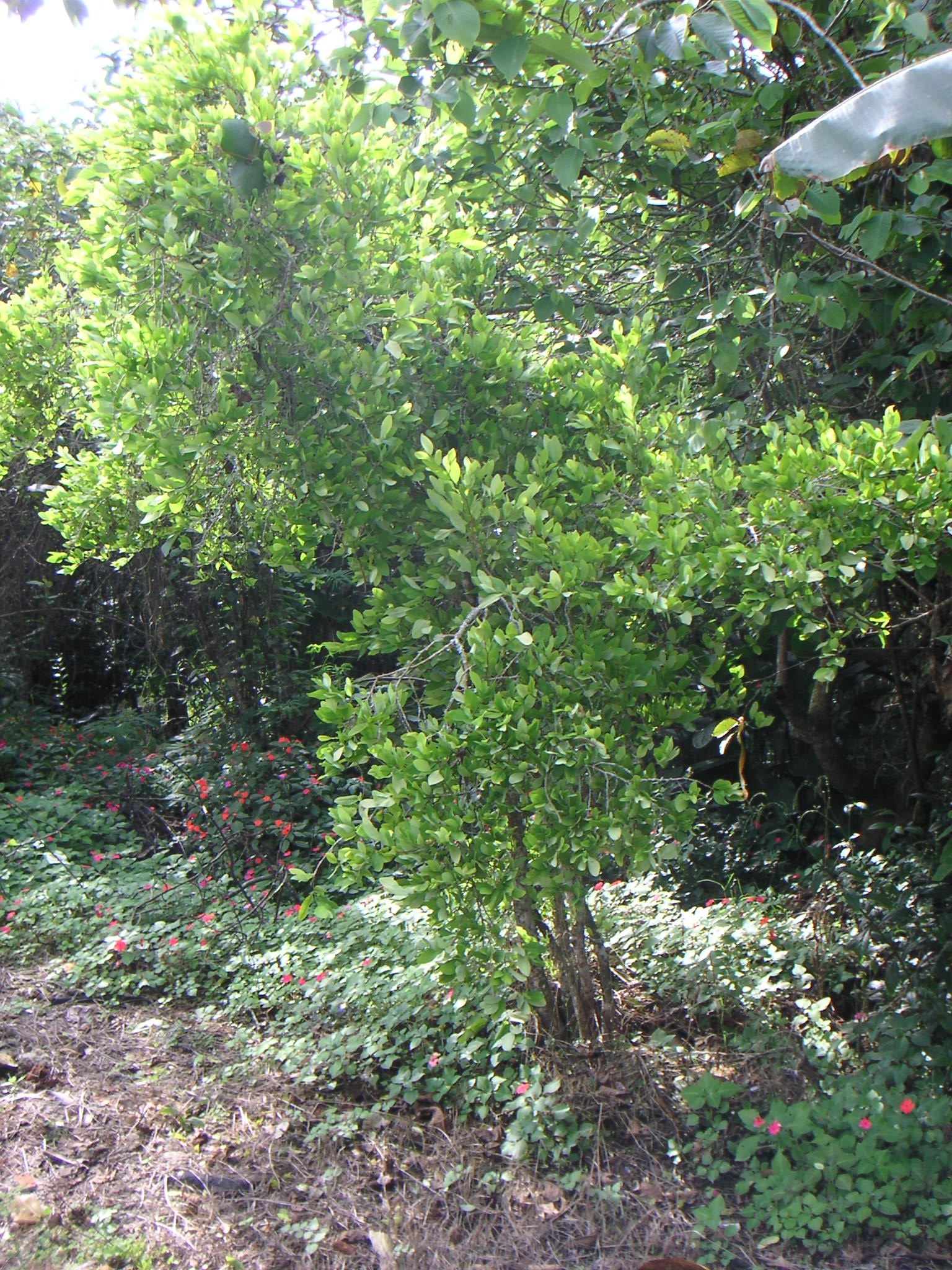
A coca plant.

Between 1993 and 1999 Colombia became the main global producer of raw coca, as well as of refined cocaine, and one of the major exporters of heroin.

The value of the cocaine trade is assessed at $10 billion per year in U.S. dollars. Colombia's share of coca production is estimated at 43% of global production.

=== Effects ===
The effects of cocaine production range from environmental damage to effects on education, health and the country's economy.

The environment is damaged through deforestation caused by clearing fields for plant cultivation. Soil erosion and chemical pollution also have effects on Colombia. The issues are difficult to address because of the wealth and power of drug traffickers.

Many plantations provide prostitutes to sustain their employees. Sexually transmitted diseases are spread at a rapid pace and contribute to the workers' inability to heal from the flesh wounds and their incapability of survival outside of this environment.

The few positive outcomes from the manufacturing of cocaine include temporarily providing a job for a family struggling financially and raising Colombia's GDP and standard of living. However, in February 2025 President Gustavo Petro stated the use of cocaine is no more serious than drinking whisky.

=== Mitigation ===
In 2000 Colombia agreed, under US pressure, to begin researching fusarium based mycoherbicides. This was supported by some American politicians, but environmentalists were among those who fiercely objected to the use of the fungus, which causes the plant sickness fusarium wilt, citing broad ecological risks that it could endanger food crops and livestock. Significant opposition delayed the project, but its supporters said there was little scientific evidence to support such claims. According to a professor of botany at the Weizmann Institute of Science in Rehovot, Israel: "What you're doing is taking a disease that is already present and putting on more of it." However, fusarium outbreaks in Peru had little impact on coca cultivation and specialists expressed doubts about whether such an herbicide would be efficacious.

== History ==
Prohibition of drugs in Colombia was based on the introduction of prohibition laws in the United States with the Harrison Narcotics Act of 1914 which prohibited the production and consumption of opiates and cocaine, in 1937 added marijuana, tobacco and alcohol and later on a variety of stimulant, depressant, and hallucinogenic drugs between 1964 and 1968.

Some psychoactive drugs were already grown in Colombia at limited level by local indigenous groups, who mostly employed marijuana and coca leaves for ceremonial and traditional medical uses as part of their culture.

=== Cocaine & heroin cartels (late 1970s-present) ===
With prohibition, established producers and traffickers formed armed and clandestine cartels. During the 1980s, as demand increased, the cartels expanded and organized into major criminal conglomerates usually headed by one or several kingpins as in the case of the Medellín Cartel and the North Coast Cartel, along with federation-style groups such as the Cali Cartel and Norte del Valle Cartel.

==== Medellín Cartel (1976–1993) ====
The Medellín Cartel led by Pablo Escobar established a ruthless organization, kidnapping or murdering those who interfered with its objectives. The Medellín Cartel was responsible for the murders of hundreds of people, including government officials, politicians, law enforcement members, journalists, relatives of same, and innocent bystanders. When conflicts emerged between the Medellín Cartel and the guerrillas, the cartel also promoted the creation of paramilitary groups.

The cartel originally imported most coca from Bolivia and Peru, processing it into cocaine inside Colombia and then distributing it through most of the trafficking routes and distribution points in the U.S., including Florida, California and New York.

The pressure mounted by the US and Colombian governments to counter them led to the cartel's destruction. Most of the cartel's associates were gunned down by police and military forces or turned themselves in to authorities in exchange for lenient prison terms.

==== Cali Cartel (1977−1995) ====
The Cali Cartel, also known as "Cali's Gentlemen", was based in southern Colombia, around the city of Cali and the Valle del Cauca Department. The Cali Cartel was founded by the Rodríguez Orejuela brothers, Gilberto and Miguel, as well as associate José Santacruz Londoño. The Cali Cartel originally began as a ring of kidnappers known as Las Chemas. The profits of kidnapping helped finance the ring's move to drug trafficking, originally beginning in Marijuana and eventually spreading to cocaine. The cartel's estimated revenue would eventually reach an estimated $7 billion a year.

The cartel's influence spread to the political and justice system. It also played a role in the manhunt that led to the death of Pablo Escobar and helped form the vigilante group "Los Pepes" (Perseguidos por Pablo Escobar), which worked alongside members of the government's elite Bloque de Busqueda (Search Bloc), exchanging information on the whereabouts of Escobar and other key members of the Medellín Cartel.

After the collapse of the cartel, it was discovered it was wiretapping phone calls made into and out of Bogotá, and was engaged in money laundering using numerous front companies spread throughout Colombia.

==== Norte del Valle Cartel (1990−2012) ====
The Norte del Valle Cartel, or North Valley Cartel, was a drug cartel which operated principally in the north of the Valle del Cauca department of Colombia. It rose to prominence during the second half of the 1990s, after the Cali Cartel and the Medellín Cartel fragmented, and was known as one of the most powerful organizations in the illegal drugs trade. The chiefs of the Norte del Valle cartel included Diego León Montoya Sánchez, Wilber Varela and Juan Carlos Ramírez Abadía. Of the original leaders of the cartel, Wilber Varela was the last remaining member being sought by the authorities, but was found dead on January 31, 2008.

The Norte del Valle cartel is estimated to have exported more than 1.2 million pounds – or 500 metric tons – of cocaine worth in excess of $10 billion from Colombia to Mexico and ultimately to the United States for resale. Indictments filed in the United States charge the Norte del Valle cartel with using violence and brutality to further its goals, including the murder of rivals, individuals who failed to pay for cocaine, and associates who were believed to be working as informants.

Leaders of the Norte del Valle cartel were further alleged to have bribed and corrupted Colombian law enforcement and Colombian legislators to, among other things, attempt to block the extradition of Colombian narcotics traffickers to the United States for further prosecution. According to the indictments filed in the United States, members of the Norte del Valle cartel even conducted their own wiretaps in Colombia to intercept the communications of rival drug traffickers and Colombian and United States law enforcement officials.

The cartel is believed to have employed the services of the United Self-Defense Forces of Colombia (AUC), a right-wing paramilitary organization internationally classified as a terrorist organization, to protect the cartel's drug routes, its drug laboratories, and its members and associates. The AUC is one of the 37 Foreign Terrorist Organizations identified by the U.S. State Department in 2004.

==== North Coast Cartel (1999−2004) ====
The North Coast Cartel was based in the Colombian city of Barranquilla by the Caribbean coast and was headed by Alberto Orlandez Gamboa "Caracol" (The Snail), who was considered as ruthless as Pablo Escobar. The organization transshipped significant amounts of cocaine to the United States and Europe via the smuggling routes it controlled from Colombia's North Coast through the Caribbean. As head of the organization, Gamboa depended on his close associates to conduct the organization's operations and to insulate himself.

The success of Caracol's Barranquilla-based drug trafficking organization was attributed in part, to the respect the drug organization received from other traffickers operating on Colombia's North Coast. DEA Intelligence indicated that traffickers paid taxes to Gamboa's organization in order to be allowed to ship drugs out of the North Coast. His influence in this region was so strong that traffickers even asked him for permission before conducting assassinations.

On June 6, 1998, Caracol was arrested in Barranquilla, as a result of an ongoing joint investigation between DEA's Barranquilla Resident Office and the Colombian National Police. After his arrest, Caracol immediately was flown to Bogotá, where he was held on murder, kidnapping, and terrorism charges. He was extradited to the United States in August 2000. On March 13, 2003, Caracol pleaded guilty to participating in a narcotics trafficking conspiracy that smuggled tens of thousands of kilograms of cocaine into New York and other cities. His plea was announced on the morning he was to go on trial in Federal District Court in Manhattan after losing a crucial appellate ruling. After the capture of Gamboa the Colombian National Police succeeded in dismantling the North Coast Cartel.

=== Government ===
The difficulty for the Colombian Government in combating the illegal drug trade is the robustness of the drug cartels. These cartels have massive social and financial networks to support their drug production. As such, these cartels protect their business by way of illegal paramilitary groups that act as non-state actors and provide financial capital to government officials, generating a corrupt political system. Although the state government has attempted to control drug production, especially in the cocaine industry, the government’s weak state capacity has proven to be ineffective in controlling the illegal drug trade and production. For example, the Colombian government has tried to eliminate coca plants by spraying chemicals.

Primarily, the Colombian Government and UNODC use three programs to reduce the coca production of civilian farmers. The Products of Peace is a governmental program that aims to support domestic farmers producing other raw goods such as coffee beans, honey, beans, and dairy products. The Forest-Warden Families Programme operates under the Presidential Programme for Social Action of Colombia. The goal of this program is to gain the support of farmers in the voluntary eradication of illegal crops in an attempt to recover forest life and create a healthy ecosystem in these vulnerable areas. Lastly, the government monitors and implements the integrated and sustainable illicit crop reduction and alternative development strategy in Colombia. This process showcases an attempt to improve the socio-economic conditions for domestic farmers by increasing their income by purchasing non-illicit crops and rewarding them for their efforts in environmental conservation.

=== Successor criminal organizations (2006–present) ===
New paramilitary groups and related drug trafficking organizations that have continued operating after the AUC demobilization process are referred to as bandas criminales emergentes or BACRIM (Spanish for "emerging criminal organizations") by the Colombian government.

Until 2011, Colombia remained the world's largest cocaine producer. Since 2003, Human Rights Watch stated that, according to their Colombian intelligence sources, "40 percent of the country's total cocaine exports" were controlled by these paramilitaries. And in 2011 an independent investigation made by the Colombian newspaper El Tiempo estimated that 50% of all Colombian cocaine was controlled by the same BACRIM groups.

According to the Colombian National Police, these groups had 3,749 members by July 2010. The NGO Instituto de Estudios para el Desarrollo y la Paz has indicated they would have approximately 6,000 armed combatants. Others estimate their ranks may include up to 10,000 people.

The successor groups are often made up of mid-level paramilitary commanders and criminal structures that either did not demobilize in the first place or were re-activated after the demobilizations had concluded. Many demobilized paramilitaries received recruitment offers, were threatened into joining the new organizations or have simultaneously rearmed and remained in government reintegration programs. New recruits have also come from traditional areas for paramilitary recruitment.

The main emerging criminal and paramilitary organizations are known as:

- The Black Eagles
- Los Rastrojos
- Los Urabeños
- Los Paisas
- Los Machos
- Los Gaitanistas
- Renacer
- Nueva Generación
- ERPAC (Popular Revolutionary Antiterrorist Army of Colombia)
- Bloque Meta
- Libertadores del Vichada
- Ejército Popular de Liberación (Formerly considered a guerrilla movement, as of 2013 considered a drug cartel.)
- The Office of Envigado (former enforcement wing for the Medellín Cartel that inherited their turf and business connections)

These groups continue to be involved in the drug trade, commit widespread human rights abuses, engage in forced displacement and undermine democratic legitimacy in other ways, both in collusion with and opposition to FARC-EP guerrillas. Their targets have included human rights defenders, labor unionists and victims of the former AUC. Members of government security forces have also been accused of tolerating their growth.

In December 2010, ERPAC paramilitary leader Pedro Guerrero, also known as Cuchillo or "Knife", died after a police raid.

In August 2025, Ismael "El Mayo" Zambada, a former high ranking leader of the Mexico-based Sinaloa Cartel, conceded in court how the Sinaloa Cartel held major influence over the trafficking of cocaine which originated in Colombia.

== Extradition treaty with the US ==
Perhaps the greatest threat posed to the Medellín Cartel and the other traffickers was the implementation of an extradition treaty between the United States and Colombia. It allowed Colombia to extradite any Colombian suspected of drug trafficking to the US and to be put on trial there for their crimes.

This was a major problem for the cartels since the drug traffickers had little to no access to their local power, resources, or influence while in the US, and a trial there would most likely lead to imprisonment. Among the staunch supporters of the extradition treaty were Colombian Justice Minister Rodrigo Lara Bonilla, Police Officer Jaime Ramírez and numerous Supreme Court Judges.

However, the cartel applied a "bend or break" strategy towards several of these supporters. When attacked against the police began to cause major losses, some of the major drug lords themselves were temporarily pushed out of Colombia. They would then go into hiding in other countries that lacked extradition treaties with the United States while they ordered cartel members to take out key supporters of the extradition treaty.

== Influence upon the armed conflict ==
With the fall of the two main drug trafficking cartels of Medellín and Cali in the 1990s, some of organizations that inherited their drug routes were members of the newly formed Norte del Valle Cartel. The FARC and ELN guerrillas came to control the coca-growing regions in the Colombian Amazon and to tax the income from the sale of coca-paste. The right-wing para-military groups initially grew out of the private armies of cocaine cartels.

Para-military groups such as the AUC assassinated trade unionists, left-wing priests and any others deemed to be leftist sympathists. They have also collaborated with Colombian state forces. "The strengthening of the Revolutionary Armed Forces of Colombia (FARC) during the 1990s was an unintended consequence of a series of tactical successes in U.S. anti-drug policies. These included dismantling the Medellín and Cali drug cartels, interdicting coca coming into Colombian processing facilities, and using drug certification requirements to pressure the Colombian government to attack drug cartels and allow aerial fumigation of coca crops. These successes, however, merely pushed coca cultivation increasingly to FARC-dominated areas while weakening many of the FARC's political-military opponents. This provided the FARC with unprecedented opportunities to extract resources from the cocaine industry to deepen its long insurgency against the Colombian state."

== See also ==
- Drug barons of Colombia
- Crime in Colombia
- Organized crime in Colombia
- Office of Foreign Assets Control (OFAC) known in Colombia as "Lista Clinton"
- Colombia–United States relations
