= Bonnie S. Klapper =

American lawyer

- Born: Brooklyn, New York
- Education: University of Pennsylvania; UC Berkeley School of Law
- Occupation: Attorney

Bonnie S. Klapper is an American lawyer who was Assistant United States Attorney in both the Central District of California and the Eastern District of New York from January 1984 to February 2012. She is in private practice, specializing in the defense of extraditables and in matters before the Office of Foreign Assets Control. She is a member of the bar in the States of New York, California, and the District of Columbia and has been admitted to Federal District Court in New York, California, Florida, Texas and the District of Columbia.

== Education ==
Klapper earned a B.A. from the University of Pennsylvania in 1979. She received her J.D. degree from the University of California, Berkeley School of Law in 1982, graduating Order of the Coif.

== Career ==
Klapper was a district court law clerk from 1982 to 1983 for Wallace Tashima in the Central District of California. Klapper joined the law firm of Tuttle & Taylor in Los Angeles, California, where she worked for two years in the litigation department on civil litigation. In 1984, Klapper became an Assistant U.S. Attorney in the Central District of California, where she specialized in narcotics money laundering investigations, prosecuting the first Title 31 structuring case in the country. In 1986, Klapper became an Assistant U.S. Attorney in the Eastern District of New York. She began in that office's money laundering unit in Brooklyn, investigating and prosecuting both drug and non-drug money laundering cases. In 1989, Klapper moved to that office's Long Island office. At that time, she worked with what was then the U.S custom service and the Immigration and Customs and the Internal Revenue Service.

In February 2012, Klapper retired from the government to become a private defense attorney.

== Notable cases ==
=== The Panama investigation/Valenciano ===
Klapper obtained an indictment and conviction of Maximiliano Bonilla, also known as Valenciano Bonilla a trafficker operating in Colombia.

=== The Don Lucho Super Cartel ===
During the last years of her career as an Assistant U.S. Attorney, Klapper was the lead prosecutor, working with ICE and DEA agents domestically in New York, Tampa, and Colombia, Mexico and Argentina, of the Luis Caicedo Organization. Klapper and the agents identified, obtained indictments of and convicted the entire hierarchy of this organization, from its leaders to its suppliers, transporters and money laundering, thereby dismantling an organization that became known as the Super Cartel because of the staggering quantity of cocaine it exported to the United States and Europe. Conservative estimates are that this organization sent approximately 800,000 kilograms of cocaine from Colombia to the U.S. and laundered approximately $4 billion during a six-year period. Over 20 individuals were convicted, approximately $173 million in drug money was seized, approximately 3,800 kilos was seized, and several fast boast and semisubmersibles were seized. She appeared on the CBS 60 Minutes episode Taking down Colombia's "super cartel" regarding the case.

== Personal life ==
Klapper is an advocate for animal rights. She worked with Animal Rescue Corps in 2022 to rescue dogs from a shelter threatened by organized crime. Klapper has provided pro bono legal work for animal advocacy organizations as well as representing and advising animal rights activists charged with crimes relating to protest activity.

== In popular media ==
Klapper work was featured in the CNN show Declassified episode "the North Valle Cartel", which aired on October 6, 2019. Klapper is also featured in the National Geographic Series “Drug Lords – Next Generation.”

Klapper has been interviewed in the US, South America and Europe as an expert in the areas of drug trafficking, money laundering and legal ethics and has acted as a legal commentator for the Associated Press, Vice Media, the BBC and the Guardian.

Klapper’s work rescuing dogs from the cartel/gang wars in Mexico has featured in print media and on radio.
