= Directorate of Criminal Investigation and Interpol =

Columbian police unit

The Directorate of Criminal Investigation and Interpol Spanish: Dirección de Investigación Criminal e Interpol (DICI), formerly the Central Directorate of the Judicial Police and Intelligence (Spanish: Dirección Central de Policía Judicial e Inteligencia, DIJIN) is a Directorate of the Colombian National Police in charge of judicial and certain intelligence tasks.

== History ==
Seal of the former DIJIN

Duties related to this directorate were first assigned in 1827 during the Greater Colombia when Police commissaries were ordered with criminal and investigations affairs. In 1891 the Colombian National Police was formally founded and judicial and intelligence related duties were assigned to a Security Division developing the following year into a new section called Inspección de Permanencia or "Permanence Inspection" officially giving Judicial functions to the National Police. After the Thousand Days War, in 1905 the Judicial Police Commissary is created to train summaries in charge of crime and delinquency investigations. Later in 1914 the Detectives Academy is founded.

In 1915 The National Police is divided into three groups, the Judicial Police becoming one of these and with the main function of investigating crimes. In 1934 the Central Identification Cabinet is created to support law execution and requirements by the judicial power. In 1940 the National Police was restructured into four departments, in which judicial police functions were assigned to the Identification and Investigation Department, later renamed as the Criminal Investigations Department.

Once again the National went through another restructuring due to social and political instability under the name of Security National Service produced by El Bogotazo and La Violencia. In 1953, during the military dictatorship of Gustavo Rojas Pinilla, duties were restructured once again and assigned to the Colombian Intelligence Service (Servicio de Inteligencia Colombiano and put under the command of the Police Force, also under the Ministry of War. Intelligence duties were given to the F-2, (personnel (F-1), intelligence (F-2), operations (F-3), and logistics (F-4)). In 1964 the National Police was restructured and the F-2 was renamed into the F-2 Department of the Higher Command. By 1969 the Criminalistics Lab is created under the command of the Information, Judicial Police and Criminal Statistics Division (División de Información, Policía Judicial y Estadística Criminal in Spanish) (DIPEC) and assigned to the Ministry of Defense. On January 15, 1977, the Center for Criminal Investigations is created and later restructured under the name Central Directorate of the Judicial Police and Intelligence (DIJIN). In the year 2000 the DIJIN is reassigned to be under the command of the Colombian National Police (previously under the National Defense Ministry) and becomes a Directorate.
