= El cartel (TV series) =

Colombian television series

- El cartel de los sapos
- Genre: Action, drama, Narconovela
- Based on: El cartel by Andrés Lopez
- Written by: Juan Camilo Ferrand
- Directed by: Luis Alberto Restrepo
- Starring: Manolo Cardona; Karen Martínez; Diego Cadavid; Robinson Díaz
- Country of origin: Colombia
- Original language: Spanish (Note: With some dialogue in English and Portuguese.)
- No. of seasons: 2
- No. of episodes: 107

Production
- Production locations: Colombia; United States; Mexico; Venezuela; Ecuador
- Running time: 45 minutes

Original release
- Release: June 4, 2008 – May 21, 2010

Related
- El Cartel de los Sapos; The Snitch Cartel: Origins

El cartel de los sapos (English title: The Cartel of Snitches) or El cartel is a Colombian television series that first aired on June 4, 2008 on the Colombian network Caracol TV. El cartel stars Manolo Cardona, Karen Martínez, Diego Cadavid, and Robinson Díaz and is based on the 2008 novel by the same name by Andrés López López, alias Florecita ("Little Flower"), a former drug dealer who, while in prison, wrote the fictionalized account of his experiences in the Cali Cartel and of what happened within the Norte del Valle Cartel. In the TV series, which Lopez also wrote, the characters and locations from the book were changed.

== Synopsis ==
Two friends enter the narcotics business in an attempt to get rich quick. Drug trafficking seems attractive to middle-class people who overlook the associated dangers and legal problems.

This choice begins a turbulent and troubled lifestyle that will change their fates forever. Martín, alias "Fresita", gets a job in a drugs lab sponsored by the big boss Óscar Cadena (Fernando Solorzano). Martín learns the business quickly and starts to send illegal drugs to the United States, while his boss makes an alliance with the Villegas Brothers, from the West Cartel, to take down the biggest drug dealer ever: Pablo Escobar.

With Escobar down, a new cartel is up: The Pacific Cartel in Colombia, led by Óscar Cadena, so Óscar (the teacher) and Martín (the student) make a pact of friendship and business.

Martín becomes a rich man and he falls for Sofía (Karen Martinez), a beautiful woman, but he wins her heart by lying to her. But Sofía discovers the origin of Martín's wealth, and he has to choose: Sofía or the business.

Óscar helps the police finish the West Cartel. The snitches (sapos) make war between these criminal machines to the point of breaking.

Oscar has been killed and decided to make Martin as the owner of the cartel. Martín refuses to take part in this war and decides to go to Miami with Sofía and his children, unaware that Miami is no longer a safe place. He continues his illegal activities, meanwhile watching enemies kill his old friends.

As increasing numbers of his business partners and brothers die or get caught, Martin is forced to run to Mexico, looking for protection. He realizes too late that, in this business, you can never win. So he becomes a sapo and tells his tale to the DEA.

In the second season, Pepe, after being captured by the FBI, and now released to be a snitch, tells the rest of the story, which leads to the arrests and deaths of several drug traffickers.

== Characters ==
Caracol decided to change the characters' real names, their aliases, and some locations from the book, although the filmmakers maintained some physical resemblance between the real-life characters and their portrayers. The following tables detail the names of the characters, their portrayers, and the real life people they represent in the series. The first table also highlights the first season characters who also appear in the second season. The characters marked with an asterisk, although they do not appear in the second season, are mentioned.

Character - Nickname	Character - Nickname	Portrayed by	
Character - Nickname	Character - Nickname	First Season	Second Season: Total War
Martín González Mora– El fresita* (Note: The nickname Fresita it's a play on words with 'Florecita', the real nickname of Andrés López López.)	Andrés López López – el Florecita (The Flower)	Manolo Cardona	
Sofía (Martín's wife)	María del Socorro Patiño	Karen Martínez	
Milton Jiménez – El cabo (Note: The nickname El Cabo is a reference to the fact that Wilber Varela (the drug lord who inspired El Cabo) was supposedly a sergeant in the Colombian National Police before becoming a drug trafficker.)	Wílber Alirio Varela – Jabón	Robinson Díaz	Robinson Díaz
Pepe Cadena	Fernando Henao - El Grillo	Diego Cadavid	Diego Cadavid
Óscar Cadena*	José Orlando Henao Montoya- el Hombre del Overol	Fernando Solórzano	
Álvaro José Pérez - Guadaña*	Luis Alfonso Ocampo Fómeque - Tocayo	Julián Arango	
Amparo Cadena	Lorena Henao Montoya	Sandra Reyes	Sandra Reyes
John Mario Martínez - Pirulito (Note: Pirulito is a popular brand of lollipops in Colombia, making a clear reference to the drug trafficker.)	Juan Carlos Ramírez - Chupeta	Juan Pablo Raba	Camilo Sáenz
Julio Trujillo	Iván Urdinola - El Enano	Fernando Arévalo	
Conrado Cadena - El Mocho	Arcángel Henao - El Mocho	Álvaro Rodríguez	
Alfonso Rendón - Anestesia	Carlos Zapata - El Médico	Andrés Parra	Andrés Parra
Humberto Paredes - Humber	Efraín Hernández - Don Efra	Juan Ángel	
Loaiza, empleado de Don Húmber	Fernando Cifuentes Villa	Manuel Cabral Vargas	
Samuel Morales	Miguel Solano - Miguelito	Luis Alfredo Velasco	
Mario Lopera - Don Mario	Diego Montoya - Don Diego	Santiago Moure	Santiago Moure
Gonzalo Tovar - Buñuelo	Luis Hernando Gómez - Rasguño	Juan Carlos Arango	Juan Carlos Arango
Apolinar S. Santilla - El Negro Santilla	Jorge E. Asprilla - El Negro Asprilla	Elkin Córdoba	
Eliana Saldarriaga de Cadena*	Cristina Santana	Juliana Galvis	
Juanita Marín de Tejada*	Natalia París Gaviria	Nataly Umaña	
Juliana Morales León	Rosario Molano	Natalia Betancurt	
Agente Sam Mathews (DEA)	Agent Romedio Viola (DEA)	John Gertz	John Gertz
Agent Katherine (DEA)	—	Paulina Gálvez	Paulina Gálvez
Agent Peter McAllister (FBI, DEA)	Agente Terry Cole (DEA)	Anthony Guzmán	Anthony Guzmán
'El Ovejo'	Óscar Varela García - Capachivo	Harold Córdoba	Harold Córdoba
Fermín Urrego Pérez - El Tigre	Víctor Patiño Fómeque - La Fiera	Waldo Urrego	Waldo Urrego
Coronel Ramiro Gutiérrez	Coronel Danilo González	Alberto Palacio	
David Paz	Baruch Vega - El Fotógrafo	Armando Gutiérrez	
Hugo de la Cruz	Pacho Herrera	Pedro Mogollón	
'Gordo' Fidel	Lief Hernández	Sergio Doré Jr.	
General Javier Ibarra	General Rosso José Serrano	Germán Quintero	
Emmanuel Villegas	Miguel Rodríguez Orejuela	Víctor Cifuentes	Víctor Cifuentes
Leonardo Villegas	Gilberto Rodríguez Orejuela	Hermes Camelo	Hermes Camelo
Ignacio 'Nacho' Sotomayor	Chepe Santacruz	Néstor Alfonso Rojas	
Manny (novio de Hugo de la Cruz)	Gaby	Andrés Toro	
Tulio de la Cruz - Doble Rueda	José Manuel Herrera - El Inválido	Alberto Barrero	
Pedro Tejada - Revólver	Julio Correa - Julio Fierro	Jimmy Vásquez	
Susana de Cadena	—	Carolina Cuervo	
Francisco José Trujillo	Julio Fabio Urdinola Grajales	Mauricio Vélez	
Silvio Méndez	Lucio Quintero Marín	Joavany Álvarez	
Giovanny Navarro	Nicoll Antonio Parra	Alejandro Tamayo	
Caremico	Juan Carlos Velasco - Trompa de marrano	Christian Tappan	
Kevin Izquierdo - Kevin	Richard Martínez	Juan Calderón	
Guillermo Polo - Guillo	—	Dorian Keller	Dorian Keller
Isabel 'Ita' González	—	Consuelo Luzardo	
Miryam Mora de González	—	Pilar Uribe	
Perla González Mora	—	Carolina Lizarazo	
Ana de Morales	Ángela de Solano	Tania Fálquez	
René Zamudio	José Manuel Chepe Puello	Federico Rivera	
'El Piojoso'	Daniel Mejía Ángel	Hader Suárez	
Giselle	—	Angeline Moncayo	
Frentón	Jorge Botero Fofe	Ramsés Ramos	
El Contador	El Secre	Mauricio Navas	
Agente James Cleaver (CPB)	Agente Edward Kacerosky (CPB)	Cyril Serrao	
Jacobo	—	Emerson Yañez	
Omar Godoy - Navaja	Juan Carlos Ortiz - Cuchilla	Rodolfo Silva	
Adolfo Aguilar	Carlos Castaño	Mauricio Mejía	
Belinda	—	Linda Lucía Callejas	
Soledad de Cadena	Piedad Vélez de Henao	Majida Issa	
Myriam de Saldarriaga	—	Rita Bendeck	
'Gargajo'	Luis Antonio Uribe Serna	Rafael Uribe Ochoa	
'Señuelo'	—	John Alex Toro	
'Antifaz'	'Máscara'	Julio Pachón	
Cristián	—	Julio Ocampo	
Jonathan de la Cruz	William Herrera Buitrago	Roberto Marín	
Israel de la Cruz	Álvaro Herrera Buitrago	Héctor García Cortés	
'Bodegón'	'Capulina'	Rodrigo Marulanda	
'Lagartija'		Johnny Acero	
'El Seco'	'El Sardino'	Ricardo Abarca	
William Torres	—	Nelson Tallaferro	
Coronel Jorge Millán/Capitán Harvey Racines	Jaime Hernán Pineda 'Pedro Pineda' o 'Pispis'	Julio Correal	Tommy Vásquez
Steven Douglas	—	Brandon Fokken	
Abogado Carlos Buitrago	Abogado Gerardo Candamil	Alberto Saavedra	
Pilar Gutiérrez	—	Laura Londoño	
Leopoldo Aguilar	Vicente Castaño	—	—
Andrea Negrete - La Mera Mera	Sandra Ávila - La Reina del Pacífico		Patricia Manterola
Raimundo Salgado - Antenas	Ramón Oliveros - Parabólica		John Alex Toro
John Clemente - El Gringuete o Gordon John	William Tamayo Hernández - Mazinger		Luis Eduardo Arango
Diego Casas - Caliche	José Diego Pedraza - Casadiego		Carlos Mario Echavarría
Victoria "Vicky" Puerta	Yovanna Guzmán		Carolina Guerra
Bernardo Lemaitre	Gustavo Alberto Borda		Julio Echeverry
Holger Prado - El Puma	Juan Diego Espinoza - 'El Tigre'		Víctor Mallarino
'El Primo'	Carlos Alberto Rentería - Beto Rentería		Luis Fernando Montoya
Mayor Luis Madero - El Caza Narcos	Mayor Elkin Leonardo Molina		Alejandro Martínez
María Luisa Higuera	—		Margarita Muñoz
Mayor Nemesio Bravo	Coronel Bayron José Carvajal		Juan Carlos Manrique
Aracely, tía de Johanna	—		Marcela Agudelo
Johanna Lesmes	—		Angélica Blandon
Teniente Calero	—		Julián Álvarez
Larissa Márquez de Casas	Yamely Rico		Paula Barreto
Rodolfo Villate - El Rockie	—		Juan Sebastián Aragón
Marcela Hernández - La India	—		Yesenia Valencia
Blanca Racines	—		Paola Dulce
Lina María Acevedo	Paula Andrea Betancourt		Andrea Noceti
Zully Carmona	Nancy Patricia Cadavid		Diana Hoyos
Patricia Carmona	Libia Victoria Cadavid		Sandra Guzmán
Olano	—		Dairo Martínez
Oliver García	Albeiro Monsalve		Ramiro Sandoval
'Lampiño'	—		Julio Pachón
Antonio Villegas	Sigifredo Rodríguez Orejuela		Jhonny Rivera
Olga de Martínez	Yessica Paola Rojas Morales		Patricia Castañeda
Agente Lilian Young (DEA)	—		Michelle Manterola
Juan B. Guillén - El Piloto	Amado Carrillo		Esteban Franco
'El Golfo'	Miguel Félix Gallardo		Guillermo Quintanilla
'XL'	Alcides Ramón Magaña - El Metro		Ramón Medina
Doctor Rayo	Doctor Wilfrido Barrios Chávez		Carlos Serrato
Mariachi de El Piloto	—		Gustavo Ángel
'El Golfo's bodyguard	—		Carlos Arrechea
Wilson Gamboa - "Paredón"	Carlos Arturo Patiño - Patemuro		Joltzman Núñez
Weimar Castro - Caremotor	Wenceslao Caicedo Mosquera - El Señor de la Motosierra		Carlos Sánchez
Pedro - Manteco	Weimar Pérez Aranguro - El Grasoso		Ulíses González
Mogollo	Gilmer Humberto Quintero Arias - El Cabezón		Giovanni Galindo
Renso Cobo - Don Teto	Eduardo Restrepo Victoria - El Socio		Gastón Velandia
Jaime Vélez - Pajarraco	Carlos José Robayo - Guacamayo		Bernardo García
Milton de Jesús Jiménez - Jimenito	Wilber Felipe Varela Camacho - "Varelita"		Juan Hugo Cárdenas
Luisinho	Fernandinho Beira-Mar		Bárbaro Marín
Joyce	Jacqueline Alcântara Morais		Viña Machado
'El Pariente'	Carlos Mario Jiménez - Macaco		Manuel Gómez Gutiérrez
Lucía	Olga Cecilia Gómez		Mónica Franco
Sebastián Bonera	—		Carlos Humberto Camacho
Abogado Eddy Doménico	Abogado Joaquín Perez		Gilberto Reyes
Farid Duarte	—		Ismael Barrios
Agent of DEA	—		Ilja Rosendahl
Fiscal Lucía Armstrong	Fiscal Bonnie S. Klapper		Ioulia Pakhomova
Julián Levy	—		Guy Davidyan
General Gervasio Morales	General Hugo Armando Carvajal		Rafael Lahera
Gildardo Jiménez	—		Jarol Fonseca Álzate

== Associated media ==
The book upon which the TV series is based also inspired the film El Cartel de los Sapos (2011). Lopez has also written several additional books based on his and his associates' experiences in the drug trade.

=== Prequel ===
A prequel series; The Snitch Cartel: Origins was released by Caracol Televisión in 2021.
