= The Snitch Cartel =

2011 film

- Film poster
- Directed by: Carlos Moreno
- Written by: Luiso Berdejo; Juan Camilo Ferrand
- Based on: El cartel de los sapos by Andrés López López
- Produced by: Manolo Cardona
- Starring: Manolo Cardona
- Cinematography: Mateo Londono
- Release date: 11 November 2011
- Running time: 81 minutes
- Country: Colombia
- Language: Spanish
- Box office: $2.1 million

The Snitch Cartel (Spanish: El Cartel de los Sapos) is a 2011 Colombian crime film directed by Carlos Moreno. The film was selected as the Colombian entry for the Best Foreign Language Oscar at the 85th Academy Awards but did not make the final shortlist.

The film, like the 2008 Caracol TV series El Cartel, is based on the 2008 novel of the same name by Andrés López López, alias Florecita ("Little Flower"), a former drug dealer who, while in prison, wrote the fictionalized account of his experiences in the Cali Cartel and of what happened within the Norte del Valle Cartel.

== Plot ==
Two friends enter the illegal drugs business, one of them is a lower-class boy, Martin, alias Fresita ("Little Strawberry"), a smart and skilled young man seeking to earn money to gain the attention of his childhood love, Sofia. His new boss, Óscar Cadena, makes a plan to take down the powerful Medellin Cartel, that is headed by the infamous don Pablo Escobar, while Martin moves up fast in the syndicate, becoming a vital part of the growing North Valley Cartel, he begins a turbulent life in the midst of a cartel war which he is uncanny to take part in, forcing him to move to Mexico looking for allies while struggling between the money and power that he now has, and becoming a sapo (snitch) for the DEA, to protect his beloved Sofia.

== Cast ==
- Manolo Cardona as Martin "Fresita"
- Tom Sizemore as DEA Agent Sam Mathews
- Juana Acosta as Sofia
- Kuno Becker as Damian
- Diego Cadavid as Pepe Cadena
- Robinson Díaz as "El Cabo"
- Julian Arango as Guadana
- Andrés Parra as Anestesia
- Fernando Solórzano as Oscar Cadena
- Juan Pablo Raba as Pirulo
- Ilja Rosendahl as Prison Guard
- Jhonny Rivera as Antonio Villegas
- Pedro Armendáriz, Jr. as Mexican Drug Lord Modesto

== Associated media ==
In addition to the aforementioned 2008 book that inspired both the 2011 film and the 2008 TV series, Lopez has written several additional books about his and his associates' experiences in the drug trade.

== See also ==
- List of submissions to the 85th Academy Awards for Best Foreign Language Film
- List of Colombian submissions for the Academy Award for Best Foreign Language Film
