= Diego León Montoya Sánchez =

Colombian drug trafficker

FBI Ten Most Wanted Fugitive
- Charges: In Colombia: Drug trafficking and smuggling, racketeering, money laundering, Conformation of paramilitary groups in Colombia. In the United States: Conspiracy to import and possess with intent to deliver weed cocaine; Possession with intent to deliver cocaine; Money laundering; Racketeering Influenced and Corrupt Organizations (RICO) – Drug trafficking; Conspiracy to distribute or manufacture cocaine abroad with knowledge or intent that it be imported into the United States
- Alias: Don Diego

Description
- Born: January 11, 1958 (age 67) or January 11, 1961 (age 64); Trujillo, Colombia
- Occupation: Leader of the Norte del Valle Cartel

Status
- Status: Captured
- Added: 6 May 2004
- Caught: 10 September 2007
- Number: 478
- Captured

Diego León Montoya Sánchez (born January 11, 1958/1961), also known as Don Diego, is a Colombian former crime boss and leader of the Norte del Valle drug cartel. On October 25, 2002, Montoya was listed as a Specially Designated Narcotics Trafficker on the United States Department of Treasury's Specially Designated National List (also known as La Lista Clinton).

On May 6, 2004, he became the 478th fugitive listed by the United States' Federal Bureau of Investigation (FBI) on the Ten Most Wanted Fugitives list. He was also wanted in Colombia, where authorities started numerous operations to capture him or his interests.

The U.S. Department of State's Narcotics Rewards Program offered a reward of up to $5 million for information leading directly to Montoya's arrest or conviction, the highest amount offered at the time for a non-terrorist fugitive, effectively making the priority of his capture second only to that of Osama bin Laden.

In January 2007, Montoya's brother and co-leader of the cartel, Eugenio, was captured in Colombia. Colombian authorities announced on September 10 that they had arrested Montoya himself in the west of the country after a long manhunt. On December 12, 2008, Montoya was extradited to Miami on a D.E.A. helicopter, marking the final demise of the Norte del Valle Cartel.

== Statement from FBI ==
Montoya was sought in connection with the manufacture and distribution of multiple tons of cocaine, knowing or intending that it would be imported into the United States. Montoya is reputedly one of the principal leaders of the Colombian North Valley cartel. The North Valley cartel is believed to be the most powerful and violent drug-trafficking organization in Colombia. The cartel reportedly relies heavily on illegal armed groups for protection, taking help from right-wing paramilitaries as well as leftist rebels.

Montoya has used the known aliases Diego Montoya, Diego Sanchez-Montoya, "Don Diego", "El Señor de la Guerra" (the warlord), "El Ciclista" (the cyclist).

Montoya was thought to be under the protection of the United Self-Defense Forces of Colombia, a paramilitary group run by Carlos and Vincente Castaño.

== Description ==
Dates of Birth Used	11 January 1958; 11 January 1961
Hair	Black
Place of Birth	Trujillo, Colombia
Eyes	Brown
Height	6 ft 0 in (1.83 m)
Complexion	Medium
Weight	230 pounds (104 kg)
Build	Heavy
Sex	Male
Race	White (Hispanic)
Occupation	Rancher
Nationality	Colombian
Scars and Marks	Surgical scars on his lower back and legs due to injuries sustained in an automobile accident

== Bribing of Colombian military and police forces ==
On August 26, 2007, the Colombian media reported that members of the Norte del Valle Cartel had been bribing military and police units to deactivate radars and allow the cartel to ship illegal drugs from Colombia. The newspaper El Tiempo reported that the Colombian Navy had been the most infiltrated through bribes ordered by Montoya and his men. The newspaper also revealed the possible involvement of an Admiral of the Colombian Navy named Gabriel Arango who used his influence to support drug cartels. Arango marked documents related to this as classified and with a "horseshoe logo"; authorities later found that these were the flight routes of the Norte del Valle Cartel along both the Pacific and Caribbean coasts through Ecuador, Panama, Colombia and Venezuela.

== Capture ==
Montoya was captured on September 10, 2007, by Colombian authorities in a rural area of the municipality of Zarzal in Valle del Cauca Department after two hours of fighting with security ring.

In a briefing by the Colombian Ministry of Defense during the presentation of Montoya to the public through Caracol TV, the General of the Colombian Army Mario Montoya Uribe detailed the operation, dubbed as Operation Simeón, which started at 0430 hrs on 10 September 2007 after a military intelligence operation between the municipalities of Zarzal and La Unión in northern Valle del Cauca Department. General Montoya said that Montoya had a security ring in a jungle rural area. Montoya was accompanied by his mother and some 17 other close relatives.

Eight years after his capture the reward is still in progress and has not been paid.

== Extradition ==
On May 19, 2008, Colombian Interior and Justice ex-Minister Carlos Holguin announced that 'Don Diego', together with some prominent paramilitary leaders, would be extradited to the United States.

On December 12, 2008, Montoya was indeed extradited to Miami on a D.E.A. helicopter, marking the final demise of the Norte del Valle Cartel. He was scheduled to appear in court for 12 charges including drug trafficking, obstruction of justice, money laundering and murder.

== Sentencing ==
On October 21, 2009, a federal judge in Miami sentenced Montoya to 45 years in prison. Montoya had pleaded guilty to charges of conspiracy to import cocaine and obstruction of justice in August. In court Montoya apologized for his role in the cocaine trade, saying that he had "come to the conclusion that there is nothing I could ever do to repair the great harm I have caused".

It is my sincere hope to be able to bring relief to my family and the families of the victims and bring their nightmare to a conclusion. -- Diego Montoya

Approving the 45-year sentence requested by the prosecution, Judge Cecilia Altonaga said she recognized Montoya's "remorse" and his "new transition" to a life of repentance. She also ordered Montoya to pay $500,000 in restitution to the family of Jhon Jairo Garcia, a long-time associate of Montoya who was kidnapped, tortured and murdered by the Norte del Valle cartel in 2003. The prosecution claimed Montoya had ordered the killing of Garcia after accusing him of becoming an informer for U.S. law enforcement. Mr. Garcia's dismembered body was found in a river near the Colombian city of Cali.

Montoya's lawyer said his client hoped his life story would send a message that drug trafficking destroyed everything in its wake. In court documents, Montoya's defence team traced his progression from a teenager with dreams of becoming a Catholic priest to the man at the helm of a drug-trafficking ring believed to have exported $10 billion worth of cocaine to the U.S. Montoya points to his father's death when he was 14 years old as the catalyst which set him on the wrong path.

== Popular culture ==
In the television series El Cartel, Montoya is portrayed by the comic Colombian actor Santiago Moure as the character of Mario Lopera 'Don Mario'.

== See also ==
- Norte del Valle Cartel
- Narcotrafficking in Colombia
- FBI Ten Most Wanted Fugitives
- List of crime bosses convicted in the 21st century
