= Wild Eyes Productions =

American production company

- Industry: Film production
- Founded: 2001
- Founders: David Keane; Arcadia Berjonneau
- Headquarters: Hermosa Beach, California, United States
- Website: wildeyesproductions.com

Wild Eyes Productions is an American production company located in Hermosa Beach, California.

It was founded in 2001 by David Keane and his wife Arcadia Berjonneau, with the release of The True Story of Black Hawk Down the highest rated documentary to air on History Channel at the time. Working with bestselling authors such as Mark Bowden and Dean King Wild Eyes has produced content in 77 countries on six continents.

== Television ==
Title	Network	Description
Stalking Jihad	History	Documentary
The True Story of Charlie Wilson	History	Documentary
Mind Control (documentary)	A&E	Documentary
Inside Al Qaeda	National Geographic	Documentary
The True Story of Black Hawk Down	History	Documentary
The True Story of Che Guevara	History	Documentary
The True Story of Killing Pablo	History	Documentary
The Mystery of Afghan Gold	History	Documentary
Skeletons of the Sahara	History	Documentary
Guests of the Ayatollah	Discovery	Documentary (4 part)
The Mystery of the Afghan Gold	History	Documentary
Inside the Taliban	National Geographic	Documentary
Safari Africa	Discovery	Documentary
Osama Bin Laden: The Finish	History	Documentary
Iced: U.S Marshals Alaska	A&E	Documentary
Targeted: Engineer of Death	History	TV movie
Targeted: The Evil Genius	History	TV movie
Targeted: Osama Bin Laden	History	TV movie
Targeted: Pineapple Face	History	TV movie
Targeted: Baby Faced Psycho	History	TV movie
True Warriors: Urgent Fury	-	TV movie
Critical Threat: Life in the Bureau of Diplomatic Security	Pilot	TV movie
The Dark Side of Interrogation	History	TV special
The Making of the Rose Parade	-	TV special
Jillian's Travels	3Net	TV series
Heroes Under Fire	History	TV series
Living Large	-	TV series
The Squad: Prison Police	A&E	Reality TV
Bull Proof	3Net	Reality TV
The Mission	History	Reality TV
