= Anglo Colombian School =

Private school in Bogotá, Colombia

Anglo Colombiano School
- Colegio Anglo Colmbiano
- Bogotá, Colombia

Information
- Type: Private, Bilingual, non confesional
- Motto: Gentes Moresque Docendo Iungimus
- Established: February, 1956
- Founder: Jaime Jaramillo Arango
- Enrollment: 1,320 in 2026

The Anglo Colombian School (Spanish: Colegio Anglo-Colombiano) is a co-ed, private school, in Bogotá, Colombia, in February 1956 by Jaime Jaramillo Arango.

== House system ==
These are the corresponding naval historical officers and colours for each of the houses names:

House	Admiral	Colour
Rodney	George Rodney, 1st Baron, Admiral (1718–1792)	Blue
Hood	Samuel Hood, 1st Viscount, Admiral (1724–1816)	Green
Nelson	Horatio Nelson, 1st Duke of Bronté, Vice-Admiral (1758–1805)	Red
Beatty	David Beatty, 1st Earl, Admiral (1881–1936)	Yellow
Drake	Francis Drake, Vice-Admiral (1540-1596)	Black (Special Alumni House)

House events involve dance (organized choreography) competitions, debates, academic decathlons, sports day, creative writing and poetry composition contests and overall academic performance of students. The house that wins the most events is announced at the end of the school year.

In this conference, high academic level schools from all Colombia have important participation such as Colegio San Carlos, Gimnasio los Caobos, The English School (Colegio de Inglaterra), or Colegio Los Nogales, among many others.

== Notable alumni ==
- Juan Lozano Ramírez, senator and statesman
- Virginia Vallejo, writer and journalist
- Juan Gabriel Vásquez, novelist
- María Teresa Ronderos, journalist
- Sergio Jaramillo Caro, politician, diplomat and High Commissioner of Peace
- Omar Bula Escobar, economist and Chancellor of Colombia
- Clemencia Forero, Colombian philosopher and diplomat
- Enrique Santos Calderón, Colombian writer and journalist
- Daniel Bermudez, Colombian architect and professor
- Francisco José Lloreda Mera, Colombian Lawyer and diplomat
