= Virginia Vallejo =

Colombian writer, columnist, television and radio journalist

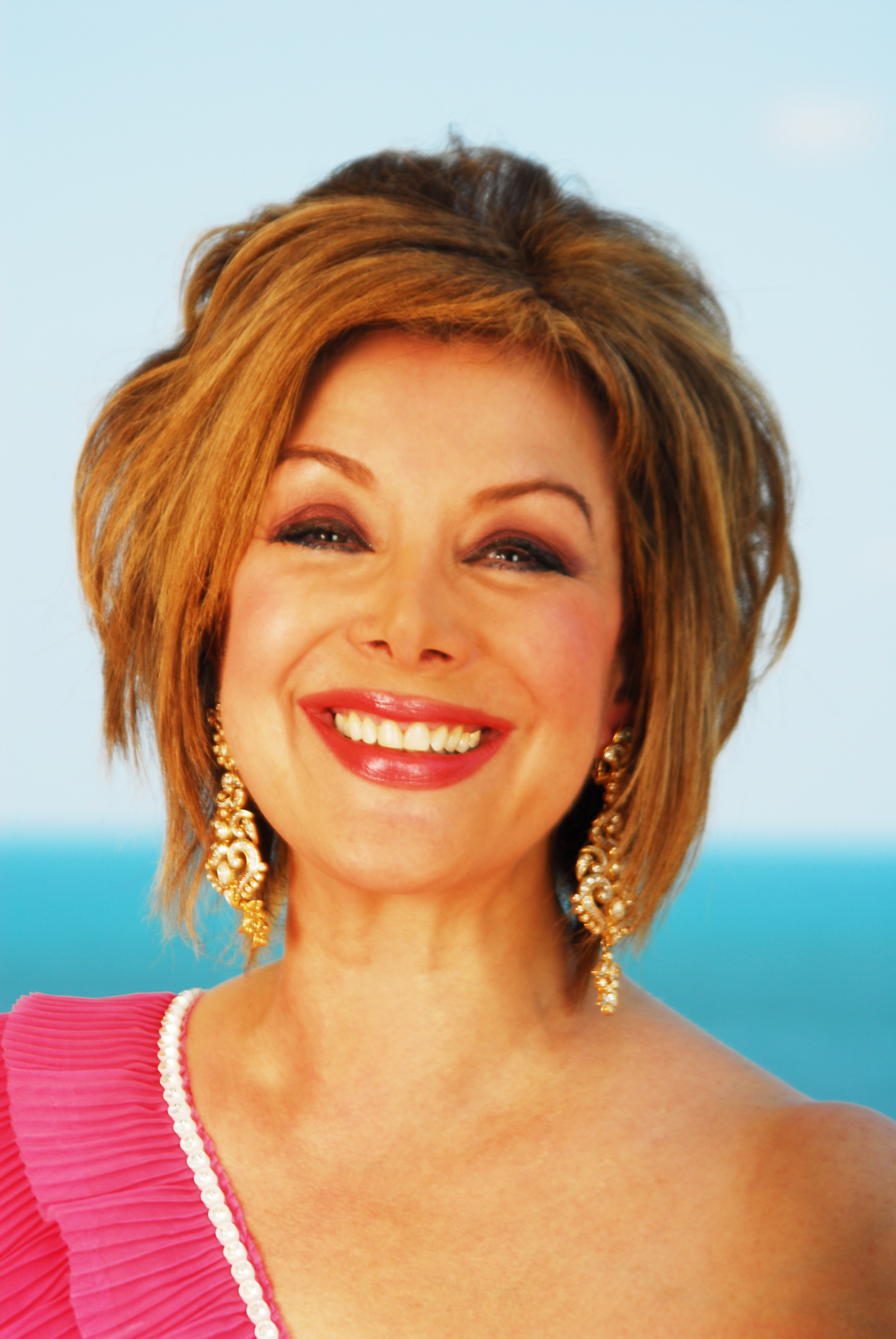
- Virginia Vallejo in 2009
- Born: Virginia Vallejo García; 26 August 1949 (age 77); Cartago, Valle del Cauca, Colombia
- Occupations: Author; Journalist; Anchorwoman; Director; Host; Columnist
- Years active: 1972–present
- Spouses: Fernando Borrero (m. 1969; div. 1971) David Stivel (m. 1978; div. 1981)
- Website: virginiavallejo.com

Virginia Vallejo García (born 26 August 1949) is a Colombian journalist, author, and former television and radio presenter known for her romantic relationship with drug trafficker Pablo Escobar during the 1980s. Following her departure from Colombia in 2006, she cooperated with authorities investigating organized crime and political corruption and was granted political asylum in the United States in 2010. In 2007, she published Amando a Pablo, odiando a Escobar (Loving Pablo, Hating Escobar), a memoir describing her relationship with Escobar and alleging connections between Colombian politicians and drug trafficking organizations. Her memoir was adapted into the 2017 film Loving Pablo.

== Early life ==
=== Family and childhood ===
Virginia Vallejo García was born on 26 August 1949 in Cartago, Valle del Cauca, Colombia, where her parents had taken refuge after the 1948 Bogotazo. Her parents were Juan Vallejo Jaramillo and Mary García Rivera. According to Vallejo, her paternal grandfather, Eduardo Vallejo Varela, served as minister of finance in 1930, and she is a grandniece of former minister of education Jaime Jaramillo Arango. She grew up in Bogotá and attended the Anglo Colombian School.

=== Early career ===
Before entering television, Vallejo taught English at the Centro Colombo Americano in Bogotá and later worked in public relations for the brewery Cervecería Andina. In 1972, she was invited to join a new television program directed by Carlos Lemos Simmonds and Aníbal Fernández de Soto, which began her broadcasting career.

== Career in the media ==
Virginia Vallejo began her broadcasting career in Colombia in 1972, working as a television presenter, journalist, and news anchor. During the 1970s and 1980s, she appeared on news and entertainment programs, including TV Sucesos-A3, Noticiero 24 Horas, and El Show de las Estrellas. In 1981, she co-founded the television production company TV Impacto with journalist Margot Ricci, producing and presenting the program ¡Al Ataque!.

In 1983, Vallejo interviewed Pablo Escobar for ¡Al Ataque!, featuring his charitable housing initiative, Medellín Sin Tugurios.The two subsequently maintained a romantic relationship from approximately 1983 to 1987. In a 2007 interview with El País, Vallejo acknowledged that Escobar had paid approximately US$250,000 in debts incurred by TV Impacto. Their relationship became a source of public controversy and adversely affected her broadcasting career. According to El País, she lost television programs and advertising contracts amid harassment and public scrutiny surrounding her association with Escobar.

Vallejo continued working in Colombian broadcasting into the early 1990s, including appearances in Sombra de tu Sombra and Todelar radio. Her career in Colombian broadcasting ended in 1994, after which she entered the multilevel marketing industry. In 2007, she published Amando a Pablo, odiando a Escobar (Loving Pablo, Hating Escobar), a memoir recounting her relationship with Escobar and alleging connections between Colombian political figures and drug trafficking organizations.

From 2009 to 2010, Vallejo worked as a columnist for the Venezuelan newspaper 6to Poder, directed by opposition journalist Leocenis García. In 2019, she returned to television journalism with Sueños y Pesadillas, a twelve-episode series for RT en Español examining social and economic issues in the United States.

== Exile and asylum in the U.S. ==
In July 2006, Virginia Vallejo publicly offered to provide testimony concerning the involvement of former Colombian justice minister Alberto Santofimio in the 1989 assassination of presidential candidate Luis Carlos Galán. On 18 July 2006, she was escorted from Colombia to Miami by United States authorities, who sought her cooperation in ongoing drug trafficking investigations. On 25 July 2006, Colombian broadcaster RCN aired Virginia acusa, a prerecorded video featuring Vallejo's allegations concerning Pablo Escobar, Alberto Santofimio, and the assassination of presidential candidate Luis Carlos Galán. The broadcast was the most-watched television program in Colombia during the week of 24–30 July, receiving a 15.5 television rating and a 54.5% audience share. Following her arrival in the United States in July 2006, Vallejo sought political asylum, citing concerns for her safety related to her testimony and public allegations concerning Colombian organized crime and political figures. In June 2010, she was granted political asylum in the United States.

== Loving Pablo, Hating Escobar ==
In 2007, Vallejo published Amando a Pablo, odiando a Escobar (Loving Pablo, Hating Escobar), a memoir recounting her relationship with Pablo Escobar during the 1980s. The book also discusses the activities of Colombian drug trafficking organizations and includes allegations concerning connections between prominent Colombian political figures and the Medellín and Cali cartels.

The memoir was adapted into the 2017 film Loving Pablo, directed by Fernando León de Aranoa, starring Penélope Cruz as Vallejo and Javier Bardem as Escobar. The film premiered at the 74th Venice International Film Festival in 2017.

In 2018, Vallejo filed a copyright infringement lawsuit against Netflix and the producers of the television series Narcos, alleging that two scenes in the series reproduced protected elements of her memoir. In November 2019, the United States District Court for the Southern District of Florida ruled in favor of the defendants. On 27 October 2020, the United States Court of Appeals for the Eleventh Circuit upheld the decision, finding that the scenes were not substantially similar to the memoir's copyright-protected expression.

== Testimonies in Colombian criminal investigations ==
In 2008, Vallejo provided testimony to Colombian prosecutors investigating the Palace of Justice siege of November 1985. During questioning at the Colombian consulate in Miami, she reiterated allegations from her memoir that Pablo Escobar had financed the M-19 guerrilla group's attack on the Palace of Justice. Her account was based in part on statements she claimed Escobar had made to her.

In August 2009, Colombian authorities questioned Vallejo in Miami as part of the investigation into the 1989 assassination of presidential candidate Luis Carlos Galán. Former justice minister Alberto Santofimio was convicted for his role in Galán's assassination in 2007. Following an appeal and the reversal of that conviction, Colombia's Supreme Court reinstated his 24-year prison sentence in 2011.

== Personal life ==
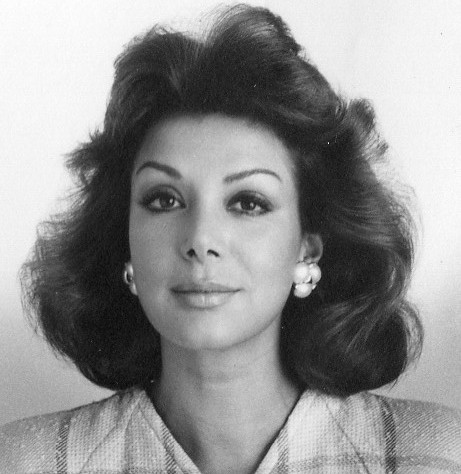
Virginia in 1987.

Vallejo was married twice, first to Colombian architect Fernando Borrero Caicedo, whom she divorced in 1971, and later to Argentine television director David Stivel, whom she divorced in 1981.

== List of works ==
- Loving Pablo, Hating Escobar (2007)
- El alucinante País Dorado (2025)

== See also ==
- List of people granted political asylum
- Javier Ceriani - Argentine journalist who received a 2010 Emmy Award for his interview with Virginia Vallejo.
