= Loving Pablo, Hating Escobar =

2007 memoir by Virginia Vallejo

- Original Spanish version
- Author: Virginia Vallejo
- Original title: Amando a Pablo, odiando a Escobar
- Language: English
- Genre: Autobiography, biography
- Publisher: Canongate (UK); Random House (US)
- Publication date: 2007
- English publication date: 2018
- Pages: 384 (UK Edition); 416 (US Edition)
- ISBN: 978-1-78689-105-1

Loving Pablo, Hating Escobar (Spanish: Amando a Pablo, odiando a Escobar) is a 2007 memoir by Colombian author and journalist Virginia Vallejo about her five-year (1982–1987) romantic relationship with Pablo Escobar, head of the Medellín Cartel. It was published by Random House Mondadori on 22 September 2007, and Random House Inc. of New York on 4 October 2007. It has been translated to sixteen languages, and inspired the 2017 film Loving Pablo.

== Plot ==
The book is divided in an introduction and three parts: The Days of Innocence and Dreams; The Days of Splendor and Terror; and The Days of Absence and Silence.

In the introduction, Virginia Vallejo describes her departure from Colombia on 18 July 2006 in a special flight of the US Drug Enforcement Administration (DEA), after she has accused a former senator and minister of justice, Alberto Santofimio, of instigating the assassination of a former presidential candidate, Luis Carlos Galán, and after she had offered her cooperation to the Department of Justice in ongoing high-profile criminal cases.

The story begins with the joy and passion of two new lovers – Pablo, an ambitious rookie politician from humble origins, and Virginia, a socialite and media personality, both 32 years old – and continues with the evolution of their relationship and Escobar's personality during his war against the extradition treaty between Colombia and the United States, and the terrorist activities of him and the Medellín Cartel in their last years.

Like a snowball, Vallejo describes the birth and boom of the cocaine industry that turned her lover into a billionaire, thanks to the cooperation of leading politicians; the origins of the Colombian rebel organizations, and the paramilitary squads founded by Escobar and his partners; the assassinations of the justice minister Rodrigo Lara in 1984, and the siege of the Palace of Justice in 1985; the suffering of the journalist after she had ended her relationship with the drug kingpin in 1987, and her cooperation with the anti drug German agency BKA in 1988; the Cuban connection, and the bombing of an airplane with 110 people on board in 1989 (Avianca Flight 203); the assassination of Luis Carlos Galán, and three more presidential candidates; the origins of Escobar's war against the Cali Cartel and the Colombian state, followed by the era of narcoterrorism from 1988 to 1993; the coalition of enforcement agencies and Escobar's enemies involved in his hunt; and, finally, the worldwide reaction to the death of the Number One Enemy of the United States on 2 December 1993.

== Reaction ==
The publication of Loving Pablo, Hating Escobar in 2007 prompted a public controversy over allegations made by Vallejo concerning Colombian president Álvaro Uribe's alleged connections to Pablo Escobar. Uribe denied having political or business dealings with Escobar and rejected the allegations.

== Copyright litigation ==
In 2018, Virginia Vallejo filed a copyright infringement lawsuit against the producers and distributors of the Netflix series Narcos, alleging that scenes in the series copied material from her memoir. In November 2019, a federal district court granted summary judgment in favor of the defendants, finding that the similarities concerned historical facts rather than protected literary expression.

On 27 October 2020, the United States Court of Appeals for the Eleventh Circuit affirmed the ruling. The appellate court noted that Vallejo had characterized her memoir as a fictional work of historical research written in the style of magical realism, while maintaining under oath that the underlying events were true. The court concluded that the historical facts described in the memoir were not protected by copyright and that the television series had not copied its protected literary expression.

== Film adaptation ==
The film Loving Pablo is based on Vallejo's book, and was released on 6 September 2017 during the 74th Venice Film Festival. The role of Vallejo is played by Penélope Cruz, while Escobar is played by her husband Javier Bardem, both winners of the Oscar of the Academy of Hollywood as best supporting actors.
