= List of 2018 box office number-one films in Italy =

The following is a list of 2018 box office number-one films in Italy.

== Number-one films ==
†	This implies the highest-grossing movie of the year.

#	Date	Film	Gross	Notes
1	January 7, 2018	Jumanji: Welcome to the Jungle	US$3,844,050	
2	January 14, 2018	Benedetta follia	US$4,222,092	
3	January 21, 2018	Benedetta follia	US$2,519,208	
4	January 28, 2018	Made In Italy	US$1,754,699	
5	February 4, 2018	The Post	US$2,882,286	
6	February 11, 2018	Fifty Shades Freed	US$7,225,994	
7	February 18, 2018	There is No Place Like Home	US$4,219,839	
8	February 25, 2018	There is No Place Like Home	US$2,363,553	
9	March 4, 2018	Red Sparrow	US$1,448,105	
10	March 11, 2018	The Shape of Water	US$1,780,938	
11	March 18, 2018	Tomb Raider	US$1,972,947	
12	March 25, 2018	Pacific Rim Uprising	US$1,387,140	
13	April 1, 2018	Ready Player One	US$2,190,206	
14	April 8, 2018	Den of Thieves	US$1,148,331	
15	April 15, 2018	Rampage	US$1,547,524	
16	April 22, 2018	Loving Pablo	US$1,175,608	
17	April 29, 2018	Avengers: Infinity War †	US$7,384,164	
18	May 6, 2018	Avengers: Infinity War †	US$3,319,713	
19	May 13, 2018	Avengers: Infinity War †	US$1,365,997	
20	May 20, 2018	Deadpool 2	US$3,123,370	
21	May 27, 2018	Solo: A Star Wars Story	US$1,721,414	
22	June 3, 2018	Solo: A Star Wars Story	US$1,021,898	
23	June 10, 2018	Jurassic World: Fallen Kingdom	US$4,272,975	
24	June 17, 2018	Jurassic World: Fallen Kingdom	US$2,080,721	
25	June 24, 2018	Jurassic World: Fallen Kingdom	US$1,093,657	
26	July 1, 2018	Jurassic World: Fallen Kingdom	US$538,051	
27	July 8, 2018	The First Purge	US$632,126	
28	July 15, 2018	12 Strong	US$277,302	
29	July 22, 2018	Skyscraper	US$727,184	
30	July 29, 2018	Ocean's 8	US$1,046,248	
31	August 5, 2018	Ocean's 8	US$687,034	
32	August 12, 2018	The Meg	US$1,879,928	
33	August 19, 2018	Ant-Man and the Wasp	US$1,340,247	
34	August 26, 2018	Hotel Transylvania 3: Summer Vacation	US$4,632,927	
35	September 2, 2018	Hotel Transylvania 3: Summer Vacation	US$2,673,028	
36	September 9, 2018	Mamma Mia: Here We Go Again!	US$1,239,003	
37	September 16, 2018	Mamma Mia: Here We Go Again!	US$785,973	
38	September 23, 2018	Incredibles 2	US$4,931,536	
39	September 30, 2018	Incredibles 2	US$2,884,388	
40	October 7, 2018	Venom	US$4,296,737	
41	October 14, 2018	A Star Is Born	US$1,972,734	
42	October 21, 2018	A Star Is Born	US$1,432,699	
43	October 28, 2018	Halloween	US$1,335,029	
44	November 4, 2018	The Nutcracker and the Four Realms	US$4,852,749	
45	November 11, 2018	The Nutcracker and the Four Realms	US$1,974,765	
46	November 18, 2018	Fantastic Beasts: The Crimes of Grindelwald	US$6,688,708	
47	November 25, 2018	Fantastic Beasts: The Crimes of Grindelwald	US$2,958,234	
48	December 2, 2018	Bohemian Rhapsody	US$6,127,405	
49	December 9, 2018	Bohemian Rhapsody	US$4,759,550	
50	December 16, 2018	Bohemian Rhapsody	US$2,717,632	
51	December 23, 2018	Mary Poppins Returns	US$3,211,028	
52	December 30, 2018	Mary Poppins Returns	US$3,733,920	
