= Jaime Jaramillo Arango =

Colombian professor of medicine and surgery

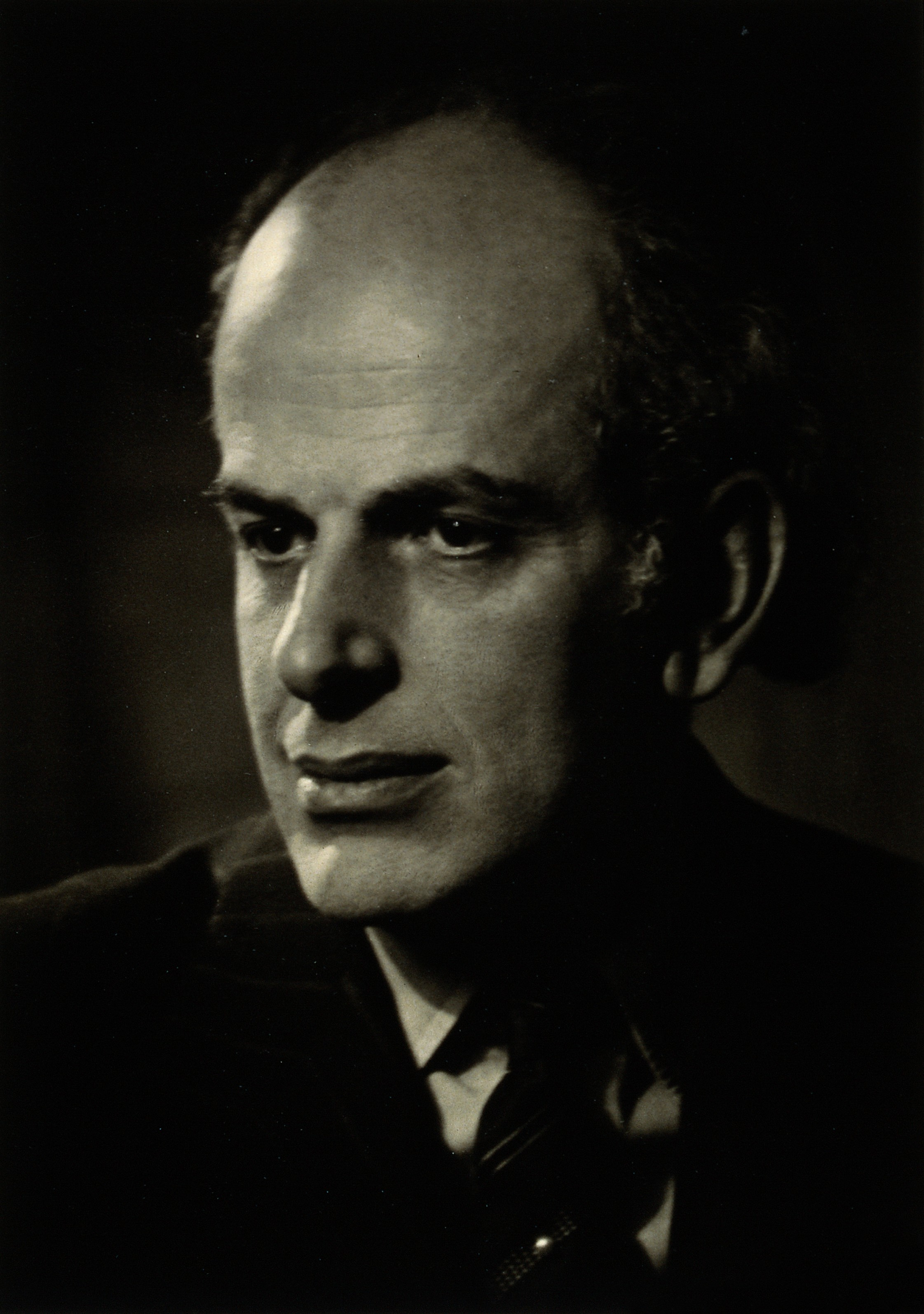

1st Colombian Ambassador 1939 - 1945 Colombia Ambassador to the United Kingdom
- In office June/July 1943 – December 9, 1945
- Monarch: George VI
- President: Alfonso López Pumarejo
- Succeeded by: Darío Echandía

Envoy Extraordinary and Minister Plenipotentiary of Colombia to the United Kingdom
- In office September 4, 1940 – 1943
- Monarch: George VI
- President: Eduardo Santos Montejo (1940–1942); Alfonso López Pumarejo (1943)
- Prime Minister: Winston Churchill

Permanent Delegate of Colombia to the League of Nations
- In office 1939–1940
- President: Eduardo Santos Montejo

Permanent Delegate of Colombia to UNESCO
- In office November 1, 1945 – December 9, 1945
- President: Alfonso López Pumarejo

Envoy Extraordinary and Minister Plenipotentiary of Colombia to Germany
- In office June 1938 – December 1938
- President: Alfonso López Pumarejo (Jun.-Aug.); Eduardo Santos Montejo (Aug.-Dec.)

Minister Plenipotentiary of Colombia to Denmark
- In office 1938–1945
- Monarch: Christian X
- President: Eduardo Santos Montejo (1938–1942); Alfonso López Pumarejo (1942–1945)

Minister Plenipotentiary of Colombia to the Governments-in-exile of Belgium, the Netherlands, Norway and Poland, based in London
- In office 1940–1945
- President: Eduardo Santos Montejo (1940–1942); Alfonso López Pumarejo (1942–1945)

Minister of National Education of Colombia
- In office May 29, 1934 – August 6, 1934
- President: Enrique Olaya Herrera

Rector of the National University of Colombia
- In office 1949–1950

Senator of Colombia
- In office 1951–1955

Personal details
- Born: January 17, 1897 Manizales, Colombia
- Died: July 30, 1962 (aged 65) Bogotá, Colombia
- Spouse(s): Carolina Cárdenas Núñez (m. 1932; died 1936) María José Nemry von Thenen de Jaramillo-Arango (m. 1948)
- Relatives: Virginia Vallejo (grandniece); Sergio Jaramillo Caro (grandnephew); Consuelo Salgar Jaramillo (grandniece)
- Education: National University of Colombia
- Occupation: Professor, politician, author, diplomat, surgeon
- Profession: Medicine, Surgery

Jaime Jaramillo Arango (January 17, 1897 – July 30, 1962) was a Colombian professor of medicine and surgery, author, diplomat, and politician. He was dean of medicine of the National University of Colombia and Director of the same institution in 1949-1950, pioneer of modern medicine, Minister Plenipotentiary in the Colombian foreign policy during the Second World War: 1938 - 1945, Minister of education in 1934, and founder of the Anglo Colombian School in 1956.

Professor Jaramillo Arango wrote several books of medicine and botany. The most important was "The British Contribution to Medicine" that studied the investigations and discoveries of several Nobel laureates: penicillin, by Alexander Fleming; malaria, by Ronald Ross; paludrine, by F. H. Curd, D. G. Davey, and F. L. Rose; vitamins, by Gowland Hopkins; and stilboestrol, by Robert Robinson and Charles Dodds. The foreword of Jaramillo's book was written by Sir Arthur MacNalty, British Chief Medical Officer of the British government.

Jaramillo Arango became the Permanent Delegate of Colombia to the League of Nations, and Permanent Delegate of Colombia to the First Assembly of the UNESCO in London, in November 1945, where he proposed the creation of the United Nations University. In 1973 the United Nations University, UNU, started to work as the academic research arm of the United Nations, with diplomatic status. Its missión was since the beginning to help human development and welfare through education.

== Family ==
Jaime Jaramillo Arango was born on January 17, 1897, in Manizales, Colombia. He was the son of Francisco Jaramillo Jaramillo and Dolores Arango Isaza. The family descended from Alonso Jaramillo de Andrade, from Extremadura, Spain.

== Education ==
Jaramillo Arango studied in the St. Thomas Aquinas School in Manizales, and in the St. Bartholomew Major College in Bogotá. He studied medicine in the National University of Colombia, and surgery in Paris, London, and Rochester, United States.

== Career ==
=== Pioneer of modern medicine ===
He returned to Colombia, and became the Director of the Hospital San Juan de Dios from 1920 to 1923, and from 1927 to 1931. He was the president and member of the board of directors of the institution in several occasions.

Due to his extensive studies and professional experience, he became a pioneer of the Colombian modern medicine, and the most eminent Colombian surgeon of his time. He was the primary doctor of three presidents of Colombia: Enrique Olaya Herrera, Alfonso López Pumarejo, and Eduardo Santos: and many personalities.

=== Professor, Rector and Minister ===
In the 1930s, he began his career in education: from 1933 to 1934, he was a professor and dean of medicine of the National University of Colombia; and, in 1934, president Enrique Olaya Herrera appointed him in 1934 as Minister of National Education. Rector of the National University of Colombia from 1949 to 1950.

=== Diplomatic figure ===
In 1938, the liberal president Alfonso López Pumarejo appointed Jaime Jaramillo Arango as Minister Plenipotentiary of Colombia to Germany. That year, he was assigned also as Minister Plenipotentiary, during World War Two, to the United Kingdom, from 1940 to 1945, and Minister Plenipotenciary to the governments in exile: Norway, Denmark, Belgium, Netherlands, and Poland, based in London.

=== Witness of the horrors of Kristallnacht ===
On August 2, 1938, Jaramillo Arango arrived in Berlin. The chosen date to present credentials as ambassador to Adolf Hitler was November 15. But, on November 9, the Nazi paramilitary squadrons began brutally attacking the Jewish population and their stores, known as Kristallnacht: the initiation of the open persecution of Jews by the Third Reich. The following day, November 10, Ambassador Jaramillo, and his assistant were arrested because they had been taking pictures of the impressive damage in Kurfürstendamm, from the diplomatic automobile. They were taken to the Ministry of Foreign Affairs, where they were released two hours later. Due to these events, Hitler cancelled the appointment with the Colombian diplomat.

Following Kristallnacht, on November 24, 1938, Jaramillo Arango left Germany and exiled himself, first in France, and then in England, where he was assigned as Minister Plenipotenciary to the United Kingdom until 1945. The Colombian embassy in Berlin was vacant from 1945 until 1953.

The official report of Ambassador Jaramillo appeared later in special articles and books about Kristallnacht; and the pictures taken that described the horror of the events on November 9, 1938, were exposed 75 years later in a commemorative exhibition in the New Synagogue of Berlin, in 2013.

=== Ambassador to the United Kingdom ===
In 1939, he headed the Colombian delegation to the League of Nations in Geneva, Switzerland, the actual United Nations. Amid the expansion of the Third Reich across Europe, president Eduardo Santos named him as Minister Plenipotentiary to Great Britain, from September 1940 to 1945. Jaime Jaramillo Arango suffered, too, the Blitz of the German bombing to London during World War II. He was appointed also as Minister Plenipotentiary to the Governments in Exile, Poland, Belgium, Denmark, the Netherlands, and Norway, based in the British capital. He became the first Colombian ambassador to the United Kingdom, from 1940 to December 19, 1945.

=== University of the United Nations ===
In November 1945, Jaramillo Arango was the Colombian delegate to the First Assembly of UNESCO in London, and was elected as vice president. He proposed the creation of the University of the United Nations, that started to work, after the war, in 1973.

In his speech, Ambassador Jaramillo Arango remembered the physical and spiritual famine in Europe, the teachers killed, and the buildings, universities and monuments destroyed during the war. He called for a rapid reconstruction and rehabilitation of Europe through a system of education and international cooperation. During the UNESCO First Assembly in 1945, his proposition was received with applause, and finally after the Second World War, in 1973, the United Nations University started to work.

=== National University of Colombia ===
After an intense diplomatic life, Jaramillo Arango returned to his country. From 1949 to 1950, he became the Rector of the National University of Colombia

=== Foundation of the Anglo Colombian School ===
In February 1956, due to his deep admiration for the British scientists and educators that had been his teachers and colleagues, professor Jaramillo Arango founded the Anglo Colombian School of Bogotá, an international, bilingüal, mixt-sex education, and intellectually plural school, inspired by the British educational system. To this day, it is one of the most prestigious academic schools of Colombia.

== Personal life ==
In 1932, Jaramillo married Carolina Cárdenas Núñez, a drafter and ceramist. Cárdenas died in 1936 from meningitis.

In 1948, he married María José Nemry von Thenen de Jaramillo-Arango (née Nemry von Thenen), a Belgian citizen. In 1954, Jaramillo-Arango and his wife opened the Mesón de Indias restaurant, the first international Colombian restaurant.

On July 30, 1962, Jaramillo died in Bogotá aged 65.

In 1998, Jaramillo-Arango works were co-translated: "The journals of Hipólito Ruiz, Spanish botanist in Peru and Chile, 1777-1788" which had been transcribed from the original manuscripts by Jaramillo.

== Selected works ==
Professor Jaramillo Arango wrote several books and articles about science, medicine and botany, in Spanish and English:

- 1948 – A propósito de algunas piezas inéditas de orfebrería Chibcha (About Some Unpublished Pieces of Chibcha Goldsmithing) Bogotá: Imprenta del Banco de la República.
- 1949 – A Critical Review of the Basic Facts in the History of Cinchona, published on dec. 23, 2008 in Botanical Journal of The Linnean Society., vol 53.)
- 1950 – The Conquest of Malaria London: William Heinemann Medical Books Ltd.
- 1952 – The Journals of Hipólito Ruiz, a Spanish botanist in Peru and Chile, 1777–1788. Transcribed to Spanish from the original manuscripts by Jaime Jaramillo Arango, and translated to English by Richard Evans Schultes and María José Nemry von Thenen Cambridge: Cambridge University Press, 1952 / 1998.
- 1953 - The British Contribution to Medicine. Foreword by Sir Arthur MacNalty London: E. & S. Livingstone Ltd.
- 1953 – Don José Celestino Mutis y las expediciones botánicas españolas del siglo XVIII al Nuevo Mundo (Don José Celestino Mutis and the Spanish Botanists Expeditions from the 18th Century to the New World) Separata de la Revista Bolívar, No. 9, 1952 / Separata de la Revista de la Academia Colombiana de Ciencias, Vol. VIII, Nos. 33 y 34, mayo de 1953.
- 1959 – Historia de los antibióticos. Bogotá: Editorial Pax.
- 1962 – Manual del árbol. Bogotá: Editorial Voluntad Ltda.
