= Death of Pablo Escobar =

1993 Colombian military operation in Medellín, Colombia

Coordinates: 6°15′13.6″N 75°35′52.4″W

- Part of the war on drugs and the Colombian conflict
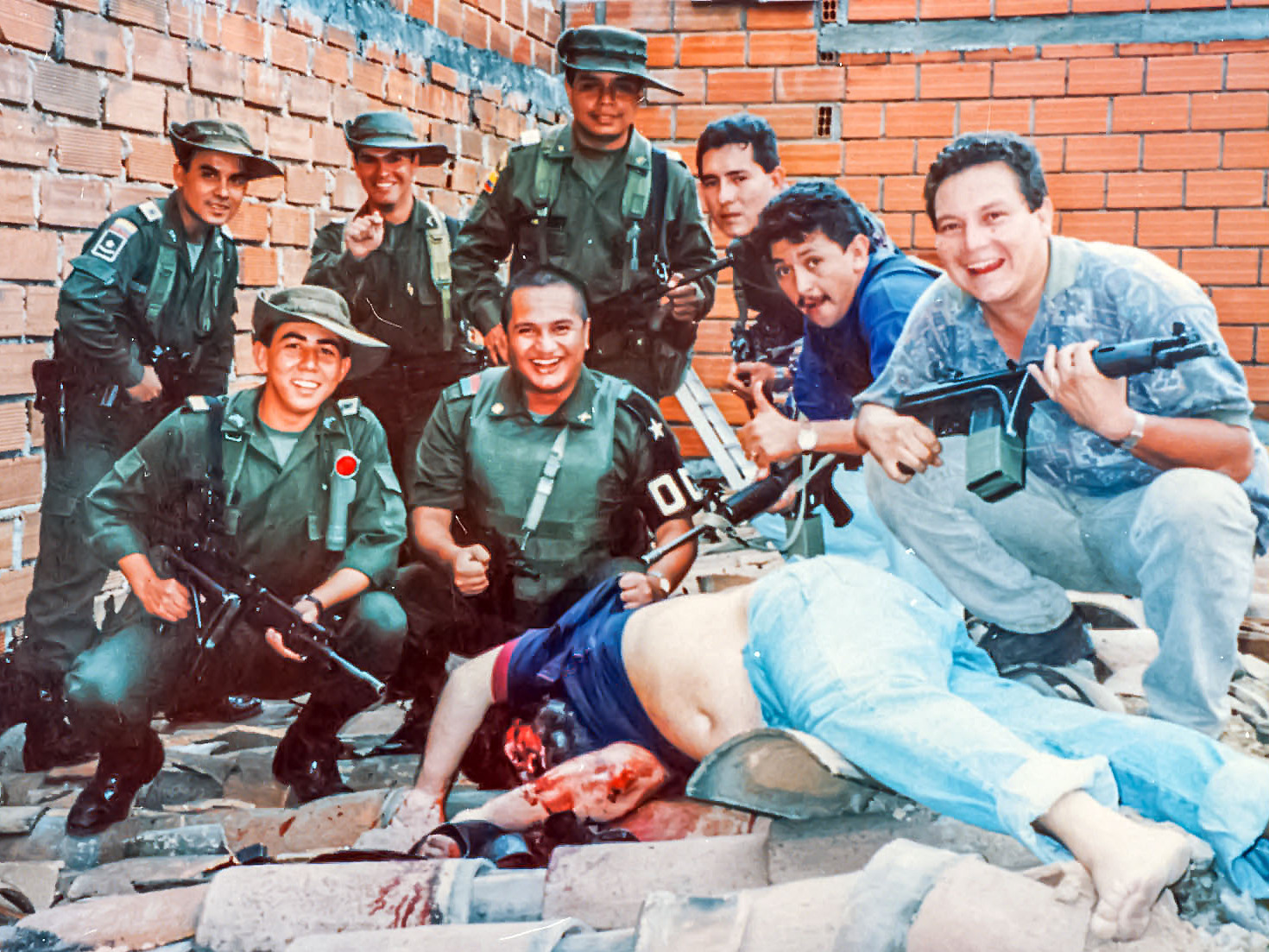
- Members of Search Bloc celebrate over Escobar's body. His death ended a 16-month search effort.
- Date: 2 December 1993; 32 years ago
- Venue: Medellín, Antioquia, Colombia
- Perpetrators: National Police of Colombia; Search Bloc

Pablo Escobar, the notorious leader of the Medellín Cartel, was killed on December 2, 1993, in Medellín, Antioquia, Colombia, by members of Search Bloc, the Colombian Special Forces. After months of evading capture, Escobar was finally located through a phone call to his family. He was shot while attempting to escape from a roof, with bullets striking his torso, feet, and head. The nature of the shooting sparked multiple conspiracy theories as to who actually killed Escobar. Despite leading a drug cartel, he was revered by locals and many attended his funeral.

== Events ==
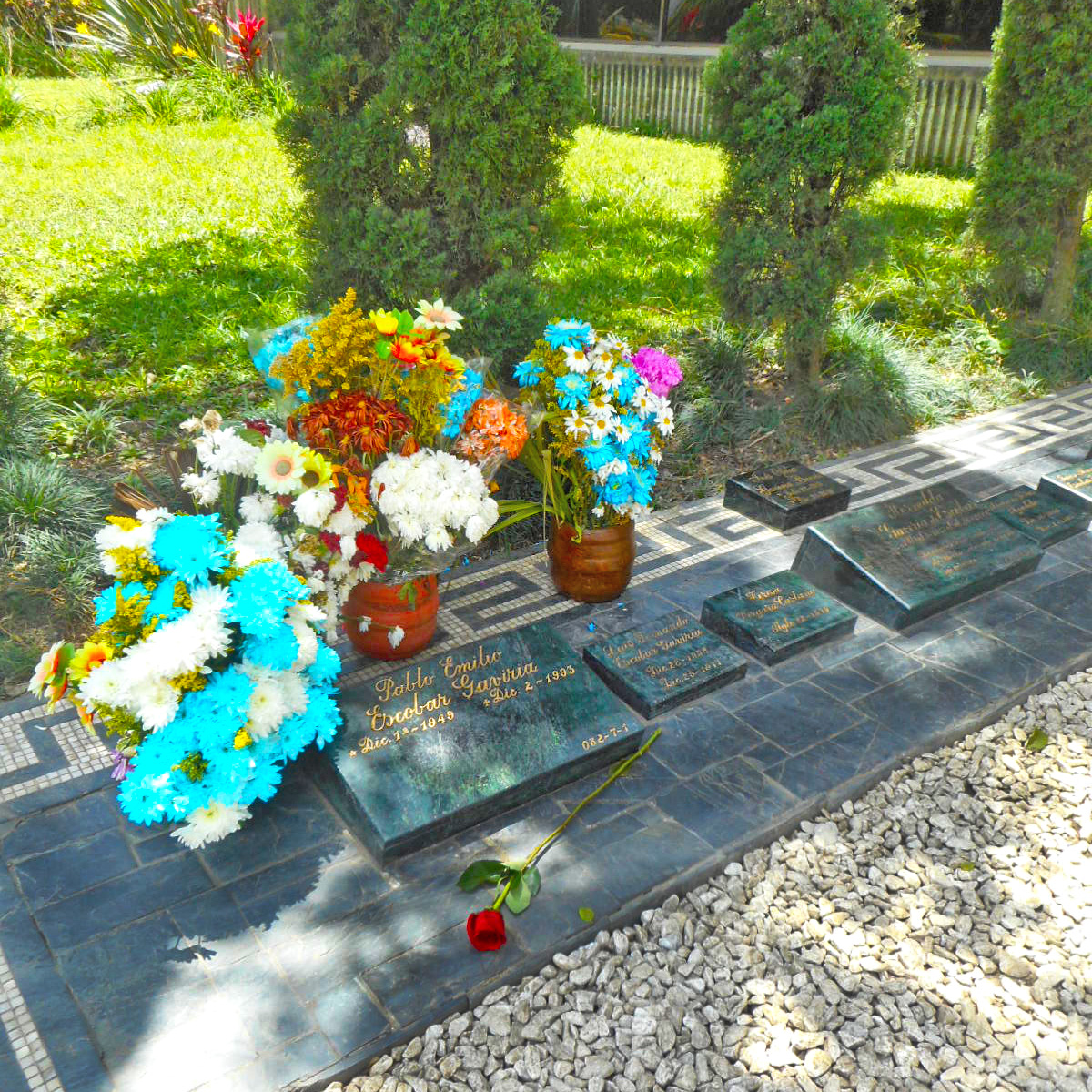
The tomb of Pablo Escobar and family in the Monte Sacro Cemetery, Itagüí

They will never catch me in my life, and from the jungle I'll order all of them to be killed, and in the long run, they'll be the ones who lose. (Note: Spanish: "Que a mí nunca en la gran puta vida me van a coger, y que yo desde la selva los mando matar a todos y a la larga los que van a perder van a ser ellos.")

— Audio intercepted of Escobar speaking in a threatening tone.

Although he managed to evade the Search Bloc for another 10 months, by October 1992, Escobar had lost all of his power; his last chief of bodyguards, 'El Angelito', was killed by the police on October 6 along with his brother, Álvaro Puerta. Escobar tried on several occasions to negotiate his surrender in exchange for safeguarding his family, but his proposal found no support in the government. His mother was the victim of several unsuccessful assassination attempts by Los Pepes; while Escobar's brother, Roberto, despite being in prison, was the victim of a letter bomb sent by the Pepes that left him blind in one eye.

Escobar faced threats from the Colombian police, the U.S. government and his rivals Los Pepes, and the Cali Cartel. For this reason Escobar attempted to get his family (his wife Victoria Henao and his children Juan Pablo along with his girlfriend Doria Andrea Ochoa, and his youngest daughter Manuela) out of the country; twice to the United States without any success, and finally to Europe with a stopover in Germany, but the German authorities were warned by both the Colombian police and the DEA (with two agents on board the plane), and they were all immediately deported back to Colombia. Upon arrival at El Dorado airport, the Escobar Henao family was taken into the custody of the Colombian authorities and confined to an apartment in the Hotel Tequendama Residences in the International Center of Bogotá, under strict police surveillance.

Knowing that the Tequendama Residences belonged to the Retirement Fund of the Military Forces, Escobar knew the phones were tapped. The government took advantage of Escobar's constant concern for his family, which they used as bait to locate him with French and British technology they had acquired with the help of the DEA, which not only identified the calls but also triangulated his location. Escobar also knew he could not spend more than two minutes making a call. When calling Residencias Tequendama he used to fake his voice, pretending to be a reporter, in order to be able to speak to his family. With no men or money, Escobar, who was already suffering from gastritis, tried to create a guerrilla movement called 'Antioquia Independiente', but instead preferred to make approaches to the FARC to become an accountant for the money from extortion and kidnappings, and for the drug trafficking business in which they had begun to venture a few years earlier. None of these initiatives came to fruition.

On December 1, 1993, Escobar celebrated his last birthday accompanied by his cousin Luzmila Gaviria, his mother and Álvaro de Jesús Agudelo 'Limón', the latter being his last bodyguard but who had previously been his brother Roberto's driver. The next day, on 2 December 1993, desperate, Escobar called his family again. Although in the previous days Escobar had been moving in a taxi accompanied by his bodyguard 'Limón' to avoid being located and calling for less than two minutes, Escobar remained inside the house, but that day he managed to avoid being located by speaking for less than two minutes. Following the same routine, Escobar continued calling pretending to be a journalist, but the second call went over two minutes, so he was immediately located. Escobar was found in a house in Los Olivos neighbourhood, a middle-class residential area of Medellín close to Atanasio Girardot Sports Complex by Colombian special forces, using technology provided by the United States, which allowed them to trace Escobar's location after he made a long call to his family. Police tried to arrest Escobar, but the situation quickly escalated to an exchange of gunfire. Escobar was shot in the torso, feet, and head while trying to escape from the roof. This sparked debate about whether he killed himself or was shot and killed. 'Limón' was also shot.

== Conspiracy theories ==
There are several hypotheses about his death:

- Escobar committed suicide by shooting himself below the right ear. This version coincides with the motto of Los Extraditables: "We prefer a grave in Colombia than a prison in the United States" and is the version defended by his family.
- A sniper from the group Los Pepes shot him.
- A DIJIN officer who was part of the Search Bloc shot him.
- A Delta Force (DF) sniper shot him.
- The coup de grace was fired by Colonel Hugo Heliodoro Aguilar, who led the assault group that arrived at the house.
- He was shot by Carlos Castaño Gil, the top leader of the United Self-Defense Forces of Colombia (AUC), according to a confession by a paramilitary named José Antonio Hernández, known by the alias John.

== Aftermath ==
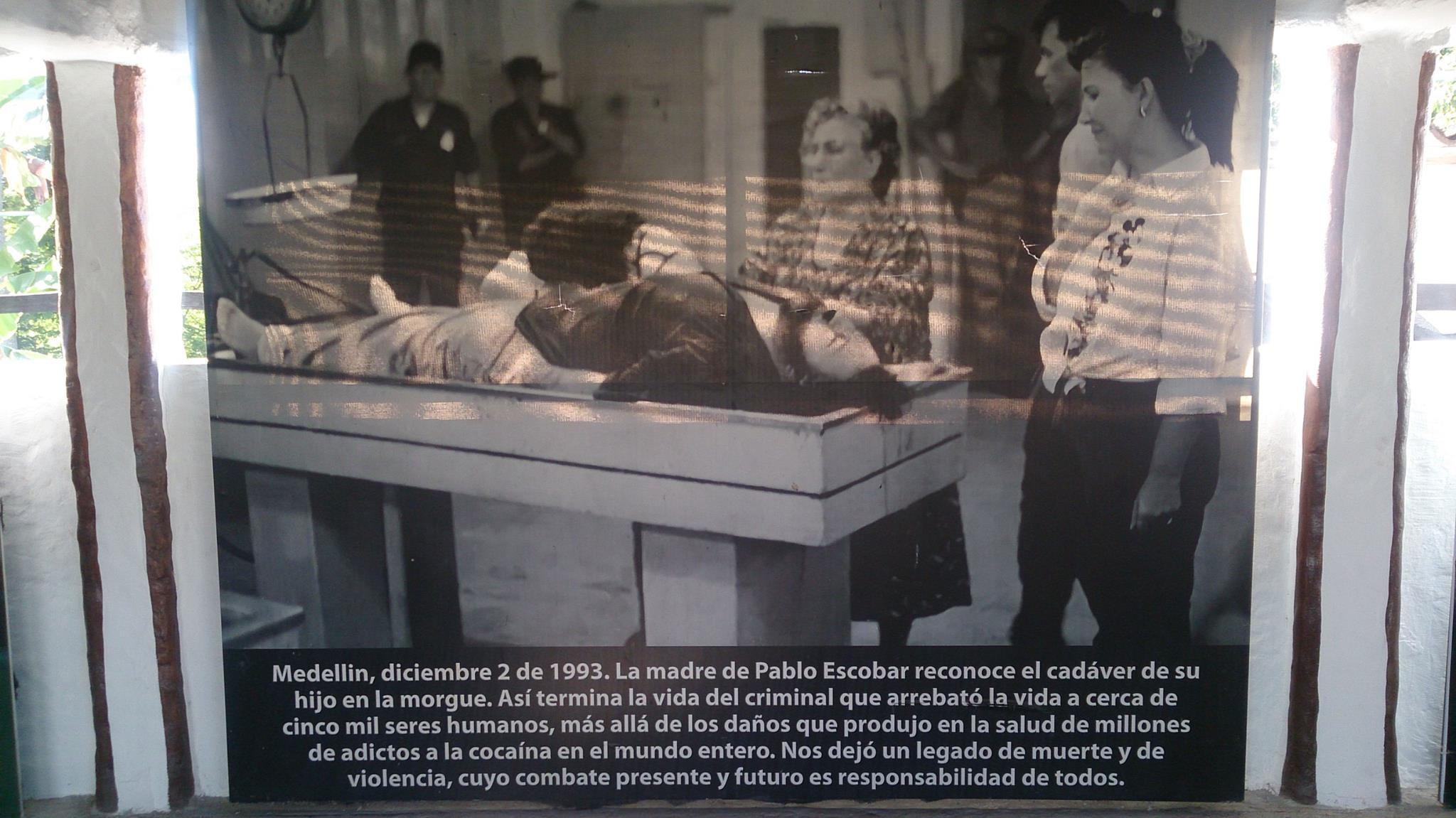
Body of Pablo Escobar at the Medellín morgue, with his mother and his son and wife paying their respects.

Escobar's death would lead to the subsequent fragmentation of the Medellín Cartel, while the cocaine market became dominated by the rival Cali Cartel until the mid-1990s when its leaders were either killed or captured by the Colombian government. The Robin Hood image that Escobar had cultivated maintained a lasting influence in Medellín. Many there, especially many of the city's poor whom Escobar had aided while he was alive, mourned his death, and over 25,000 people attended his funeral. Some of them consider him a saint and pray to him to receive divine help. Escobar was buried at the Monte Sacro Cemetery in Itagüí.

== See also ==
- Killing Pablo
- 2026 Jalisco operation
