= Killing Pablo =

Book by Mark Bowden

Killing Pablo: The Hunt for the World's Greatest Outlaw
- First edition
- Author: Mark Bowden
- Set in: Colombia
- Published: 2001
- Publisher: Atlantic Monthly Press
- Pages: 304
- ISBN: 978-0802123787

Killing Pablo: The Hunt for the World's Greatest Outlaw (2001) is a book by Mark Bowden that details the efforts by the governments of the United States and Colombia, their respective military and intelligence forces, and Los Pepes to stop illegal activities committed by Colombian drug lord Pablo Escobar and his subordinates. It relates how Escobar was killed and his cartel dismantled. Bowden originally reported this story in a 31-part series published in The Philadelphia Inquirer and in a companion documentary of the same title.

== Documentary ==
The True Story of Killing Pablo (2002) is a companion documentary film to Bowden's 2001 book. It was produced by Wild Eyes Productions for The History Channel.

== Film ==
A feature film adaptation was being developed by producers Bob Yari and Mark Gordon, to be directed and written by Joe Carnahan, but the film's producer, Yari, filed for bankruptcy in 2008. As of 2019, a film has yet to be produced.

== Appearances in pop culture ==
The book is featured in the eighth episode of the third season of Breaking Bad, when Walt Jr. shows it to his father – the camera zooms in on the book's cover – and describes it as an account of how Pablo Escobar was tracked down and killed by DEA agents like his Uncle Hank. In addition to Escobar, the series features the two DEA agents, Steve Murphy and Javier Peña, whom Bowden revealed to have been at the center of the hunt. It indirectly surfaces in the HBO series Entourage, when the actor at the center of that show, Vincent Chase, agrees to play Escobar in a film called Medellin despite being utterly unsuited to the role.
