= Universidad Autónoma Latinoamericana =

University in Medellín, Colombia

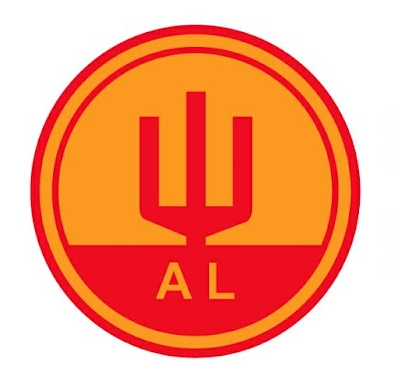
- Other name: UNAULA
- Motto: La Universidad del Centro
- Type: Private
- Established: September 16, 1966
- Rector: José Rodrigo Flórez Ruiz
- Students: 5,753
- Location: Carrera 55 A N° 49-51 Bloque Central, Medellín, Antioquia, Colombia
- Colors: Orange and red
- Website: www.unaula.edu.co

The Universidad Autónoma Latinoamericana (UNAULA, English: Latin American Autonomous University) is a Colombian private university, located in the center of Medellín, Antioquia, founded in 1966 by dissident students and professors from the Universidad de Medellín. A well known former student was Pablo Escobar.
