= Permanent Delegate of Colombia to the United Nations Educational, Scientific and Cultural Organization =

Permanent Delegate of Colombia to UNESCO
- Delegada Permanente de Colombia ante la UNESCO
- Incumbent; Sonia del Rosario Sarmiento Gutiérrez since 5 March 2009
- Style: Her Excellency
- Appointer: Juan Manuel Santos Calderón
- Inaugural holder: Jaime Jaramillo Arango
- Formation: 1 November 1945
- Salary: €6,030 (monthly)
- Website: Delegation's Website

The Permanent Delegate of Colombia to UNESCO is the Permanent Delegate of the Republic of Colombia to the United Nations Educational, Scientific and Cultural Organization.

The Delegate is Colombia's foremost diplomatic representative at the UNESCO, and Chief of Mission of the Colombian delegation to UNESCO in Paris. The officeholder however, is not the only high-ranking Colombian diplomat in France, the other one being the Ambassador of Colombia to France also in Paris. The officeholder is charged with representing the interests of the President and Government of Colombia in relation to the mission of UNESCO.
