= Doctor Dealer =

1987 true crime book by Mark Bowden

Doctor Dealer: The Rise and Fall of an All-American Boy and His Multimillion-Dollar Cocaine Empire
- First edition
- Author: Mark Bowden
- Language: English
- Genre: Nonfiction, true crime
- Published: 1987
- Publisher: Warner Books
- Publication place: USA
- Pages: 331
- ISBN: 9780802137579

Doctor Dealer: The Rise and Fall of an All-American Boy and His Multimillion-Dollar Cocaine Empire is a 1987 nonfiction true crime book by Mark Bowden, published by Warner Books. It was his first published book. It tells the story of dentist turned cocaine kingpin Larry Lavin.
