= Loving Pablo =

2017 film

- Film poster
- Directed by: Fernando León de Aranoa
- Screenplay by: Fernando León de Aranoa; Michael Zimbalist
- Based on: Loving Pablo, Hating Escobar by Virginia Vallejo
- Produced by: Dean Nichols; Javier Bardem; Miguel Menendez de Zubillaga; Kalina Kottas; Michael Zimbalist
- Starring: Javier Bardem; Penélope Cruz
- Cinematography: Alex Catalan
- Edited by: Nacho Ruiz Capillas
- Music by: Federico Jusid
- Release dates: 6 September 2017 (Venice); 9 March 2018 (Spain)
- Running time: 125 minutes
- Countries: Spain; Bulgaria
- Language: English
- Budget: €14.6 million
- Box office: $17.5 million

Loving Pablo, internationally known as Escobar, is a 2017 biographical crime drama film directed by Fernando León de Aranoa, based on Virginia Vallejo's memoir Loving Pablo, Hating Escobar. It was screened out of competition in the 74th Venice International Film Festival and in the Special Presentations section at the 2017 Toronto International Film Festival.

== Plot ==
Between 1981 and 1987, Colombian drug lord Pablo Escobar had a romantic relationship with the journalist and the television presenter, Virginia Vallejo.

== Cast ==
- Javier Bardem as Pablo Escobar
- Penélope Cruz as Virginia Vallejo
- Peter Sarsgaard as Shepard, based on Steve Murphy
- Julieth Restrepo as Maria Victoria Henao
- Óscar Jaenada as Santoro
- David Valencia as Santos
- David Ojalvo as FBI Agent
- Giselle Da Silva as Olguita Arranz

== Production ==
The film is a Spain-Bulgaria co-production by Escobar Films and & B2Y EOOD.

== Reception ==
=== Box office ===
Loving Pablo grossed $22,017 in the United States and Canada, and $17,5 million in other territories, plus $60,312 with home video sales.

=== Critical response ===
On review aggregator Rotten Tomatoes, the film holds an approval rating of 31% based on 48 reviews, with a weighted average rating of 4.82/10. The website's critical consensus reads, "Loving Pablo bungles its seemingly cinematic real-life story – and a pair of talented stars – in producing a lurid biopic that adds nothing to the Escobar subgenre." On Metacritic, the film has a weighted average score of 42 out of 100, based on 16 critics, indicating "mixed or average reviews".
