= Guests of the Ayatollah =

2006 book by Mark Bowden

Guests of the Ayatollah: The First Battle in America's War with Militant Islam
- First edition
- Author: Mark Bowden
- Language: English
- Genre: War; Historical non-fiction
- Publisher: Atlantic Monthly Press
- Publication date: April 25, 2006
- Publication place: United States
- Media type: Hardcover
- ISBN: 0871139251
- OCLC: 62738726

Guests of the Ayatollah: The First Battle in America's War with Militant Islam is a non-fiction work written by Mark Bowden.

Guests of the Ayatollah relates the events surrounding the Iran hostage crisis of November 4, 1979, to January 20, 1981, at the United States embassy in Tehran, Iran. The book explores the causes of the hostage-taking (mostly from the American perspective), commenting on the events which took place in the embassy. The book also describes the aftermath of the hostages' release following the onset of the Iran–Iraq War in September 1980.

The book was made into a Discovery Times Channel special. Bowden's son, Aaron Bowden, was the head writer on the TV project produced by Wild Eyes Productions. The television program first aired on June 26, 2006. There are four parts to the documentary: Takeover, Captivity, Rescue Mission and Endgame.

Bowden has signed an agreement with Paramount studios and producer Scott Rudin to allow a film adaptation of the book.
