= Mark Bowden =

American journalist and writer (born 1951)

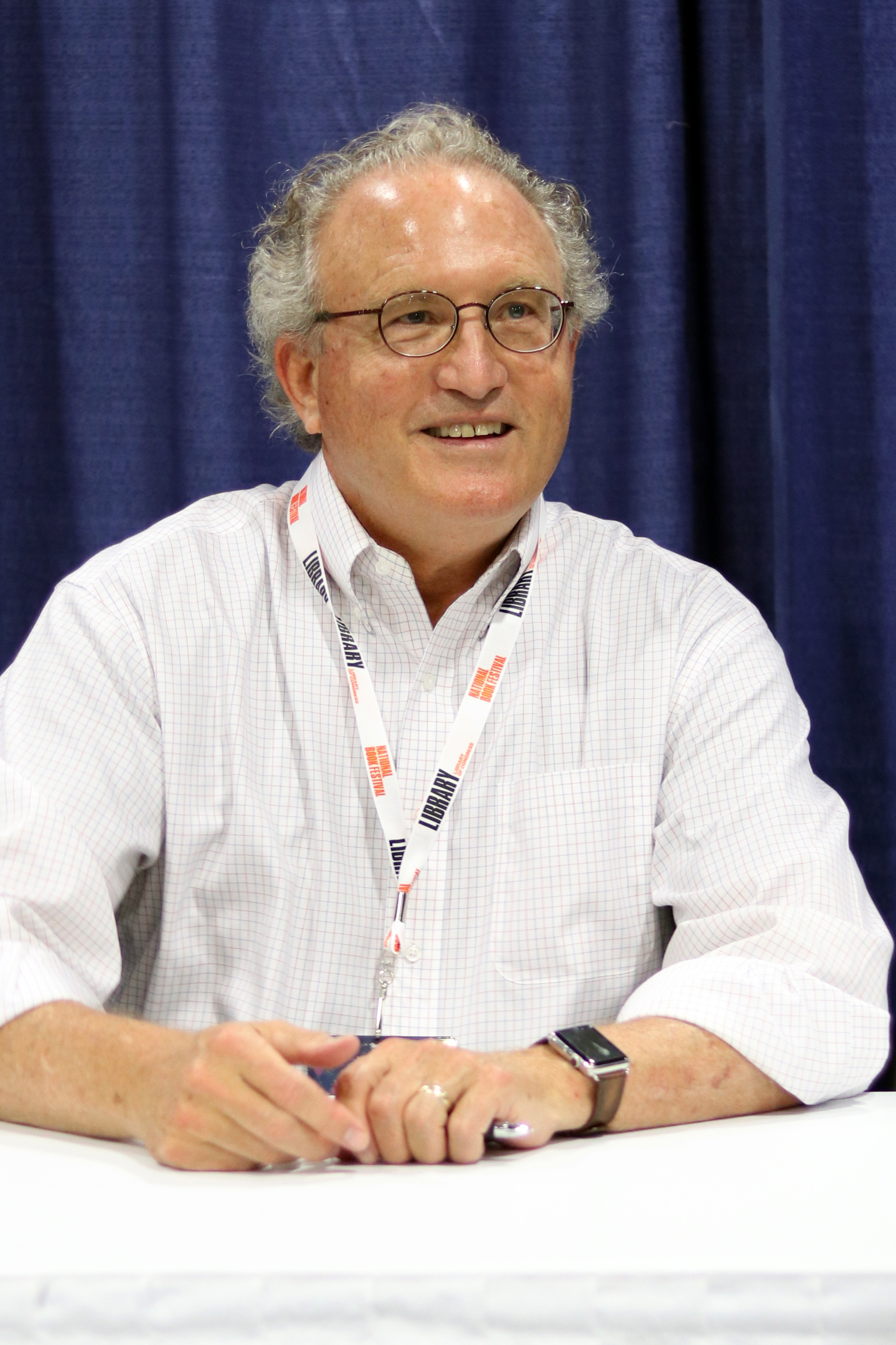
- Bowden in 2018
- Born: 1951 (age 74–75); St. Louis, Missouri, U.S.
- Education: Loyola University Maryland (BA)
- Occupations: Journalist; author
- Relatives: Bobby Bowden (first cousin once removed)
- Writing career
- Notable works: Black Hawk Down: A Story of Modern War; Hue 1968

Mark Bowden (/ˈbaʊdən/; born 1951) is an American journalist and writer. He is a former national correspondent and longtime contributor to The Atlantic. Bowden is best known for his book Black Hawk Down: A Story of Modern War (1999) about the 1993 U.S. military raid in Mogadishu, which was later adapted into a motion picture of the same name that received two Academy Awards.

Bowden is also known for the books Killing Pablo: The Hunt for the World's Greatest Outlaw (2001), about the efforts to take down Colombian drug lord Pablo Escobar, Guests of the Ayatollah and Hue 1968, an account of the Battle of Huế.

== Early life and education ==
Bowden was born in St. Louis, Missouri, in 1951. Former Florida State Seminoles football coach Bobby Bowden is his first cousin once removed. Bowden graduated from Loyola University Maryland in 1973 with a Bachelor of Arts degree in English literature. In college, he aspired to be a journalist after reading Tom Wolfe's book The Electric Kool-Aid Acid Test.

== Career ==
From 1979 to 2003, Bowden was a staff writer for The Philadelphia Inquirer. In that role he researched and wrote Black Hawk Down and Killing Pablo, both of which appeared as lengthy serials in the newspaper before being published as books. He published two books prior to these, Doctor Dealer and Bringing the Heat, both of which were based on reporting he originally did for the newspaper. He has since published twelve other books. Bowden wrote the 1997 Playboy profile of Donald Trump.

In July 2012, Vanity Fair published Bowden's article on the murder of Sherri Rasmussen entitled "A Case So Cold It Was Blue." Craig Silverman of the Poynter Journalism School wrote an extended analysis of disputed facts in the article, as first analyzed by the legal blog Trials & Tribulations. Silverman noted that Vanity Fair had posted a correction to the article, and that "the discrepancies [noted by Trials & Tribulations] don't amount to quote manipulation or a misrepresentation of what was said." Vanity Fair editor Cullen Murphy, in an e-mail to Poynter, said in part "the quotations used in Bowden's text correspond with relevant portions of the video. Some things are hard to make out, and there may be an occasional small variance, but a fair reading would conclude that the quotes track accurately and correctly capture the dynamic of the interrogation. There has been no distortion."

== Personal views ==
=== On coercive interrogation and torture ===
In the October 2003 issue of The Atlantic, Bowden's article "The Dark Art of Interrogation" advocated an official ban on all forms of "coercive" interrogation but argued that they should still be practiced in secret and should not necessarily be punished if revealed. Written more than a year before the violations of prisoners were revealed at Abu Ghraib and other detention centers, he wrote, in part:

The Bush Administration has adopted exactly the right posture on the matter. Candor and consistency are not always public virtues. Torture is a crime against humanity, but coercion is an issue that is rightly handled with a wink, or even a touch of hypocrisy; it should be banned but also quietly practiced. Those who protest coercive methods will exaggerate their horrors, which is good: it generates a useful climate of fear. It is wise of the President to reiterate U.S. support for international agreements banning torture, and it is wise for American interrogators to employ whatever coercive methods work. It is also smart not to discuss the matter with anyone.

If interrogators step over the line from coercion to outright torture, they should be held personally responsible. But no interrogator is ever going to be prosecuted for keeping Khalid Sheikh Mohammed awake, cold, alone, and uncomfortable. Nor should he be.

In The Men Who Stare at Goats by Jon Ronson, Bowden's article was noted as a reference to the CIA's Project ARTICHOKE. This program developed physical methods that can be used during interrogations and Ronson noted that they can be brutal or fatal.

=== Future of the media ===
Bowden believes that young people are just as drawn to "deep" journalism as other generations of people have been. He said in March 2009: "Nothing will ever replace language as the medium of thought, so nothing will replace the well-written, originally-reported story, or the well-reasoned essay."

== Publications ==
- Doctor Dealer. New York: Grand Central Pub. 1987. ISBN 978-0446513821.
- Bringing the Heat (1994; ISBN 0-679-42841-0)
- Black Hawk Down: A Story of Modern War. Atlantic Monthly Press. 1999. ISBN 978-0-87113-738-8.
- Killing Pablo: The Hunt for the World's Greatest Outlaw. New York: Atlantic Monthly Press. 2001. ISBN 978-0871137838.
- Our Finest Day: D-Day, June 6, 1944 (2002; ISBN 0-8118-3050-0)
- Finders Keepers: The Story of a Man Who Found $1 Million (2002; ISBN 0-87113-859-X)
- Road Work: Among Tyrants, Heroes, Rogues, and Beasts (2006; ISBN 0-87113-876-X)
- Guests of the Ayatollah: The First Battle in America's War with Militant Islam. New York: Atlantic Monthly Press. 2006. ISBN 978-0-87113-925-2. OCLC 62738726.
- The Best Game Ever: Giants vs. Colts, 1958, and the Birth of the Modern NFL (2008; ISBN 0-87113-988-X)
- Worm: The First Digital World War, (2011; ISBN 0-8021-1983-2); first covered by Bowden in "The Enemy Within", The Atlantic (June 2010).
- The Finish: The Killing of Osama bin Laden, (2012; ISBN 0-8021-2034-2)
- The Three Battles of Wanat and Other True Stories (2016; ISBN 978-0-8021-2411-1)
- Hue 1968: A Turning Point of the American War in Vietnam (2017; ISBN 978-0802127006)
- The Last Stone: A Masterpiece of Criminal Interrogation (2019; ISBN 978-0802147301)
- The Steal: Attempt to Overturn the 2020 Election and the People Who Stopped It, co-authored with Matthew Teague. (2022; ISBN 978-0-8021-5995-3)
- Life Sentence: The Brief and Tragic Career of Baltimore's Deadliest Gang Leader, (2023; ISBN 978-0802162427)

== Adapted for film ==
- Article "The Joey Coyle Story" was adapted as Money for Nothing (1993)
- Black Hawk Down (2001)
- The True Story of Killing Pablo (2002), adapted as a TV movie
- Essence of Combat: Making Black Hawk Down (2003) (video)
- The True Story of Black Hawk Down (2003) (TV)
- Guests of the Ayatollah, adapted as a 2006 TV movie
- Stalking Jihad, adapted as a 2007 TV movie
- Hue 1968: A Turning Point of the American War in Vietnam, to be adapted for a TV series on the Vietnam War, to be directed by Michael Mann
