= Colegio Los Nogales =

Private school in Bogotá, Colombia

- Bogotá; Colombia

Information
- Type: Private school
- Established: 1982

Colegio Los Nogales is a bilingual private school located in Bogotá, Colombia. It was founded on June 14, 1982.

== School profile ==
Founded in 1982, Colegio Los Nogales, a bilingual Colombian private, non-profit, coeducational, day school that teaches students from pre-kindergarten through eleventh grade. Its students are recognized for their strong values and their integrality, as well as their outstanding performances on Colombia's high school exit exam, known as the ICFES.

Its mission is to "Formar integralmente ciudadanos ejemplares, comprometidos con Colombia y líderes en el servicio a una sociedad cambiante, global y pluralista".

== Student body ==
There are ~ 1000 students enrolled in the school: ~200 in high school, ~300 in middle school and ~280 in elementary school and ~250 in kinder garden . The school celebrated its first senior class in June 1992; Los Nogales graduated its fourteenth class in June 2005.

== Curriculum ==
The elementary and middle school curriculum is taught in English and Spanish. English, Math, Science, and some Social Studies courses are taught in English, while other Social Studies courses, Religion, Physical Education, Music, some Art courses, Technology, and Spanish courses are taught in Spanish.

The high school curriculum meets rigorous requirements: four years each of mathematics, English, Spanish, social studies, physical education, religion, art; three years of French or Portuguese, depending on the student's choice; two semesters of physics, biology and chemistry. Electives are offered where students specialize in one or more areas, and choose from music (orchestra, marching band, and choir) drama, dance, and fine art (photography, sculpture, and oil painting). Most math and science classes are taught in English, while some social studies, Latin American and Spanish literature classes are taught in Spanish. As of this year, the school offers Advanced Placement (AP) courses in calculus, physics, English literature and composition, biology, microeconomics and macroeconomics, world history, chemistry, statistics, music theory, studio art, computer science, and Spanish language.

== Faculty and class size ==
All 150 faculty members hold university degrees in education and/or their field of specialty. The teaching staff is mainly Colombian. This year the school has more than 24 native English-speaking teachers, the majority of whom the school has recruited from North American universities. The average class size is 25 and the faculty/student ratio is 1:9.

== Community Service Program ==
Each junior and senior student participates in the school's community service program and must spend 50 hours per semester coordinating extra-curricular activities. Likewise, the school advises the overall administration of five low-income public schools in Bogotá.

== Accreditation ==
The school was recently accepted as a member of the NEASC (New England Association of Schools and Colleges) and CIS ( Council of International Schools ).

== Grading ==
Colegio Los Nogales uses an unweighted marking system. Letter grades are required for all courses: an AH (90–100) indicates excellent achievement, an H (80–89) indicates above average achievement, an S (70–79) indicates satisfactory achievement, an A (60–69) indicates a passing grade, while an I (59 and less) indicates insufficient understanding or performance, and need for remediation.

== House system ==
All students and faculties are assigned to one of three houses or clans. Each of the names of the houses have an essential meaning in Greek. Eudikia stands for Honesty, Politeia stands for Responsibility while Filia stands for Respect. Throughout the year, students participate in different contests in order to gain the necessary points to win the "Copa de las Casas". Among these activities are "Intercasas", a day where students and teachers compete both physically and mentally against each others, and "Candelazo", a Salsa dancing competition. Student behavior can also affect the "Copa de las Casas" score.

Each year, six students from 11th grade are selected to be House Captains (two Captains for each House). This designation is considered to be the greatest honor a student can have.

== Sports ==
Colegio Los Nogales has various sports facilities, which include basketball and volleyball courts, a hockey rink, and six playing fields. The school is a member of UNCOLI - International School Association in Bogotá, and competes in several sports: football, basketball, volleyball, track and field, gymnastics, table tennis, and chess.
