= Alberto Santofimio =

Colombian politician involved in the election of Pablo Escobar in Congress

Alberto Santofimio Botero

Colombian Minister of Justice
- In office August 7, 1974 – July 10, 1975
- President: Alfonso López Michelsen
- Preceded by: Jaime Castro Castro
- Succeeded by: Samuel Hoyos Arango

Personal details
- Born: June 17, 1942 (age 84) Ibagué, Tolima, Colombia
- Party: Liberal
- Spouse(s): Constanza Hernández (1968–1977); Marcie Marcantoni; Liliana Jaramillo Calero
- Children: Alberto Santofimio Hernández; Emilio Santofimio Jaramillo; Sandy Santofimio
- Education: Our Lady of the Rosary University
- Profession: Lawyer

Alberto Santofimio Botero (born June 17, 1942) is a Colombian politician, a member of the Colombian Liberal Party.

== Biography ==
He has been Minister of Justice, a two-time presidential candidate and a Senator. He was considered to be a sure bet for president in 1982, but he decided to let his boss, Alfonso López Michelsen who had been president from 1974 to 1978, run for reelection. In the 1990s, Santofimio was involved in the campaign Process 8000 as head of the Liberal Party in Tolima Department as that party's office was accused of receiving money from companies part of an investigation in order to support the campaign for the presidency of Colombia for Ernesto Samper.

== Accusations and sentences ==
He was part of the 1990 pool of candidates for the presidency in the Liberal Party. After the assassination of another candidate, Luis Carlos Galán, he and the other members of the National Directive of the Liberal Party, decided to support César Gaviria, the campaign manager of Galán to be the sole Liberal Party candidate in 1990.

During the investigations about the assassination of Luis Carlos Galán, Santofimio was mentioned as a rumour that he and other former presidencial candidates could have been involved in reference to influencing the crime. But he was cleared by the Attorney General and cousin of the assassinated candidate of any wrongdoing. Unfortunately for former Minister and Senator Santofimio, after 17 years a known criminal, Jhon Jairo Velásquez a.k.a. "Popeye" and one of Medellin Cartel's Drug lords Pablo Escobar's lieutenants- in jail for most of his life, changed his original testimony given years before where he said Santofimio had nothing to do with the crime. However, Popeye decided to change his version, stating that perhaps Santofimio had influenced.

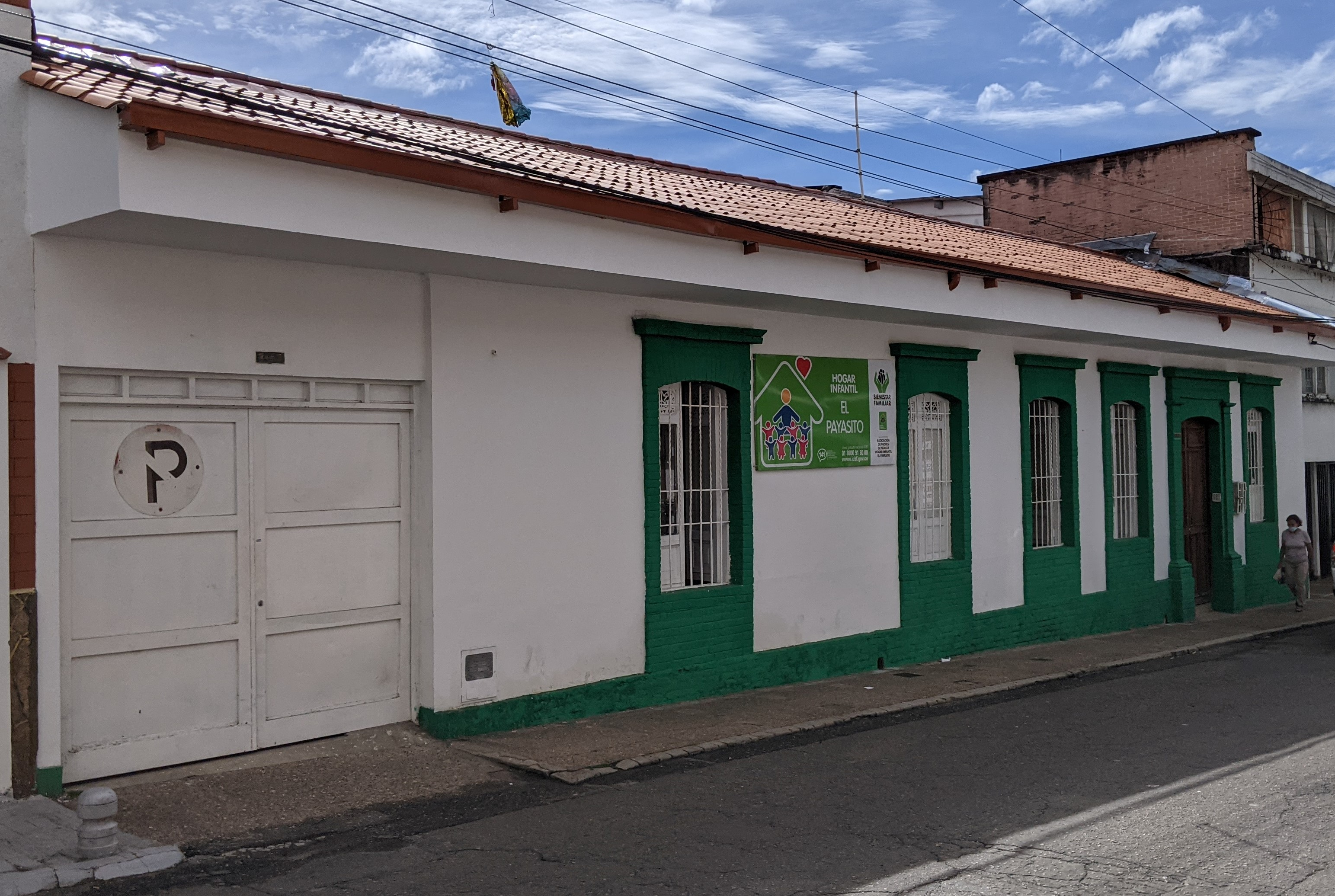
House of the Santofimio Botero family, Ibagué, Colombia

On May 12, 2005, the investigation over Santofimio's role in the assassination of Galán started again, and he was arrested after new evidence surfaced. In October 2007 he was found guilty and sentenced to 24 years in prison. His attorneys immediately appealed the case before the State Supreme Court, the Tribunal Supremo de Justicia de Cundinamarca.

A year later, in October 2008, a panel of 3 State Supreme Court Justices, citing lack of substantial evidence against the accused, overthrew the original judge's decision, and order Santofimio freed. The Court added that the credibility of the only witness against the accused, a hired assassin of Pablo Escobar's known as "Popeye," was highly controversial because he was a well-known criminal who had stated for 17 years, in various investigations, that Santofimio had nothing to do with the crime, and then had suddenly recanted his testimony.

On August 31, 2011, however, the Colombian Supreme Court voided the State's Supreme Court decision and ratified the original sentence. The Court ordered Alberto Santofimio Botero's detention; he is now accused of being an influential part in the killing not only of Luis Carlos Galán, but also two other victims – Julio Cesar Peñaloza and Santiago Cuervo, who were gunned down along with Galán.

In August 2018, he was put under investigation following allegations of involvement in the assassination of Rodrigo Lara Bonilla.

=== Conditional liberty ===
On March 25, 2020, Santofimio was placed on probation after serving three quarters of his sentence and in consideration of his age, vulnerable to COVID-19.

== See also ==
- Luis Carlos Galán. Colombian politician
