= Clan del Golfo =

Colombian neo-paramilitary drug cartel

Gulf Clan
- Clan del Golfo
- Flag of the AGC
- Other name: Gaitanist Army of Colombia (Ejercito Gaitanista de Colombia)
- Leaders: Daniel Rendón Herrera, alias "Don Mario" (imprisoned); Carlos Mario Úsuga, alias "Cuarentano" (imprisoned); Gustavo Adolfo Álvarez Téllez, alias "Tavo" or "Gordo" (imprisoned); Juan de Dios Úsuga David, alias "Giovany" †; Dario Antonio Úsuga David, alias "Otoniel" (imprisoned); Jobanis de Jesús Ávila Villadiego, alias "Chiquito Malo"
- Dates active: 2001–present
- Headquarters: Urabá region, Antioquia, Colombia
- Active regions: Colombia, Venezuela, smuggling cells and networks in Spain and the United States
- Ideology: Anti-Communism
- Size: 7,000
- Wars: Colombian armed conflict

The Clan del Golfo ("The Gulf Clan"), also known as the Gaitanist Self-Defense Forces of Colombia (Autodefensas Gaitanistas de Colombia; AGC) or Gaitanist Army of Colombia (Ejército Gaitanista de Colombia; EGC) and formerly called Los Urabeños and Clan Úsuga, is a prominent Colombian neo-paramilitary group and currently the country's largest drug cartel.

The AGC is one of the most powerful criminal organizations in Colombia. The crime syndicate recruits its members mainly from former right-wing paramilitaries and is estimated to have around 6,000 men under arms. In addition to drug trafficking, the AGC is also involved in illegal mining and racketeering and is responsible for countless homicides and extortion incidents. It is based in the Urabá region of Antioquia, and is involved in the Colombian armed conflict.

The AGC is one of the organizations that appeared after the demobilization of the United Self-Defense Forces of Colombia (AUC). In late 2011, the AGC declared war on Los Rastrojos over control of the drug trade in Medellín. Their main source of income is cocaine trafficking, as they appear to be the largest distributors of cocaine in Colombia. As of late 2021, it is considered the most powerful criminal organization in Colombia, having some 3,000 members in the inner circle of the organization in 2016, with its current numbers unknown. Its rivals include the National Liberation Army (ELN). The AGC has recruited accomplices at the highest level of the military hierarchy, such as generals and colonels.

Made up of former mid-level paramilitary leaders, the AGC has increased homicide rates in Colombia's northern departments. It is considered the more ambitious and ruthless of Colombia's major drug trafficking organizations (DTOs). The group's power base is currently in the Antioquia, Sucre and Córdoba Departments, with a presence in various other departments and regions in the country, including major cities such as Medellín and Bogotá. The AGC is likely the largest distributor of cocaine in the world, having formed direct partnerships with drug cartels in Mexico and European crime groups, such as 'Ndrangheta and the Albanian mafia, who profit from the illegal cocaine trade with the AGC.

In June 2020, the National Police of Colombia announced that former Los Rastrojos member Marlon Gregorio Celis Caballero, aliases "Loquillo" or "Felipe," had become the new leader of the Clan del Golfo by April 2020. At the time of this revelation, the Clan del Golfo reduced its drug trafficking route to the Caribbean region and also named a Ciénaga native with the alias "Diana" as the new head trafficker. However, the Clan del Golfo has also been distracted by a direct conflict with FARC dissidents. On October 23, 2021, the group's leader Dario Antonio Úsuga, better known as Otoniel, was captured. At the time of his arrest, Otoniel was Colombia's most wanted drug lord. Following the arrest of Otoniel, then President of Colombia Iván Duque described the weakened Clan del Golfo as "over" and claimed that "its days are numbered." As of August 2025, the cartel is led by Jobanis de Jesús Ávila Villadiego, alias "Chiquito Malo", and reportedly has 7,000 members.

== Origins ==
For the Clan del Golfo, originally named "Los Urabeños" (the denonym of Urabá), the northwestern region near the Colombia–Panama border is highly prized for drug trafficking, as it offers access to the Caribbean and Pacific coast from the departments of Antioquia and Chocó. However, the origins of the group can be traced elsewhere to Colombia's Eastern Plains, where Daniel Rendón Herrera, better known as "Don Mario," once handled finances for the paramilitary group Bloque Centauros.

Cocaine traffickers had long competed with the Revolutionary Armed Forces of Colombia (FARC) for territory and influence in the Eastern Plains. In 1997, top paramilitary commanders Carlos and Vicente Castaño began sending troops to the area to co-opt the drug business from the guerrillas. In 2001, the Castaños sold one of their armed groups, later known as Bloque Centauros, to another warlord, Miguel Arroyave, allegedly for US$7 million. It was Arroyave who convinced Rendón Herrera to come work for him. Under Rendón's supervision, the Centauros became one of the wealthiest factions within the United Self-Defense Forces of Colombia (Autodefensas Unidas de Colombia – AUC). The Centauros trafficked cocaine, propped up local politicians, extorted ranchers and farmers, and collected security taxes for products ranging from alcohol to petroleum.

However, the Centauros soon began clashing with a rival paramilitary group, the Peasant Self-Defense Forces of Casanare (Autodefensas Campesinas del Casanare – ACC). The ACC is one of the oldest vigilante groups in Colombia, headed by Héctor Germán Buitrago Parada, alias "Martín Llanos." It was allegedly ACC fighters who first began calling the Centauros "those from Urabá," "Paisas," or "Urabeños," all references to the Antioquia region where many of the paramilitaries hailed from.

By 2004, the war between the ACC and the Centauros had left an estimated 3,000 people dead. Rendón fled the Eastern Plains in June after a falling out with Arroyave. Rendón then found refuge in the Urabá region, where his brother Freddy, alias "El Aleman," headed his own paramilitary group, the Bloque Elmer Cardenas. Shortly afterward, Arroyave was ambushed and killed by his former allies, including Pedro Oliverio Guerrero, alias "Cuchillo."

When Freddy Rendón chose to demobilize in 2006, his brother "Don Mario" seized the opportunity to expand his drug trafficking operations in the Urabá gulf. He recruited many of the fighters once under Freddy's command, as well as ex-members from the defunct AUC. From Urabá, the DTO deployed go-fast boats loaded with cocaine to Central America or the Caribbean, with some estimates putting it at 10 to 20 boats per week. By 2008, Rendón Herrera was one of the richest and most-wanted traffickers in Colombia.

As the AUC blocs were officially demobilized, this new paramilitary groups called themselves Gaitanist Self-Defense Forces or Don Mario's Black Eagles in an attempt to legitimize their actions.

Rendón attempted to expand his empire, moving into southern Córdoba, the Lower Cauca region in northern Antioquia and even venturing into Medellin, long controlled by the Oficina de Envigado. Rendón's men soon began clashing with the Paisas, then a rural, armed wing of the Oficina. Police attributed at least 3,000 homicides to Rendón's organization between 2007 and 2009. On April 15, 2009, a team of 200 police commandos captured Rendón on a farm in rural Urabá.

Since Rendón's capture, the remnants of his organization had fallen under the control of the Usuga-David brothers, Juan de Dios and Dario Antonio, two former mid-ranking paramilitaries believed to have worked with Rendón since the 1990s. The two started with an estimated 250 men following Rendón's arrest and have since managed to grow exponentially.

On January 1, 2012, Juan de Dios Usuga-David, alias "Giovany," was killed in a police raid on a ranch in the Chocó department. Three Clan del Golfo members with him were injured and arrested during the shootout with the police as well. In a display of strength, the Clan del Golfo organized a series of coordinated strikes protesting his death in northern Antioquia, handing out fliers which referred to the group's former name, the Gaitanista Self-Defense Forces. Clan del Golfo also signaled their intention to respond aggressively to their leader's death when they publicly offered a $1,000 reward for each police officer killed in Antioquia, a public relations strategy best associated with kingpin Pablo Escobar. His brother Dario Antonio Úsuga David, alias "Otoniel," afterward succeeded him as head of the cartel. On October 23, 2021, Otoniel was apprehended by Colombian military forces.

They take their name from Jorge Eliécer Gaitán, a former Colombian activist leader.

== Territory and presence ==
According to a November 2021 InsightCrime report, the Clan del Golfo reportedly has a strong presence in the Colombian departments of Antioquia, Córdoba and Sucre, a moderate presence in the departments of Cauca, Valle del Cauca, Chocó, Nariño, Bolívar, Atlántico, Magdalena, Norte de Santander, and a low or minimal presence in the departments of Cesar, Santander, Boyacá, La Guajira, Risaralda, Casanare, Meta, and Vichada.

On March 14, 2024, an unnamed alleged member of Clan del Golfo was arrested by USBP agents in El Paso, Texas.

== Organization and structure ==
The Clan del Golfo relies on at least 1,200 members in their top level of command. Their base is near and around the Urabá gulf, including the Tierralta and Valencia municipalities in Cordoba and the eleven municipalities in the Urabá sub-region in Antioquia. The arrest of Urabá regional leader Eduardo Ortiz Tuberquia, alias "El Indio," in May 2017 and the deaths of second-in-command, Roberto Vargas Gutiérrez, alias "Gavilán," in September 2017 and military boss Luis Orlando Padierma, alias "Inglaterra," in November 2017 gave overall leader Dario Antonio Úsuga David, alias "Otoniel," tenuous authority over the Clan del Golfo, with regional leaders gaining more direct authority over their territories.

The top command deploys teams of trained, armed men to rural areas vital for drug-trafficking operations. These include zones with natural seaports along the Caribbean coast or areas where coca base must be bought, like Caucasia or Tarazá in Antioquia (InSight has also heard reports of a Urabeño cell in Medellín). These cells then attempt to recruit local informants, especially collaborators who can inform them of the actions of the security forces.

Clan del Golfo are also known to contract local street gangs, who help with the retail and mid-level distribution of cocaine, extortion, and select assassinations. By "sponsoring" other low-level gangs, this group has been able to maintain small, select cells of highly experienced men in the field, responsible for ever-larger swathes of territory. There are also indications that the group has been successful enough in terms of recruitment to move into other key territories like Barrancabermeja, Santander, one of Colombia's oil towns long prized by the Rastrojos.

When it comes to drug trafficking, the Clan del Golfo are similar to rival DTOs, like the Rastrojos or the Paisas, in that they are uninterested in controlling the entire chain of drug production. However, they have not proved as adept as the Rastrojos when it comes to brokering key alliances with other major players in the drug trade. Clan del Golfo will buy coca base from the FARC, but the two groups will not collaborate much further than that. Military discipline is a key factor that makes Clan del Golfo a competive organization so far: they have proved immune to the kind of infighting tearing apart the Paisas or the Oficina. Clan del Golfo may yet prove capable of expanding their operations beyond the Caribbean coast and northern Colombia, if they are not handcuffed by their war with the Rastrojos.

The organization has emerged from paramilitarism and continues to specifically target political parties, unions, and leftist associations. It is one of the main perpetrators of selective assassinations of community and social leaders, leftist political activists and forced displacement of people. In October 2017, it published a pamphlet entitled "Pistol Plan against the Patriotic Union" in which it threatened members of this political party or NGOs with death.

On September 1, 2017, the second-in-command of the Clan del Golfo (alias "Gavilán") was killed during a shootout with police. Inglaterra, who was the group's fifth in command, was injured during this shootout as well and later died in November 2017. Later, Aristides Meza, who served as third-in-command, was killed during a shootout with police on March 28, 2018. A successor who used the alias "Samuel" was later arrested on May 21, 2018, while Nicolás was arrested on August 6, 2018. In October 2018, it was reported that as a result of the deaths and arrests of these three senior leaders within a year of either each other, Clan del Golfo saw a major reorganization in its leadership, with Giovanis Ávila Villadiego, alias "Chiquito Malo," reportedly being the main person in charge of maritime trafficking routes to the United States and Europe; Nelson Darío Hurtado Simanca, alias "Marihuano," in command of the Central Urabá Bloc (Bloque Central Urabá) and some 700 men in the Caribbean sub-region; and other commanders of regional blocs.

In August 2019, the cartel's chief financier Carlos Mario Úsuga, also known as "Cuarentano," was arrested. He was another brother of Otenial and was reported to have taken over the cartel's financial operations following the arrest of their sister, Nini Johana, in December 2013. Two other brothers of Otoniel, Angel Eusebio and Fernando Umbeiro Úsuga, were also arrested in 2018. Cuarentano was revealed to have been in charge of the cartel's trafficking routes and oversaw Chiquito Malo's trafficking as well. Additionally, rather than Chiquito Malo, fellow Cuarentano-employed trafficker Darío Úsuga Torres, alias "Pueblo," was named by Colombian police as Cuarentano's most likely successor. Both Pueblo, who is an Úsuga family relative, and Ciquito Malo were high ranking on the list of potential successors to Cuarentano. However, by the time she was re-arrested on March 17, 2021, Nini Johana was once again managing the Clan del Golfo's illicit finances resulting from narco-trafficking and money laundering.

Between January and August of 2019, Colombian police reported 339 captures and nine members killed in Public Force operations. In addition, they reported the seizure of 12.6 tons of cocaine hydrochloride which, according to the authorities, leads to close the fence over the heir to a structure that spread throughout the country. Members of Clan del Golfo who served as liaisons with other Colombian drug cartels were among those arrested. The cartel was also estimated to have been reduced to only 1,500 armed men. By August 2019, 16 members of the Úsuga family had also been arrested in less than a six-year period. In December 2019, senior Clan del Gulfo drug trafficker and money launderer Joaquin Guillermo David-Usuga was extradited from Colombia to Houston, Texas in the US.

In March 2020, Marihuano was revealed to be living in the Darién Jungle in cabins he built himself. His police record was also made public, which revealed that he had court documentation despite still being wanted. It was also suggested that his role in the cartel was slightly exaggerated, and that while he was heavily involved in the cartel and serving as the cartel's No. 2, he was more of a regional leader in the Colombian areas of Riosucio, Juradó, Unguía and Acandí than an international trafficker, extending only as far as the Panama border, and is the leader of close to 1,000 members of the cartel's Colombian armed forces. He is wanted not only for drug trafficking, but also numerous atrocities in the departments of Córdoba, Antioquia and Chocó and has a bounty of up to 580 million pesos for his capture. On April 25, 2020, cartel leader Gustavo Adolfo Álvarez Téllez, who was one of Colombia's most wanted drug lords and also had a bounty of up to 580 million pesos for his capture, was arrested at his lavish estate in Cereté while holding a party under quarantine during the COVID-19 pandemic. Álvarez was described as the "brain" of the cartel and by this point was reported to have taken charge of the cartel's Caribbean operations.

On May 4, 2020, leader of the cartel's violent Jorge Iván Arboleda Garcés’ fraction, Aureliano Pérez Caballero, alias "Dávinson," was arraigned in court following his arrest the previous day. On May 27, 2020, the leader of the cartel's Carlos Vazquez fraction, identified as "Fabian," and seven of his associates were arrested. On May 29, 2020, the Carlos Vazquez fraction's weapons supplier Jhon Olmedo Ramirez, alias "Guajiro," was captured along with 9,000 rifle cartridges, a van, 10 suppliers of long-range weapons, and 2 cell phones. On May 28, 2020, notorious Clan del Golfo hitman, Yelson Andres Mes Perez, alias "Yeisito," and a woman arrested with him were jailed.

On June 8, 2020, three Clan del Golfo members who were planning to kill civilians in Chocó were arrested. On June 12, 2020, Urabá police arrested alleged Clan del Golfo member Alexander Asprilla, alias "Perea." Perea was suspected of being involved in selective killings in the municipalities of Bahía Solano, Nuquí, Juradó, as well as other townships and villages of the area. On June 13, 2020, it was revealed that 26 Clan del Golfo members were arrested in Santa Marta. Among those detained were local leaders thought to be responsible for a wave of recent violence. It was also revealed that 48 Clan del Golfo members, including 5 local leaders, had been detained in Santa Marta since the beginning of 2020.

On June 23, 2020, the Colombian National Police revealed in a national radio broadcast that, shortly before the arrest of Téllez, a former member of the rival Los Rastrojos criminal group, Marlon Gregorio Celis Caballero, alias "Loquillo" or "Felipe," was named "as the new leader of the Gulf Clan." An operative from Ciénaga with the alias "Diana" was also named as head of the cartel's financial operations, money laundering, and drug trafficking operations. Under Loquillo's leadership, the Clan del Golfo concentrated its criminal actions on the Caribbean Trunk, especially in Santa Marta and the surrounding municipalities of the Magdalena department, using new platforms large cocaine shipments through boats that dock near the municipalities of Magdalena in Pueblo Viejo and Ciénaga. On June 26, 2020, it was revealed that the Clan del Golfo had started a direct conflict with FARC dissidents called Operation Mil and dispatched 1,000 of its paramilitaries from Urabá, southern Córdoba, and Chocó to remove FARC dissents from northern Antioquia and control the entire municipality of Ituango.

On September 19, 2020, The Economist described the Clan del Golfo as now a group "composed of demobilized right-wing paramilitaries." On October 8, 2020, it was revealed that El Soldado was killed in the course of military operations in the Antioquia region of Lower Cacua. Prior to his death, El Soldado was serving as the leader of the Julio César Vargas substructure of the Clan del Golfo. In addition to the Colombian military killing El Soldado, the Colombian National Police confirmed the arrests of 13 members of Clan del Golfo's "Héroes del Caribe," which served a cell of the cartel's Self-Defense Forces of Colombia, in Cartagena. Among those arrested includes regional Clan del Golfo leader Edwin Enrique Caballero Santander, known under the alias of El Brother. At the time, it was also revealed that military operations which had been carried out in the Colombian regions of Antioquia, Atlántico, Córdoba and Sucre had significantly diminished the influence of the Clan del Golfo.

On October 8, 2020, imprisoned former Clan del Golfo leader Jhony Fidel Cuello-Petro, alias "Mocho," arrived in Houston, TX after being extradited to the US from Colombia. Colombian authorities took Mocho into custody in November 2018. On October 15, 2020, one of two Clan del Golfo members who killed a man at a car wash located in Yalí in the Antioquia department was killed by the members of the Colombian National Army, while the other was captured. On October 16, 2020, Colombian National Police announced that a senior Clan del Golfo financier who served leader of cartel's Edwin Román Velázquez Valle substructure was among four Edwin Román Velázquez Valle members who were arrested in the Antioquia municipalities of Buriticá, Saznta Fe and Livorina. According to National Police officer Colonel William Castaño, head of the National Unit against Illegal Mining and Antiterrorism, the senior Clan Del Golfo financier identified as "Diego" "was in charge of the extortion of merchants and people dedicated to the extraction of minerals in this part of the country."

On October 28, 2020, it was reported that the Colombian and Panamanian security forces seized more than two tons of cocaine hydrochloride belonging to the Clan del Golfo. This resulted in the cartel losing $70 million. Four Colombians and one Honduran on the submarine which contained the cocaine hydrochloride were arrested as well. On November 17, 2020, alleged financier and route coordinator of the Clan del Golfo, Jorge Eliécer Castaño Toro, alias "Plástico," and his deputy Darwin Abad Sierra, alias "Number 17," were arrested by Colombian National Police.

Between December 30, 2020 and January 2, 2021, 181 Clan del Golfo members were successfully targeted in Operation Agamemnon, with the Colombia Presidency and Colombian National releasing a joint statement revealing that: "The mission was structured in 38 operations with 117 search procedures and raids, which resulted in 177 arrests and four neutralizations." Among those arrested were John Fredy Zapata Garzón, alias "Messi" or "Candado," and seven of his closest collaborators. According to Colombian National Police Major General Fernando Murillo Orrego, head of the Directorate of Criminal Investigation and Interpol (DIJIN), "Zapata Garzón ran a narco-trafficking and money laundering organization associated with the Clan del Golfo." The DIJIN also released a statement revealing that Zapata Garzón shared routes for drug trafficking to Europe and the United States with the Clan del Golfo, through shell companies, investments, and real estate and personal properties in 17 Departments of Colombia. In December 2020, the U.S. Treasury Department sanctioned Zapata Garzón "for materially assisting the international narcotics trafficking activities of the Clan del Golfo." The joint federal statement, which was released on January 4, 2021, also revealed that the number of Clan del Golfo members arrested during the phase of Operation Agamemnon that started on December 30, 2020, had increased to 198 by then.

In March 2021, the Clan del Golfo's structures suffered major blows with the arrests of 25 more members. According to the Colombian Navy, those arrested are alleged to have been responsible for smuggling more than 13 tons of cocaine into Honduras, Costa Rica, and Panama during 19 drug trafficking operations. Nini Jhoana Úsuga, alias "La Negra," would be recaptured during these arrests. Main Clan del Golfo leader Rubén D. Meléndez, alias "Porrón," and Clan del Golfo weapons supplier and alleged FARC associate, Martín Boyaco, were among those arrested as well. Porrón was arrested on March 13, 2021, while Boyaco, who was believed to have provide financing to the Clan del Golfo by supplying weapons to FARC dissident leader Iván Mordisco, was arrested on March 11, 2021. On August 18, 2021, Colombia security forces arrested Luis Daniel Santan Hernández, alias "Machete." Machete, who was wanted by the Colombian government since 2017, and who was captured shortly before he was scheduled to get married, was not only the coordinator of security, logistics, and criminal activities of other Clan del Golfo leaders stationed in western Antioquia, but was also regarded as "leader of the largest criminal gang in Colombia."

Wilmer Antonio Giraldo Quiroz, aka "Siopas," number two in the AGC organisation, was found dead in February 2023. He appears to have been the victim of an internal purge.

In March 2023, Colombian President Gustavo Petro announced that he was suspending a ceasefire between the armed forces of Colombia and the Clan del Golfo following an attack on an aqueduct and shooting at police officers. The President also accused the cartel of inciting a protest from informal gold miners.

At the time of his New York sentencing in August 2023, Dario Antonio Úsuga David was described by U.S. federal prosecutors as the cartel's "supreme leader" and “the most violent and significant” Colombian drug trafficker since Pablo Escobar.

On 26 December, 2023, Clan del Golfo boss Jacob Rodríguez Úsuga, also known as "Atilio," was arrested by police in the municipality of Carepa, in Antioquia. Atilio is a cousin of Oteniel.

According to the BBC, the current leader of the group is Chiquito Malo. As of March 2025, the organization's so-called board of directors is led by Malo, followed by the second-in-command, José Gonzalo Sánchez, alias “Gonzalito,” and then Orosman Ostén Blanco, alias “Rodrigo Flechas,” alias “Julián,” and alias “Joaquín.”

== Armed strikes ==
On January 5, 2012, Clan del Golfo launched an armed strike which affected much of northern Colombia to protest the killing of their leader "Giovanni." The strike completely paralyzed several Colombian departments, as shopkeepers and travelers were told to stay at home or face "consequences."

In 2012, Clan del Golfo came into conflict with The Office of Envigado over the drug trade in Medellín.

In 2017, Clan del Golfo began a "pistol plan" against police officers because one of their leaders was killed.

In April and May 2022, Clan del Golfo launched attacks across rural northern Colombia after their leader Dairo Antonio Úsuga was extradited to the United States.

== In popular culture ==
The Clan del Golfo has been featured and discussed in several documentary programs, such as the series by Vice entitled Criminal Planet (2021), as well as the British television program Cocaine: Living with the Cartels (2019).

== See also ==
- Coca production in Colombia
- Colombian conflict
- Revolutionary Armed Forces of Colombia
- Illegal drug trade in Colombia
- Maritime drug trafficking in Latin America
- Medellín Cartel
- National Liberation Army
