= Víctor Carranza =

Colombian Emerald dealer and mine owner

- Born: Víctor Manuel Carranza Niño; October 8, 1935; Guateque, Boyacá, Colombia
- Died: 4 April 2013 (aged 77); Bogotá, Colombia
- Other names: The Emerald tsar
- Occupation: Emerald mine owner
- Known for: Emerald mining empire

Víctor Carranza Niño (8 October 1935 – 4 April 2013), often referred to as Don Víctor was a Colombian emerald dealer and the owner of emerald mines in the Boyacá mountains (a forested area not far from Bogotá), widely known as Colombia's "emerald czar." The economy of the area around the mines is dependent on the trade. Carranza faced several legal challenges and investigations throughout his life. In 1998, he was arrested and imprisoned on charges of forming paramilitary groups. In 2012, he was again investigated for alleged links to paramilitary activities and crimes such as homicide, forced displacement, and conspiracy.

== Early life ==
Víctor Carranza was born in the small town of Guateque, Boyacá, in a very poor family of farmers and pig growers. He had dropped school already at 2nd grade, and by age 8 he was already involved in emerald business, by scratching the soil for the gemstones, and then a few years later as a mine worker in Chivor. He started making money after moving to Gachalá, in 1947, where he found three large sources. He found his first emerald mine in 1960, Peñas Blancas, and from then on his influence and power kept increasing, expanding his business by associating with others, buying share rights from new mines in Muzo and Quípama, and selling emeralds in Europe, thanks particularly to his business with lawyer Juan Beetar Down, who took Carranza to many countries and opened to him the doors of political influence and taught him in the art of diplomacy, leading to even meet often with presidents. The money flowing in from the newfound mines soon became a matter of conflict and in the 1960s a series of vendettas and disputes gave rise to the so-called "first green war," which he not only survived but used in his favor to increase his power. He had already made a name as a wealthy and stingy man, but also as a violent man, surrounded by armed bodyguards.

== Associates ==
One of his most powerful associates was Gilberto Molina Moreno, the "emerald czar" of the time, and together they were the main beneficiaries of the requests for bids of the emerald mines by the governments of Misael Pastrana and Alfonso López, which essentially eliminated governmental control of the mines, and allowed Carranza and Molina to legalize their riches and to take control of the security of the regions. A new green war was unleashed in the 1980s, and this one also involved violent drug lord Gonzalo Rodríguez Gacha, who had been an old associate of both Carranza and Molina. Carranza was always linked to Rodríguez Gacha, but Carranza always denied such links and stated he always opposed the introduction of drug cartels in his region. Rodríguez Gacha had wanted to consolidate his power in the region, and also received financial support from Molina to train the first paramilitary troops. When the drug lord allegedly asked them to participate as a partner in the mines, Molina and Carranza refused which led to violent retaliation by the drug lord, who murdered Molina, and later detonated a bomb in the offices of Tecminas in Bogotá, which were property of Carranza, and whose nephew's murder he also ordered. These violent actions led Carranza to a self-imposed internment to protect himself. Reportedly, Carranza was instrumental in providing intelligence reports about Rodríguez Gacha that led to his demise.

== The Emerald Czar ==
The death of Rodríguez Gacha and that of other emerald traders meant he obtained even more power, and in 1990 he signed a peace agreement with his rivals in the business, particularly Luis Murcia, (aka el Pequinés) mediated by the Catholic church. He also spread his connection to politicians, and military, which joined to his entrepreneurial proficiency led him to become the new emerald czar, one that ruled with an iron fist. As such he enjoyed some peace, and although he was completely involved in the green wars and the thousands of deaths they produced, he was never accused for that reason. He also bought many lands in the Llanos Orientales region, to such an extent that at his peak he managed to own about 10,000 acres, and he created his own militia to protect them, the feared "Carranceros." This and his friendship with the region paramilitary leader Héctor Buitrago (aka Martín Llanos) only reinforced his links to illegal paramilitary groups, for which he never was judged. He was accused by paramilitary leader Don Mario of being the instigator of the war between the paramilitary organizations led by Miguel Arroyave and Buitrago respectively that led to thousands of deaths in the department of Casanare.

== Arrests ==
He was accused, however, of participating in a massacre of 40 farmers in the Meta department and arrested, but he was absolved two months later. Some years later he would be part of a new conflict, this time involving Leonidas Vargas, an old worker of Rodríguez Gacha who accused him of the disappearance of his daughter. His support of the Convivir watch groups which were at the root of many paramilitary organizations led him to jail once again in 1998, and a controversy was created when Juan Manuel Santos (ex president of Colombia) called the Attorney General to ask about his friend Carranza, and also when he was visited in jail by the then president of the powerful cattlemen association Fedegán. Despite the finding of corpses and a paramilitary training camp in some of his farms, he only spent three years and a half jailed in a DAS installation, during which time an attempt at his life was made by poisoning his food. He was finally absolved, once again, when the judge to determine his guilt was suddenly changed, and the new judge found no reason to condemn him.

== Green Wars ==
Once out of jail his war with Leonidas Vargas continued, until the latter was killed by hitmen in Spain in 2009. He also found himself in another war, this time against Yesid Nieto, a young emerald trader who had made a fortune in drug trafficking and had started making a name in the emerald field after being introduced to it by another rival of Carranza, Pedro Nel Rincón, (aka Pedro Orejas). Nieto appointed himself as the new emerald czar and associated with the paramilitary forces at the service of Freddy Rendón (aka el Alemán) to fight Carranza. Nieto was killed in Guatemala in 2007. The conflict with Rincón continued, despite some attempts at negotiation, as Rincón involved himself with a number of drug lords and paramilitary leaders, particularly Pedro Oliveiro Guerrero (a.k.a. Cuchillo) and Daniel Barrera Barrera. It was in the context of this new green war that some months later another attempt at Carranza's life was made when his convoy was attacked with guns and grenades, an attack that has been attributed to Rincón and the drug lords. It's estimated that 25 assassination attempts were made on Carranza's life.

== Death ==
In a 2012 interview for Al Jazeera, Carranza declared "Six years ago I was diagnosed with prostate cancer and I never took a pill for that. But two years ago I got lung cancer and that one has got me all the way up to the hair .... It's about time for God to remember me and call me to his side." Also in 2012, prosecutors launched an investigation to find out whether Carranza financed a number of paramilitary groups in the 1990s based on testimony given by a former leader of the paramilitary group called United Self-Defense Forces of Colombia, Hélmer Herrera. Carranza claimed that he was instead the victim of extortion. After being hospitalized for a week in Fundación Santa Fe de Bogotá he finally died of lung cancer on April 4, 2013.

== Additional sources ==
- "Colombia's emerald tsar", documentary from Al Jazeera
- Colombia's Great Survivor: Victor Carranza
