= Dairo Antonio Úsuga =

Colombian former drug lord

Dairo Antonio Úsuga David
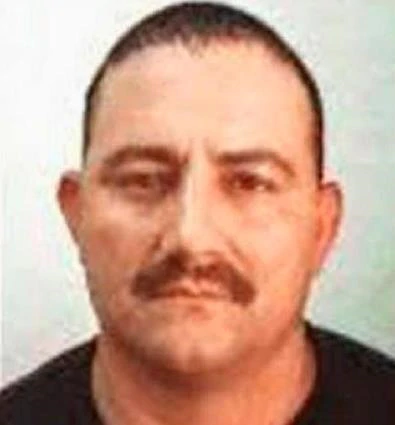
- Undated photograph of Úsuaga
- Born: September 15, 1971 (age 55); Necoclí, Antioquia, Colombia
- Other names: Otoniel, Mauricio, Mao
- Occupation: Drug lord
- Organization: Gulf Clan
- Status: Incarcerated
- Penalty: 45 years imprisonment
- Reward amount: Colombia:$800,000; U.S:$5,000,000

Details
- Imprisoned at: ADX Florence

Dairo Antonio Úsuga David (born September 15, 1971), also known as Otoniel, is a Colombian convicted drug lord and former top leader of the drug trafficking group Clan del Golfo (also known as Los Urabeños or "Gulf Clan"). Úsuaga is also an ex-paramilitary, having been a member of the Popular Liberation Army (EPL) and the United Self-Defense Forces of Colombia (AUC). After being pursued by Colombian authorities for a decade, he was captured in October 2021 in an operation requiring the mobilization of more than 500 special forces personnel, 150 intelligence units, 50 satellite intelligence experts, 22 helicopters, and the intervention of intelligence agencies from the United States and the United Kingdom. He was extradited to the United States in May 2022. At the time of his capture, 132 warrants for his arrest had been issued.

He was also responsible for the deaths of more than 200 members of the Colombian Public Force. Then-president Iván Duque stated that Úsuga’s capture “is only comparable to the fall of Pablo Escobar in the 1990s”. Defense minister Diego Molano described him as "one of the greatest symbols of evil in Colombia." In August 2023, he pled guilty in New York to charges related to his time as the Gulf Clan leader: he was ordered to pay US$216 million in forfeitures and is currently serving a 45-year sentence. He also faces coordinated charges in Florida.

== Early affiliations ==
Born on September 15, 1971, in Necoclí, in northwestern Colombia, Dairo Antonio Úsuga David, known as "Otoniel," came from a modest peasant family. In 1989, at the age of 18, he joined the Popular Liberation Army (EPL), a guerrilla group with a strong presence in the region which sought to defend poor peasants against landowners and the government. In a 2015 interview with a journalist, his mother explained: "He was not a revolutionary. But it was all there was and he went with them." The EPL signed a peace agreement with the government two years later, in 1991, and its members returned to civilian life. He then joined the United Self-Defense Forces of Colombia (Autodefensas Unidas de Colombia, or AUC), a Colombian far-right paramilitary and drug trafficking group.

In 2005, Úsuga began working for Daniel Rendón Herrera, the then-leader of the Los Urabeños drug trafficking group. Otoniel and his brother Giovanni (born Juan de Dios Usuga) took control of the Los Urabeños in 2009. After Giovanni was shot and killed during a police raid, Otoniel took full leadership of the drug trafficking group. New York federal prosecutors described Úsuga as “the most violent and significant” Colombian drug trafficker since Pablo Escobar, and as the Gulf Clan's "supreme leader."

== Search ==
Colombian police sought the arrest of Úsuga since around 2011. In 2015, the BBC reported that 1,200 Colombian anti-drug police were involved in the search for Úsuga. That same year, a Colombian police helicopter searching for Úsuga crashed, resulting in 18 deaths. In 2017, the US Department of State offered a $5 million reward for information leading to his arrest. Also in 2017, Colombian anti-trafficking police dropped flyers from helicopters offering a $5 million reward for information leading to his capture. In 2017, Úsuga published a video on Facebook in which he offered to submit to a negotiated surrender.

In early 2021, Colombian authorities intensified their search efforts for Úsuga, following heightened levels of cocaine production.

== Capture ==
Early in October 2021, Colombian intelligence officials identified Úsuga's likely hideout as being in the Urabá, Antioquia region of north-western Colombia, near the Panamanian border. The detection of his location was facilitated by the tracking of cartel members who were bringing him a specific type of medication to treat his kidney disease. Early on the morning of October 22, a military team, code-named "El Blanco," surrounded his believed hiding place with hundreds of troops, 20 helicopters, and 10 unmanned surveillance drones. The capture involved blocking rivers and roads that could have been used as escape routes. Additionally, Colombian Navy ships were stationed offshore to prevent any escape by sea. Colombian military forces subsequently captured Úsuga, who was revealed to be hiding in a remote mountainous area. Úsuga was captured the afternoon of October 23, and at the time of his arrest, Úsuga was the most wanted drug lord in Colombia, with the Colombian government issuing an $800,000 bounty for his capture. He was also revealed to still be involved in trafficking, though his cartel by this point was severely weakened.

He was heard in mid-February 2022 by the Special Jurisdiction for Peace (JEP), where he reportedly said he had organized his surrender and worked with the Colombian army, according to leaked media reports. The police interrupted the hearing, claiming to suspect Otoniel of planning his escape. Digital recordings containing his testimony to the JEP were later stolen.

On May 4, 2022, Úsuga was extradited to the United States.

== Trial ==
In January 2023, he pleaded guilty in New York, meaning he was slated to face decades in prison for leading a violent cartel and paramilitary group.

Úsuga was sentenced to 45 years in prison in New York in August 2023. U.S. District Judge Dora Irizarry, who was the judge in charge of his sentencing, found that it was proven that he had shipped nearly 100 metric tons (220,000 lb) of cocaine into the United States while he was serving as the leader of the crime syndicate Clan del Golfo (Golf Clan), describing him as "extraordinary" and among drug dealers "who were more prolific than Pablo Escobar." In addition, "Otoniel" was fined $216 million.

US Attorney General Merrick Garland said Úsuga "ordered the reckless execution of Colombian police officers, soldiers, and civilians". In addition to his New York charges, he also faces coordinated charges in south Florida, which include conspiracy to ship vast quantities of cocaine north by land and sea.

As of January 2024, Úsuga is housed at ADX Florence, the federal Supermax prison in Florence, Colorado under Federal Register Number 99420-509.
