= Jeanette Erazo Heufelder =

German ethnologist

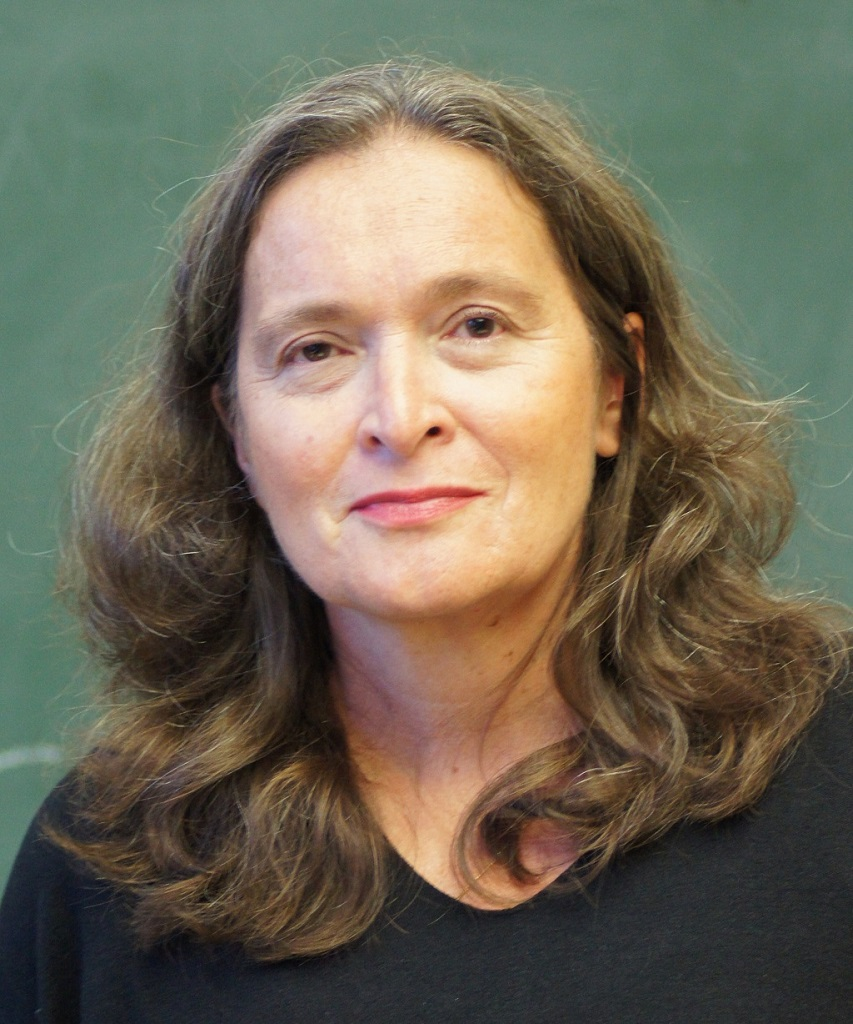
Jeanette Erazo Heufelder, 2019

Jeanette Erazo Heufelder (born Jeanette Erazo: 1964) is a German ethnologist. She has become known as an author and documentary filmmaker of biographical and literary pieces. Her particular regional focus is on Latin America.

== Life ==
Jeanette Erazo was born in Bavaria. Her mother was German, and her father was from Ecuador. She attended LMU Munich where she studied Ethnology and during which time she undertook field research in the Ecuadorian Andes and on the Galápagos Islands. She received her doctorate from the Arts and Social Anthropology Faculty at Marburg University in 1993. Her dissertation concerned culture and ethnicity, focusing on Salasaca as an example.

She is married to the documentary filmmaker Sylvio Heufelder, with whom she has worked professionally.

== Works ==
Jeanette Erazo Heufelder wrote film scripts for documentary films and created film portraits of Latin American artists and human rights activists such as the Guatemalan Nobel Peace Prize winner Rigoberta Menchú and the Colombian Gloria Cuartas, who as mayor of Apartadó struggled against the power of the paramilitaries and drug mafias and was honoured by UNESCO as a "mayor for peace". Her researches and film work in Latin America provided the basis for themes to which she returned in subsequent biographical and other written pieces.

In 1995, she got to know Fidel Castro personally while she was in Havanna working on a film about the painter and sculptor Oswaldo Guayasamín. Her biography "Fidel. Ein privater Blick auf den Máximo Líder" ("Fidel: a private glimpse of the top leader") appeared in 2004. She blended discussions with comrades, contemporaries and opponents into a collection of "anecdotes, facts, legends and quotes" to present the Cuban leader in all his contradictions.

"Der Smaragdkönig. Victor Carranza und das grüne Gold der Anden" ("The emerald king: Victor Carranza and the Green Gold of the Andes") was a literary reportage on the world of mine workers and emerald barons in Colombia. With this book, Erazo Heufelder was nominated for the international "Lettre Ulysses Award" for reportage.

"Drogenkorridor Mexiko" ("Drugs corridor Mexico") appeared in 2011. It dealt with the "drugs war" in Mexico. Erazo Heufelder's research for it included a five-week journey away from the main roads through the frontier region alongside the United States border, from the West Coast near Culiacán, where Joaquín Guzmán's Sinaloa Cartel calls the shots, to Ciudad Juárez on the Texan frontier. At each stage along her travels she found traces of violence and spoke with people living in the "drugs regions". She gathered day-to-day stories and linked them with the history of the area. The strength of her reportage, according to Carsten Hueck, is to be found in the way that she manages to blend together stories of brutality against drugs cartel victims with the otherwise anonymous statistics. She writes of a war that has become normality. Peter Schumann writes that with this book Jeanette Erazo Heufelder has provided "the first comprehensive presentation of the subject that is grounded in reality-based reportage".
