= Daniel Barrera =

Daniel Barrera may refer to:

- Danny Barrera (Daniel Francisco "Danny" Barrera, born 1990), Colombian-born, American professional soccer player
- Daniel Quesada Barrera (born 1995), Spanish taekwondo competitor
- Daniel Barrera Barrera (born c. 1968), Colombian drug lord, known as "El Loco"
