= Oficina de Envigado =

Colombian drug cartel

The Office of Envigado Cartel
- La Oficina
- Founded by: Diego Murillo Bejarano (captured)
- Founding location: Medellín, Colombia
- Years active: Early 1990s–present
- Territory: Medellín, its area and all Antioquia Department
- Ethnicity: Colombian
- Membership: c.2500
- Activities: Drug trafficking, extortion, murder, money laundering, terrorism, bootlegging and gun-running
- Allies: Medellín Cartel (until 1992); Cosa Nostra; Ndrangheta; Los Zetas; Colombian paramilitary drug groups : Los Rastrojos; Sinaloa Cartel; Moroccan mafia
- Rivals: Clan del Golfo; Medellín Cartel (1992 - 1993)

La Oficina de Envigado (English: The Office of Envigado) is a drug cartel and criminal organization originally founded as an enforcement wing and debt collection service of Pablo Escobar's Medellín Cartel. Despite being noted for its historical affiliation with drug trafficking and other organized crime activities, Oficina de Envigado's criminal activities were no longer centered on direct involvement in such activity by 2019 and are now mainly focused on providing services to lower level drug traffickers and mafia groups. It operates throughout Colombia, but mainly in the cities of Medellín and Envigado. It also controlled extortion, gambling, and money laundering businesses within the Valle de Aburrá that surrounds Medellín. It positioned itself as the chief mediator and debt collector in drug trafficking disputes and maintained major connections with Colombian paramilitaries and guerillas.

== History ==
La Oficina was founded as an enforcement wing for the Medellín Cartel by Diego Murillo Bejarano, aka Don Berna (a Popular Liberation Army guerrilla deserter), however Murillo fell out with Escobar and eventually joined forces with Los Pepes in order to oust him. Murillo then began to affiliate his Oficina with the United Self-Defense Forces of Colombia ("Autodefensas Unidas de Colombia", AUC, in Spanish), organizing drug trafficking operations on their behalf. La Terraza, a gang of the most feared hit men in the country, is also under La Oficina's control.

La Oficina eventually evolved into a sizable narco-trafficking operation spanning from Medellín to the northern coast of Colombia, including the Panamanian border area, drawing many of its leaders from former Colombian paramilitary blocs. Its lower ranks are filled with teenagers and young men from the poorer neighborhoods in the hills of Medellín, mainly Robledo and Manrique, who moonlight as hit men willing to kill for as little as US$25.

After the AUC demobilised in 2005, Murillo was arrested for the murder of a local politician, although he managed to run his empire from prison and made a deal with the authorities to use his power to keep violence to a minimum. In 2008, Murillo was extradited along with other paramilitary leaders, and La Oficina was hurt by infighting between rival factions led by Maximiliano Bonilla Orozco, alias Valenciano, and Jordan Acevedo, alias Sebastian, a native of Barrio Popular in Medellín, as well as conflict with the Usuga Clan. Bonilla was arrested in 2011, while Vargas was arrested at his ranch in August 2012.

On July 20, 2014, Hernán Alonso Villa, better known as El Ratón (The Mouse), was stopped en route to one of his safe houses in the south-eastern province of Alicante carrying €40,000 (£31,660) in cash which, according to police, came from drug running and assassinations Villa served as head of Oficina's military wing and was believed to have carried out 400 murders, and other criminal acts including disappearances, extortions and kidnappings.

On December 9, 2017, then Oficina leaders Juan Carlos Mesa Vallejo, also known as “Tom” or “Carlos Chata,” was arrested on December 9 while celebrating his 50th birthday and was charged with aggravated criminal association, illegally carrying military-grade weapons and use of false documents.

One of the leaders of La Oficina, Sebastián Murillo Echeverri, alias "Lindo" and "Lindolfo", son of Rodrigo Murillo alias Jimmy from the Medellín Cartel, was arrested on February 6, 2018 in El Poblado, Medellín along with several high-ranking members of the Group.

On March 23, 2019, Iván Darío Suárez Muñoz, alias “Iván el Barbado,” was arrested during a raid on a luxury condo in Piedecuesta, a town in the northeast department of Santander. On April 3, 2019, Mauricio Zapata Orozco, alias “Chicho,” was arrested at his parents’ home in the wealthy El Poblado district. Orozco came to lead “La Terraza,” one of the Oficina's subgroups, two years after his release from prison. On May 8, 2019, John Eduard Barbosa, an ex-police officer and Oficina lieutenant, was captured while driving in Sabaneta, on the outskirts of Medellín. The arrests of these three individuals left Oficina de Evigado with only five remaining operatives and leaders still at large in the group's homeland of Medellín.

=== Transformation into organized crime coalition ===
On June 11, 2019, John Fredy Yepes, alias "Clemente" was arrested. Succeeding Tom as head of the Oficina de Envigado, Clemente was also described as "Medellín's top mafia boss." His arrest was the latest of more than 135 Oficina bosses and gang leaders arrested over the past three years who made it to the top of the crime organization in little more than 10 years. La Oficina's board of directors was also reported to consist of only five leaders and operatives. Despite this, overall Oficina membership was believed to be at 1,500, The next month, however, it was reported that La Oficina was no longer an individual organization and was transformed into a "mafia federation" consisting of smaller organized crime organizations. As members of La Oficina, these organizations also serve as coalition partners.

== Gang activities ==
As well as drugs, La Oficina controls a number of casinos and gambling establishments, which it uses to launder money. La Oficina also has links with local authority figures and police officers, some of whom moonlight as assassins, and it has alliances with Los Rastrojos and Los Zetas in Mexico. In 2014, Insight Crime reported that La Oficina's had declined due to infighting. In 2017 However, Insight Crime reported that the group had recovered. In July 2019, Insight Crime stated "today’s Oficina is a coalition of mid-sized criminal organizations that provide services to transnational drug traffickers and other mafia elites, and use alliances with gangs to control territory and criminal activities in Medellín. As such, it is perhaps the most complex example of the Colombian mafia today: a tangled web of service providers and subcontractors involved in everything from money laundering and the international cocaine trade to street level drug sales and micro-extortion."
