= Miguel Ángel Mejía Múnera =

Colombian drug lord and Paramilitary leader

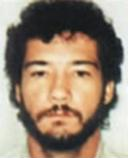
- Born: July 11, 1959 (age 67); Cali, Valle del Cauca; Colombia
- Military career
- Allegiance: United Self-Defense Forces of Colombia (AUC); Paramilitarism; Narcotrafficking
- Rank: Paramilitary unit commander and narcotics entrepreneur
- Nicknames: "El Mellizo" "Pablo Mejía" "Rafael Mejia"
- Units: Bloque Vencedores de Arauca "Los Nevados" drug gang

Miguel Ángel Mejía Múnera aka "El Mellizo" or "Pablo Mejía" or "Rafael Mejia" (born July 11, 1959) is a presumed Colombian drug lord and former paramilitary leader. Along with brother Víctor Manuel he created a drug cartel called "Los Nevados" out of a former paramilitary which they bought for US$ million dollars. The cartel buys illegal drugs from Daniel Barrera Barrera another drug lord working along with both the Revolutionary Armed Forces of Colombia (FARC) as well as paramilitaries. The brothers have also been known to employ many ex-military and special bodyguards like Francisco Rivas Gonzales "Superman" who has disappeared, and believed to be somewhere in Mexico or Central America. Mejía-Múnera has a son who was born in December 6 in NY; he is presumed to be living with his mother in the US. Exact whereabouts are unknown. He also has two daughters whose whereabouts are unknown.

With a source from W Radio, by the lawyer representing him, Mr. Arroyave, it is reported on June 17, 2020, that he is infected with SARS‑CoV‑2.

According to the US Department of State the "Mellizos" have managed multi-ton cocaine transportation routes from the Caribbean Region of Colombia to the United States and Europe since the late 1990s. Their transportation and money laundering organization was conservatively estimated to have transported approximately 68 tons of cocaine over a two-year time period. In 2003 their organization was dismantled during an Italian-US multi-jurisdictional effort called Operation Journey. That operation carried in Italy by Carabinieri special corp, called ROS, resulted in the seizure of 25 tons of cocaine and the arrest of 43 individuals, however, the Mejía-Múnera brothers escaped.

Mejía-Múnera was also involved in the Paramilitary Peace Process until he failed to turn himself into the Government of Colombia in August 2006. In 2003, Miguel and his brother Victor Mejía-Múnera were indicted in the Southern District of Florida for conspiracy to import cocaine. The US Department of State is offering a reward of up to US$5 million for information leading to the arrest and/or conviction of Mejia-Munera.

Colombian former minister of Defense Juan Manuel Santos informed that Mejia-Munera had five arrest warrants and one extradition petition by the United States. Colombian authorities also related the Cocaleros protest of the weeks before his death in the municipality of Tarazá to Mejía-Múnera as a strategy to distract authorities and escape.

He was released from US Federal Prison June 26, 2020.

== Arrest ==
On May 2, 2008, Mejía Múnera was captured by Colombian police in Honda, Tolima, just days after his twin brother Víctor Manuel was killed. He was captured at a police roadblock, hiding in a small compartment behind the driver's seat of a Kenworth cargo truck that authorities had been tracking. Mejía Múnera was extradited to the United States in March 2009. The five million reward that was on his head will be delivered to the person that gave the information that led to his arrest, said Bogotá. Colombia paid US$1,3 million to Colombia's Victim Reparation Fund. The money will be used to compensate victims of paramilitary violence. After his captured his family fled the country into hiding. No one knows their exact location just that they are living in the U.S. His ex-wife is wanted for questioning but her whereabouts is unknown. Her name is Keyla, born September 18, 1973. No photo was ever released. His family has problems with varies cartels because of all the information the "Rafael" gave when he was arrested.

Angel is presumed to have left one billion dollars for the use of his family after his arrest. The rival cartels are also looking for his children but they are believed to in safe haven by the cartel "los nevados". The family cartel has risen once again but who knows for how long this time. If a blood aire to the throne of "Los nevados" does not claim soon the cartel might be lost. According to Colombian law enforcement the new cartel appears to be run by a cousin of "The Mellizos".
