= Héctor Germán Buitrago =

Colombian right-wing paramilitary leader and drug lord

Héctor Germán Buitrago Parada
- Born: January 23, 1968 (age 58); Monterrey, Casanare, Colombia
- Other names: Martín Llanos, Patezorro, Marroco
- Occupations: Paramilitary leader; drug lord
- Years active: Late 1990s – 2012
- Organization: Autodefensas Campesinas de Casanare (ACC)
- Known for: Last of the major paramilitary leaders to be captured
- Status: Imprisoned
- Criminal charges: Assassination; murder
- Penalty: 35 years for the assassination of 34 people 14 years for the murder of Emiro Sossa

Details
- Date apprehended: February 4, 2012

Héctor Germán Buitrago Parada (January 23, 1968 in Monterrey, Casanare), also known as Martín Llanos, and also as Patezorro or Marroco, is a Colombian right-wing paramilitary leader and drug lord. At the time of his arrest by authorities he was considered the last one of the big paramilitary leaders, as he had been successful in evading capture for years.

== Biography ==
=== Early life ===
By the end of the 1970s his father, Héctor José Buitrago Rodríguez (also known as "El Viejo" or "Tripas"), had assembled a group of cattle-raiser families in the municipalities of Monterrey, in the Casanare department, in the region of Colombia's eastern plains, and provided them with weapons so as to fight against extortion and kidnapping by the FARC guerrillas. As this early group, known as "Los Buitragueños," grew up in power and influence it became the basis of the Autodefensas Campesinas de Casanare (ACC), one of the most powerful paramilitary organizations in Colombia. The growth of the organization was supported by the economic and military support provided by drug lord Gonzalo Rodríguez Gacha, going from a group of about 60 individuals to about 500. It has also been suggested that the organization received support from emerald czar Víctor Carranza. With the death of Rodríguez Gacha in 1989, the ACC became closer to drug trafficking organizations in Venezuela.

Buitrago's father ordered a massacre of eleven members of a judicial commission in 1997, which led to his being arrested in 1998. He was liberated from jail by his sons, Buitrago and his brother Nelson (also known as "Caballo"), but eventually recaptured in 2010.

=== Command of ACC ===
With his father's arrest, Buitrago took command of the ACC, expanding their military influence as well as their trade with Mexican drug cartels, and its political influence by funding political campaigns. As the organization grew up in power and influence, however, this growth collided with the interests of the AUC paramilitary organization, which the ACC had never joined. The AUC wanted control of the departments of Meta and Casanare and this led to a violent war between the ACC and the Centaurs Bloc of the AUC under the command of paramilitary leaders including Miguel Arroyave and Cuchillo. Emerald czar Víctor Carranza was accused by paramilitary leader Don Mario as being an instigator of the conflict by telling both paramilitary leaders that the other was attempting to kill them. Other sources have suggested instead that Carranza actually helped the Buitrago side, as he had been long-time friend of Buitrago's father, and pushed local policemen to attack Arroyave's gunmen. Whatever the case, and despite recruiting hundreds of children and teenagers to help with the war, leaving thousands of fatalities behind, the AUC proved superior. This led to Buitrago seeking allegiances with former enemies from the FARC guerrilla, particularly commander Negro Acacio, to no avail. Famously, Arroyave seized a golden pistol that had been given to Buitrago as a gift by Mexican drug cartels.

=== Defeat ===
The defeat came at the same time as the AUC were negotiating a peace process with the national government of Álvaro Uribe. Buitrago decided not to adhere on the grounds of not wanting to be compared with other paramilitary leaders, and because he felt he could be betrayed and even killed as was the case with Carlos Castaño and even his former enemy Miguel Arroyave. Buitrago then decided to leave the country, spending time in Costa Rica, Ecuador, Bolivia, and Venezuela. While he remained outside of the country, however, his organization regained strength with the assassination of Arroyave and the peace negotiations, and the ACC started regaining control of coca growing lands and drug trafficking routes in Casanare and most of the eastern plains regions.

=== Arrest ===
Buitrago remained relatively anonymous throughout this time, and authorities only had an old picture of him, but after an international operation that involved tracking of Buitrago's wife and mistress they managed to capture him and his brother on February 4, 2012 in the eastern Venezuelan city of Acarigua. Buitrago was condemned to 35 years in prison for the assassination of 34 people. He was also condemned to 14 years for the murder of Casanare's governor Emiro Sossa in 2001.
