= Pedro Oliverio Guerrero =

Colombian drug lord and former paramilitary leader

Pedro Oliveiro Guerrero Castillo (February 28, 1970 in San Martín, Meta, – December 24, 2010 in Mapiripán, Meta), also known as Cuchillo (The Knife), and as Didier, was a Colombian drug lord and the former leader of the Colombian Popular Revolutionary Anti-communist Army (Spanish: Ejército Revolucionario Anticomunista de Colombia – ERPAC), a drug trafficking, right wing paramilitary organization. His nickname came from the favoured weapon he used on his victims.

Member of a family already involved in crime, Guerrero and his siblings were known as Los Cuchillos (the Knives) due to their habit of sporting those weapons. He joined the underground crime world during his teenage years as a member of the private militia of drug lord Gonzalo Rodríguez Gacha, aka El Mexicano. Following the death of El Mexicano, Guerrero escaped to the department of Guaviare where he joined the paramilitary groups that were active in the region. These paramilitary groups grew in number and influence and came to be called the Bloque Centauros of the United Self-Defense Forces of Colombia (AUC) under the command of Miguel Arroyave. Guerrero had ascended through the ranks and by the end of the 1990s he was the commander of the Bloque in the Guaviare department. As such, he got involved in drug trafficking and soon got involved in many violent vendettas over the control of territory and drug trafficking routes.

He survived the war for the control of the department of Casanare between the Bloque Centauros and the paramilitary group of Héctor Germán Buitrago (aka Martín Llanos), and then was blamed as the author of the death of his own boss, Miguel Arroyave by Salvatore Mancuso, who declared Guerrero a military target. Following the death of Arroyave, Guerrero became one of the leaders of the divided factions of Bloque Centauros.

As the government of Alvaro Uribe started a peace process with the paramilitary organizations, Guerrero demobilized on April 6, 2006, turning a 1.024 weapons arsenal that included grenades, guns, and rifles, but since he mistrusted the process he refused to join the remaining leaders and returned to his territory where he created the Colombian Popular Revolutionary Anti-communist Army (Spanish: Ejército Revolucionario Anticomunista de Colombia – ERPAC), and started trafficking drugs yet again.

As he grew up in power, linked to other drug dealers and crime lords like Daniel Barrera Barrera, and members of some fronts of FARC, he got involved in numerous vendettas, particularly as Héctor Germán Buitrago (aka Martín Llanos) returned to the region. He started personally assassinating former Centauros members as he accused them of treason. He also misappropriated many farms that he considered strategic for his drug trafficking routes, leaving many fatalities and forced displaced victims. He also started a war against Colombian emerald tsar Víctor Carranza, and has been blamed as the main author of an attempt on Carranza's life.

== Death ==
The Colombian government had started a number of operations to capture Guerrero. In December 2010, as the police received information about his presence in the area of Mapiripán, Meta, to celebrate Christmas they launched a strong operation that captured various close members of his group. It has been suggested that Carranza had been offering rewards for information about Guerrero's whereabouts. Guerrero managed to escape through the jungle, dragged by two bodyguards, which made the authorities assume he had been hurt. His body was discovered a couple days later tangled among shrubs in a nearby brook. It was established that he had been inebriated at the moment of the operation and it's assumed he either died of cardiac arrest as he was escaping or that he fell to the brook and drowned.
