= Víctor Manuel Mejía Múnera =

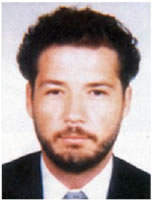
- Born: July 11, 1959; Cali, Valle del Cauca; Colombia
- Died: April 29, 2008 (aged 48); Surroundings of Tarazá
- Military career
- Allegiance: United Self-Defense Forces of Colombia (AUC); Paramilitarism; Drug trafficking
- Rank: Paramilitary unit commander and narcotics entrepreneur
- Nicknames: "El Mellizo" "Pablo Arauca"
- Units: Bloque Vencedores de Arauca "Los Nevados" drug gang

Víctor Manuel Mejía Múnera (July 11, 1959 – April 29, 2008), aka "El Mellizo (the twin)" or "Pablo Arauca", was a Colombian drug lord and former paramilitary leader along twin brother Miguel Ángel of the United Self-Defense Forces of Colombia (AUC) commanding the Bloque Vencedores de Arauca which demobilized in 2006.

Mejia-Munera along with twin brother Miguel Ángel were wanted by the United States and Colombian governments on charges related to the Illegal drug trade in Colombia and forming illegal paramilitary groups for terrorist purposes.

On December 5, 2007, an operation led by Colombian National Police DIJIN police intelligence captured members of his personal army of hitmen known as "Los Nevados", mostly former members of the paramilitary groups.

== Death ==
Victor Manuel was killed in a Colombian National Police operation conducted by an elite unit on April 29, 2008. The operation took place between the municipalities of Tarazá and Caucasia, Department of Antioquia near the border with the Department of Córdoba where Mejía Múnera had sought refuge. He was escorted by six or eight people, two of whom were his personal bodyguards and were killed in the operation, only three of these survived. The Colombian National Police localized Mejia Munera after an informant tipped off the authorities. Initially the police said they killed Victor Manuel's brother. The confusion arose, because Victor Manuel was carrying his brothers papers. His brother Miguel Ángel was captured less than 72 hours after Víctor Manuel's death.

On May 2, 2008 Caracol Radio announced that the body of Victor Mejía had been claimed by the daughter several days later.

Colombian minister of Defense Juan Manuel Santos informed that Mejia-Munera had five arrest warrants and one extradition petition by the United States. Colombian authorities also related the Cocaleros protest of the weeks before his death in the municipality of Tarazá to Mejía-Múnera as a strategy to distract authorities and escape.
