= Miguel Arroyave =

José Miguel Arroyave Ruiz aka "Arcángel" or also "the Chemist" (August 10, 1954 in Amalfi, Antioquia – September 19, 2004 near Puerto Lleras) was one of the top paramilitary leaders and commander of the Centaurs bloc ("Bloque Centauros") of the United Self-Defense Forces of Colombia (AUC), a 5,000-strong private militia active in the sparsely populated grasslands of eastern Colombia. He was also a powerful figure within the United Self-Defense Forces of Colombia (AUC), an umbrella organization bringing together right-wing paramilitary groups from all over the country. He was well known for being a ruthless fighter against guerrilla groups, and for being able to evict these rebel groups and take control of their territories. The Centaurs bloc was one of the largest and most powerful groups within the AUC, and was very well organized, to the point that they even had a running web page that is no longer in service (www.bloquecentauros.org).

Arroyave was a member of the AUC's team of negotiators when talks began with the government on demobilizing the paramilitary organizations which had proliferated over the previous decades. These paramilitary organizations were created first to fight against the left-wing guerrilla armies which controlled large parts of rural Colombia since the 1960s. Arroyave was very close to the Castaño family, founders of different paramilitary organizations, and he also had control over the Capital bloc ("Bloque Capital") which controlled the paramilitary militia in Bogotá.

== Early years ==
José Miguel Arroyave was born in Amalfi, Antioquia. He was very close to the Castaño family, small landowners from northern Colombia who founded the first paramilitary group in the early 1980s. Miguel Arroyave was from a humble rural background, and claims to have been a childhood friend of Carlos Castaño's older brother, Vicente Castaño, with whom he went to school in a small village near Amalfi, in the 1960s. He said that he completed his education at one of Bogotá's leading schools, and later became involved in a gold-mining venture, from which he made some money.

== Paramilitary leader ==
While he was from the Antioquia department, it was in the Eastern Plains regions where he made a name as a criminal. Apparently, he moved to the department of Meta around 1990 where he became a trafficker of chemical products necessary for the processing of cocaine. Arroyave was arrested in 1999, and spent two years in detention, while he tried to convince the authorities that his wealth had not come from illegal activities. He appears to have been involved in the processing and shipping of cocaine to the United States, though he always denied it, as well as in cattle-rustling and in smuggling rackets, but nothing was ever proved against him.

It was after he was released from prison that he supposedly contacted the Castaño brothers so that he could "buy a franchise" from the powerful AUC paramilitary organization, which allowed him to exert control over a large extension of lands in the Eastern Plains. Arroyave apparently acquired the leadership of the Centaurs Bloc by paying a fee of U$6 million, although some of his men have questioned the veracity of this claim. The Centaurs Bloc of the AUC was mostly a gang of thugs involved in crime and blackmailing, which collected money from traders and farm owners in the Eastern Plains in Colombia. It has been said that at some point he managed to rule over 6.000 men in the departments of Meta, Casanare, Boyacá, Cundinamarca, and Guaviare. He also extended his criminal emporium to Bogotá, where by way of the Capital Bloc of the AUC, which he founded and commanded, he controlled a portion of the trade occurring in the traditional “sanandresitos” (old shopping malls where smuggled items and appliances can be bought).

Arroyave also started at some point a bloody war against the Autodefensas Campesinas de Casanare (ACC), a powerful paramilitary group commanded by Héctor Germán Buitrago (aka Martín Llanos) operating on the same territory. Following this bloody feud, which left about 3,000 fatalities, Arroyave became paranoid and suspicious of everyone and began spying on his own men and even ordered some killed, which brought fear and hatred among his troops and has been mentioned as the reason why he was later murdered.

Arroyave was close to Carlos Castaño, one of three Castaño brothers, who had founded the AUC and exerted a degree of influence over most of the 20,000 or so paramilitaries operating in Colombia. However, Castaño's influence and power had been waning within the organization in his last few years, particularly as many paramilitary groups became involved in drug trafficking, and earlier in 2004 the AUC split over the conduct of negotiations with the government of President Álvaro Uribe, whose crackdown on the left-wing guerrillas had impressed some paramilitary commanders. In April, 2004, Castaño disappeared before the talks could begin, following an assault on his headquarters by gunmen apparently dispatched by rival commanders. He has not been seen since, and some human remains were recently discovered, apparently proving that he was in fact assassinated. Whatever the case, with Castaño's disappearance Arroyave lost his main supporter and ally within the AUC.

== Death ==
Following Castaño's disappearance, the remaining AUC leaders subsequently appointed a panel of negotiators, including Arroyave, who now appears to have suffered the same fate as Castaño. Arroyave was killed on September 19, 2004 near Puerto Lleras, Department of Meta in the heart of his home territory, during a break in the talks with the government, which had been going on since May in a safe haven in Córdoba, far to the north. The vehicle in which he was traveling along with four other men was hit by rocket-propelled grenades. The government's chief negotiator, High Commissioner for Peace Luis Carlos Restrepo Ramírez, explained that Arroyave had gone back to the department of Meta to organize the immediate demobilization of his forces.

There are plenty of possible candidates for the murder of Arroyave, who had a great deal of blood on his hands. Perhaps the most likely culprit is "Martin Llanos", leader of the Autodefensas Campesinas de Casanare (ACC) (Farmer Self-Defense Forces of Casanare), the paramilitary group with which Arroyave had been involved in a protracted and bloody feud for more than a year in the eastern plains region. He had been in conflict, too, with other paramilitary chiefs over control of territory, drug-trafficking routes and protection rackets, which continued even while the peace talks were going on. Another possibility, favored by army intelligence, is that Arroyave was assassinated by a hit squad from the main left-wing guerrilla organization, the Revolutionary Armed Forces of Colombia (FARC).

The AUC leadership, however, laid the blame on a rival within Arroyave's very own Centauros organization: they named Pedro Oliveiro Guerrero Castillo (aka "Cuchillo") as the killer, and described him and his associates as "enemies of peace and opponents of the demobilization process in the eastern plains". It has been recently uncovered that Guerrero was working under the orders of Daniel Barrera (aka "El loco"), a notorious drug lord in Colombia who is in jail in the United States government on charges of drug smuggling into this country.

Arroyave, along with Carlos Castaño remains one of the most powerful and important assassinated members of the United Self-Defense Forces of Colombia organization.
