= Public Forces (Colombia) =

Public Forces of Colombia
- Fuerza Publica
- Service branches: Colombian National Army; Colombian Navy ∟Colombian Naval Infantry; Colombian Air Force; National Police of Colombia

Leadership
- Commander-in-Chief: President Gustavo Petro
- Minister of Defense: Pedro Arnulfo Sánchez

Personnel
- Military age: 18
- Conscription: 18 months Army and Air Force, 24 months Navy, 12 Months National Police
- Active personnel: 470, 634 (2014)

Industry
- Domestic suppliers: Indumil; Cotecmar

The Colombian Constitution (Spanish: Constitución Política de Colombia) includes two overlapping definitions of what would be defined as "armed forces" in English:

- Public Forces (Spanish: Fuerza Pública): includes the Military and the National Police (Title VII, chapter VII, Art. 216)
- Military Forces (Spanish: Fuerzas Militares): includes only the military (Army, Air Force, and Navy) (Title VII, chapter VII, Art. 217)

This is a subtle yet important distinction, both in terms of emphasizing the civil nature of the National Police, but also in adapting the national police to function as a paramilitary force which can perform military duties as a result of the Colombian conflict. This has led to some of the most important police units adopting military training and conducting special operations alongside the Colombian Army, Air Force, and Navy. Therefore, the functions of the Colombian Police in practical terms are similar to those of the Spanish Civil Guard and the Carabineros de Chile, which maintain military ranks for all personnel and exercise both policing and military responsibilities.

The Ministry of National Defence exercises operational control over the Military and Police. The President of Colombia is the Commander in Chief of the military and Supreme commander of the National Police.
