= Daniel Barrera Barrera =

Colombian drug lord

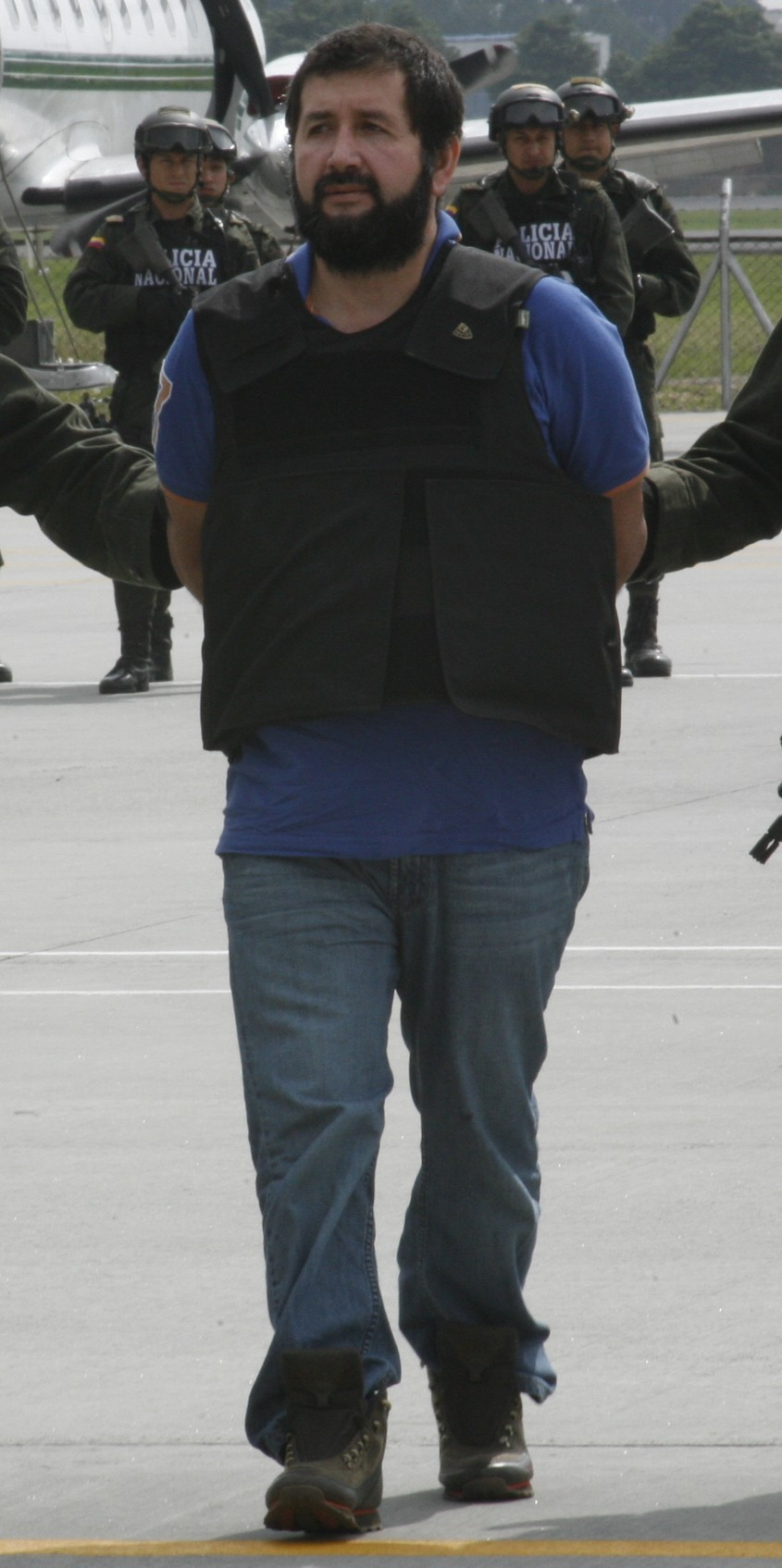
- Daniel "El Loco" Barrera before his extradition to the United States
- Born: c. 1968 (age 55–56); Bolívar, Santander, Colombia
- Other name: El Loco ("The Crazy One")
- Occupation: Drug trafficker
- Convictions: Drug trafficking and smuggling, illegal distribution of cocaine, arms trafficking, money laundering, assassination
- Penalty: Sentenced to 35 years on July 25, 2016

Daniel Barrera Barrera, also known as El Loco, is a Colombian drug lord suspected of being the boss of the illegal drug trade in Colombia's eastern plains. He was arrested in Venezuela on September 18, 2012 after trafficking drugs for more than 20 years. The arrest of the drug lord, according to news reports in the New York Times, was the result of a complex four-nation endeavor. Colombian President Juan Manuel Santos named Barrera "the last of the great kingpins".

According to the Colombian National Police intelligence service DIJIN, Barrera bribed numerous Colombian policemen in order to maintain his drug emporium in Bogotá, which has grown after being a key link in the drug business first with members of the Revolutionary Armed Forces of Colombia (FARC) guerrilla group and later with members of the United Self-Defense Forces of Colombia (AUC) paramilitary group and members Colombian Government Forces.

== Other aliases ==
Besides being known as "El Loco" Barrera goes by the names of "German Barrera", "Arnoldo Barrera", "Vicente Rivera" or "El Gordo".

== Early years ==
According to an article by Colombian magazine Revista Semana, Barrera initiated his illegal drug activities in San José del Guaviare in the 1980s under the support of his brother Omar Barrera. His brother was gunned down a few months after being in Guaviare for what he took revenge and respect among the other drug dealers in the region.

On February 7, 1990 Barrera was arrested on drug charges by Colombian authorities. After a few months, in October of that same year Barrera escaped from prison.

== Business with FARC ==
According to Colombian authorities, Barrera was a key associate of the Revolutionary Armed Forces of Colombia (FARC) in drug retail and distribution. Barrera was an associate of alias "Negro Acacio" a renowned guerrilla commander involved in the illegal drug trade business for the FARC. Barrera was a buyer of illegal drugs to many of the Eastern Bloc of the FARC-EP' fronts which included the 14th, 17th, 10th and 16th fronts, as well as contacts with alias "John 40" guerrilla chief of the 42nd front.

== Business with paramilitary groups ==
Barrera had parallel illegal drug businesses also with FARC's enemy, the United Self-Defense Forces of Colombia (AUC) bloc; Vencedores de Arauca Bloc which was led by Miguel Ángel y Víctor Mejía, aliased "Los Mellizos" (the twins). According to Colombian authorities Barrera also assassinated the commander of the Centauros Bloc of the AUC after presumably having differences.

Part of the drug produced by the FARC in western Colombia was bought by Barrera and sold to cartels or paramilitary groups. The Norte del Valle Cartel, as well as small cartels in the Department of Antioquia, the Caribbean region and Department of Narino were among his customers, among these cartels were people strongly associated with the enemy; paramilitary groups.

On December 15, 2007 the Colombian newspaper El Tiempo reported that Barrera was the link between the FARC and a new cartel called Los Nevados formed by former paramilitary group and led by alias the "Mellizos" (the twin [brothers]) Víctor Manuel and Miguel Ángel Mejía Múnera. The drug lord allegedly was also one of the main allies of the neo-paramilitary groups ERPAC, commanded by Pedro Oliveiro Guerrero, aka 'Cuchillo', as well as Los Rastrojos, a group formed by former commanders of one of the military wings of the Norte del Valle cartel

== Arrest in Venezuela ==
On September 18, 2012, Barrera was arrested by Venezuelan security forces in San Cristobal, a town ten miles from the Colombian border. The arrest was announced by Colombian President Juan Manuel Santos live on national television. According to Santos, Barrera was "the last of the great capos." According to Colombia's defense minister, Juan Carlos Pinzón, and the country's national police chief, the arrest was the result of a months-long cooperation between authorities from Colombia and Venezuela, U.K. intelligence agency MI6 and U.S. intelligence agency CIA. Additional investigational support was provided by U.S. Immigration and Customs Enforcement, U.S. Drug Enforcement Administration and U.S. Treasury Office of Foreign Asset Control.

== United States Prosecution ==
Charges were announced by three U.S. Attorneys on July 10, 2013. For the Southern District of New York Preet Bharara, U.S. Attorney for the Eastern District of New York Loretta E. Lynch, and for the Southern District of Florida Wifredo A. Ferrer bring the following charges. In the Southern District of New York, one count of conspiring to distribute and manufacture cocaine knowing it would be unlawfully imported into the United States. On that count, Barrera faces a maximum sentence of life in prison and a mandatory minimum sentence of 10 years in prison. In the Eastern District of New York, one count of conspiracy to launder money. On that count, Barrera faces a maximum sentence of 20 years in prison. In the Southern District of Florida with one count of conspiring to import cocaine into the United States and one count of conspiring to manufacture and distribute cocaine knowing that it would be unlawfully imported into the United States. On those counts, Barrera faces a maximum sentence of life in prison and a mandatory minimum sentence of 10 years in prison.

On November 20, 2014, Barrera pleaded guilty in the Southern District of New York to conspiring to distribute and manufacture over 400 tons of cocaine per year knowing that it would be imported into the United States. Barrera previously pleaded guilty in the Eastern District of New York to money laundering charges.

July 25, 2016, Barrera was sentenced to 35 years in prison and ordered to forfeit $10,000,000.
