= Daniel Rendón Herrera =

Colombian drug lord (born 1966)

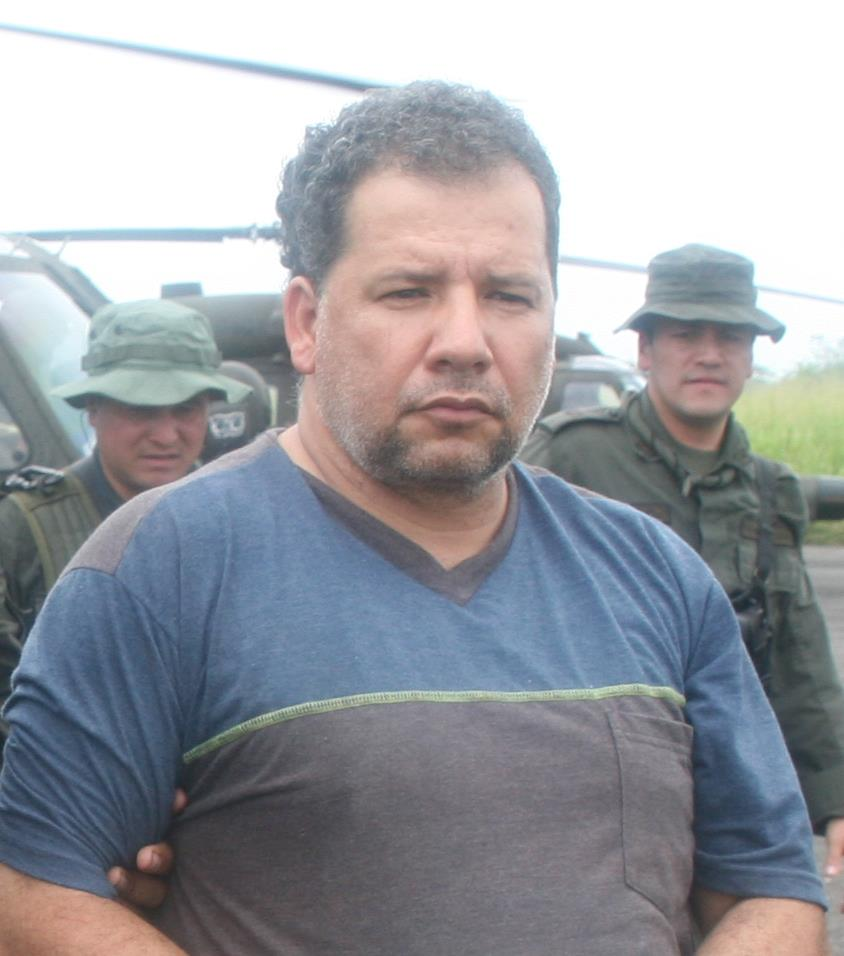
Rendón Herrera after being captured by the Colombian police.

Daniel Rendón Herrera (alias Don Mario; born 1966) is a Colombian drug lord. He was captured on 15 April 2009 while hiding in a jungle.

Rendón Herrera once led the Los Gaitanistas drug trafficking paramilitary gang, formerly known as Auto-defensas Gaitanistas (Gaitanist Self-Defence Group), and founding member of the "Los Urabeños" criminal gang.

== Biography ==
Rendón Herrera was born in 1966 in Antioquia to a poor family, one of 14 children. One of his brothers is former paramilitary leader Freddy Rendón-Herrera, alias "El Aleman" ("The German")

Daniel Rendón Herrera was second in command, after his brother, of the Elmer Cárdenas block of the ACCU (Peasant Self-Defense Forces of Córdoba and Urabá), a paramilitary group that belonged to the AUC (United Self Defense Forces of Colombia). He was friend of Carlos Castaño Gil, who was the top commander of the AUC; and in his honor named one of his organizations, called Heroes of Castaño, that later became a block of a new narco-paramilitary organization, created by himself, the AGC (Gaitanist Self-Defense Forces of Colombia), in which took command of 400 men in the Urabá region, and controlled the drug traffic, through alliances made with the guerrillas.

== Capture, extradition and trial ==
Daniel Rendón Herrera ('Don Mario') was captured in 2009 by the Colombian National Police and was finally extradited to the United States in 2018. He admitted to trafficking more than 80 tons of cocaine, pleaded guilty in a federal court. He was sentenced by the federal court in Brooklyn to 35 years’ imprisonment for engaging in a continuing criminal enterprise as a leader of the paramilitary, multibillion-dollar drug organization known as the Clan del Golfo and 15 years’ imprisonment for conspiring to provide material support to a designated foreign terrorist organization, the Autodefensas Unidas de Colombia (AUC).
