= Noreán Formation =

Early Jurassic geological formation in northern Colombia

- Stratigraphic range: Sinemurian-Toarcian; 194.6–174.8 Ma
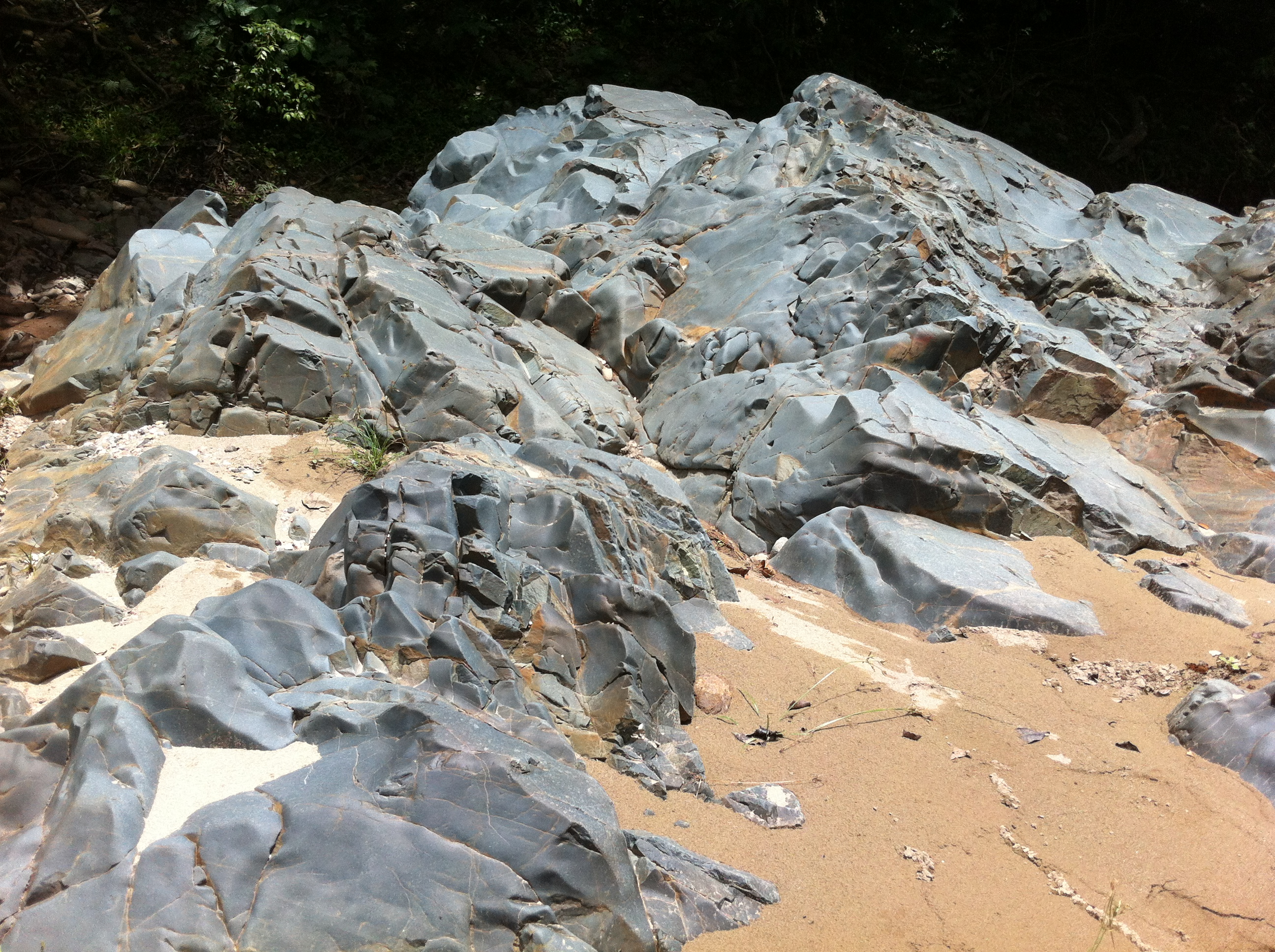
- Outcrop of the Effusive Rhyolitic Unit (Jner) south of Pailitas, Cesar
- Type: Geological formation
- Sub-units: See text
- Underlies: Tablazo & La Luna Formations
- Overlies: Bocas, Morrocoyal & Sudán Formations; Norosí Batholith, San Lucas & Bucaramanga Gneiss
- Thickness: 2,062 m (6,765 ft)

Lithology
- Primary: Andesitic-rhyolitic lavas & pyroclastics
- Other: Ignimbrites, thin sandstones

Location
- Coordinates: 8°00′00″N 74°00′00″W
- Region: Bolívar, Cesar & Santander
- Country: Colombia
- Extent: Serranía de San Lucas & Eastern Ranges, Andes; VIM & VMM (subsurface)

Type section
- Named for: Caserío Noreán
- Named by: Clavijo
- Location: Aguachica
- Year defined: 1995
- Coordinates: 8°22′54″N 73°36′38″W
- Region: Cesar
- Country: Colombia
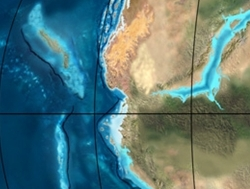
- Paleogeography of Northern South America; 200 Ma, by Ron Blakey

The Noreán Formation (Spanish: Formación Noreán, J1-2n, J1n) is a geological formation of the Eastern Ranges of the Colombian Andes, the Serranía de San Lucas and as basement underlying the southernmost Lower and northern Middle Magdalena Valleys. The formation consists of volcanic and pyroclastic lavas that range from andesites to rhyolites. Vitric, lithic and crystal tuffs and andesitic dikes and hypabyssal bodies are also present in the formation.

The more than 2,000 metres (6,600 ft) thick formation was deposited in a continental arc magmatic setting in an Early Jurassic graben that presently forms the basement of the Middle Magdalena Valley (VMM). A positive anomaly of Pb suggests a subduction-related genesis dominated by explosive volcanism.

== Etymology ==
The Noreán Formation was first defined as the "Unidad Volcanoclástica de Noreán" ("Volcanoclastic Unit of Noreán") in 1995 and in the same year elevated to a formal formation by Clavijo in 1995 as part of the geologic mapping for Plancha 65 Tamalameque and named after the caserío Noreán, 1 kilometre (0.62 mi) north of Aguachica, Cesar. The type locality of the Noreán Formation is along the road between Buturama and Bombeadero in Aguachica.

== Description ==
The Noreán Formation is found in the northern part of the Eastern Ranges of the Colombian Andes, stretching from the Cesar Department in the north, towards the Serranía de San Lucas in Bolívar to the Santander Massif in Santander in the south. The formation forms the economic basement in the southern Lower Magdalena Valley (VIM) and the northern Middle Magdalena Valley (VMM). The formation is interpreted as characteristic of an important explosive volcanic phase, the materials of which were deposited in a graben setting of the Middle Magdalena Valley. The Early Jurassic basin was covered by a shallow sea and in part drained by rivers and lakes. The basin at time of deposition was bordered by a volcanic arc, characterized by basaltic to calc-alkaline magmas. The formation also comprises less than 1 metre (3.3 ft) thin very fine to fine sandstone beds constituting quartz (90 to 60%), feldspars (10 to 40%) and lithic fragments (1-2 %).

The volcanic and pyroclastic rocks of the Noreán Formation are composed of lavas that range from andesitic to rhyolitic, together with vitric, lithic and crystal tuffs. Mainly andesitic dikes and hypabyssal bodies are also present. Geochemically, the volcanic and pyroclastic rocks exhibit chemical similarities, belong to the calc-alkaline series and have negative anomalies of Nb, P and Ti and a positive anomaly of Pb, suggesting a subduction-related genesis.

U-Pb zircon geochronology resulted in ages of 192.4 ± 2.2 Ma in a basaltic andesite, 184.9 ± 2.0 Ma in an andesitic lava and 175.9 ± 1.1 Ma in a rhyolitic lava, indicating the occurrence of volcanic events in this section of the Noreán Formation from the Lower to the earliest Middle Jurassic. Zircon inheritance suggests that the volcanic arc was emplaced in a Meso- to Neoproterozoic basement. The Noreán Formation represents continental arc magmatism, which occurred during a phase of extensional tectonics along the continental margin of northwestern South America from approximately 195 to 168 Ma.

=== Stratigraphy ===
To the northwest of the Santander Massif, the formation overlies the Bocas Formation and is unconformably overlain by the Tablazo Formation. In some locations in this area, the formation is found in faulted contact with the Bucaramanga Gneiss, La Virgen Formation and the Tablazo and La Luna Formations. In the Serranía de San Lucas, the Noreán Formation conformably overlies the Morrocoyal Formation and in this area is overlain by the Tablazo Formation and the Arenal Conglomeratic Unit. Across the San Lucas mountains, the formation is in faulted and discordant contact with the Norosí Batholith, the San Lucas Gneiss and the Sudán Formation.

The formation is offset by the megaregional Bucaramanga-Santa Marta Fault.

=== Subdivision ===
On the western flanks of the Eastern Cordillera, the formation is subdivided into six units and in the Serranía de San Lucas into four (1, 3, 5 and 6 of the six named below), from young to old:

1. Hypobyssal Andesitic Unit (Jnha) - 12 metres (39 ft)
2. Effusive Rhyolitic Unit (Jner) - 150 metres (490 ft)
3. Dacitic Effusive Unit (Jned) - 350 metres (1,150 ft)
4. Pyroclastic and Effusive Dacitic Unit (Jnpd) - 450 metres (1,480 ft)
5. Effusive Spherulitic Unit (Jnee) - 300 metres (980 ft)
6. Pyroclastic-epiclastic Unit (Jnpe) - 800 metres (2,600 ft)

=== Age ===
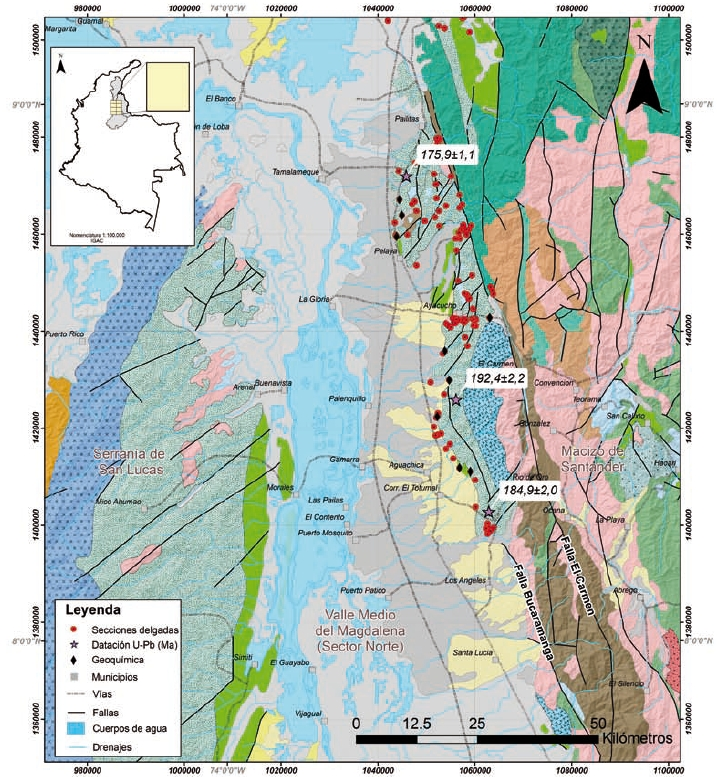
Geologic map of the northern VMM and Santander Massif with the Noreán Formation in light purple. U-Pb dating sites with associated ages are indicated.

The age of the Noreán Formation has been established using potassium-argon (K-Ar), rubidium-strontium (Rb-Sr), and uranium-lead dating (U-Pb). The first method gave an age range of 194 ± 6 Ma, the Rb-Sr dating method provided a range of 161 ± 27 Ma and U-Pb dating of zircons resulted in ages of 201.6 ± 3.6 and 196.1 ± 4.4. Refined dating of the formation performed in 2019 by Correa Martínez et al. concluded an age range between 192.4 ± 2.2 and 175.9 ± 1.1 Ma, spanning most of the Early Jurassic, from Sinemurian to Toarcian. The Noreán Formation was intruded by the San Lucas Granitoid in the Middle Jurassic, dated at 166.9 ± 6 Ma. A 2020 thermochronological study concluded that the Jurassic volcanic rocks covering the Santander Massif were exhumed during the latest Cretaceous to early Paleocene.

=== Outcrops ===
The northernmost outcrop of the Noreán Formation is found in Chimichagua, Cesar. In Cesar, outcrops occur south of the village of Saloa and around the town of Pailitas, east of Tamalameque and Pelaya and west of La Gloria, in the western part of Morales, Bolívar, north and east of Aguachica where its type locality is situated, in the Serranía de San Lucas, where the urban center of Santa Rosa del Sur rests on top of the formation, in the west of San Pablo, Bolívar, and in the western part of Cantagallo, Bolívar.

== Regional correlations ==
In the Santander Massif, the Noreán Formation has been correlated to the Jordán Formation, while in the Serranía de San Lucas the formation correlates with and is partly overlying the Morrocoyal Formation. In the Sierra Nevada de Santa Marta of northern Colombia, the Noreán Formation is considered equivalent with the Guatapurí Formation, the Corual and Los Indios Formations and the ignimbrite complexes of Caja de Ahorros, La Paila and La Piña. In the Serranía del Perijá to the east of the extent of the formation, the Noreán Formation correlates with La Quinta Formation. In the La Guajira peninsula, the formation is time-equivalent with the Rancho Grande Formation while to the south of its area in the Upper Magdalena Valley the Noreán Formation is correlated with the Saldaña Formation. The Lower Jurassic is missing in the Llanos Basin to the southeast of the extent of the Eastern Cordillera.

Stratigraphy of the Llanos Basin and surrounding provinces
Ma	Age	Paleomap	Regional events	Catatumbo	Cordillera	proximal Llanos	distal Llanos	Putumayo	VSM	Environments	Maximum thickness	Petroleum geology	Notes
0.01	Holocene		Holocene volcanism Seismic activity	alluvium								Overburden	
1	Pleistocene		Pleistocene volcanism Andean orogeny 3 Glaciations	Guayabo	Soatá; Sabana	Necesidad	Guayabo	Gigante Neiva		Alluvial to fluvial (Guayabo)	550 m (1,800 ft) (Guayabo)	Overburden	
2.6	Pliocene		Pliocene volcanism Andean orogeny 3 GABI	Guayabo	Subachoque	Necesidad	Guayabo	Gigante Neiva		Alluvial to fluvial (Guayabo)	550 m (1,800 ft) (Guayabo)	Overburden	
5.3	Messinian		Andean orogeny 3 Foreland	Guayabo	Marichuela	Necesidad	Guayabo	Caimán	Honda	Alluvial to fluvial (Guayabo)	550 m (1,800 ft) (Guayabo)	Overburden	
13.5	Langhian		Regional flooding	León	hiatus	Caja	León	Caimán	Honda	Lacustrine (León)	400 m (1,300 ft) (León)	Seal	
16.2	Burdigalian		Miocene inundations Andean orogeny 2	C1	hiatus	Carbonera C1		Ospina	Honda	Proximal fluvio-deltaic (C1)	850 m (2,790 ft) (Carbonera)	Reservoir	
17.3	Burdigalian		Miocene inundations Andean orogeny 2	C2	hiatus	Carbonera C2		Ospina	Honda	Distal lacustrine-deltaic (C2)	850 m (2,790 ft) (Carbonera)	Seal	
19	Burdigalian		Miocene inundations Andean orogeny 2	C3	hiatus	Carbonera C3		Ospina	Honda	Proximal fluvio-deltaic (C3)	850 m (2,790 ft) (Carbonera)	Reservoir	
21	Early Miocene		Pebas wetlands	C4	hiatus	Carbonera C4		Ospina	Barzalosa	Distal fluvio-deltaic (C4)	850 m (2,790 ft) (Carbonera)	Seal	
23	Late Oligocene		Andean orogeny 1 Foredeep	C5	hiatus	Carbonera C5		Orito		Proximal fluvio-deltaic (C5)	850 m (2,790 ft) (Carbonera)	Reservoir	
25	Late Oligocene		Andean orogeny 1 Foredeep	C6	hiatus	Carbonera C6		Orito		Distal fluvio-lacustrine (C6)	850 m (2,790 ft) (Carbonera)	Seal	
28	Early Oligocene		Andean orogeny 1 Foredeep	C7	hiatus	C7		Pepino	Gualanday	Proximal deltaic-marine (C7)	850 m (2,790 ft) (Carbonera)	Reservoir	
32	Oligo-Eocene		Andean orogeny 1 Foredeep	C8	Usme	C8	onlap	Pepino	Gualanday	Marine-deltaic (C8)	850 m (2,790 ft) (Carbonera)	Seal; Source	
35	Late Eocene		Andean orogeny 1 Foredeep	Mirador	Usme	Mirador		Pepino	Gualanday	Coastal (Mirador)	240 m (790 ft) (Mirador)	Reservoir	
40	Middle Eocene		Andean orogeny 1 Foredeep	Mirador	Regadera	Mirador		Pepino	hiatus	Coastal (Mirador)	240 m (790 ft) (Mirador)	Reservoir	
45	Middle Eocene		Andean orogeny 1 Foredeep	Mirador	Regadera	Mirador		Pepino	hiatus	Coastal (Mirador)	240 m (790 ft) (Mirador)	Reservoir	
50	Early Eocene		Andean orogeny 1 Foredeep	Socha	Regadera	Los Cuervos		Pepino	hiatus	Deltaic (Los Cuervos)	260 m (850 ft) (Los Cuervos)	Seal; Source	
55	Late Paleocene		PETM; 2000 ppm CO_{2}	Los Cuervos	Bogotá	Los Cuervos		Pepino	Gualanday	Deltaic (Los Cuervos)	260 m (850 ft) (Los Cuervos)	Seal; Source	
60	Early Paleocene		SALMA	Barco	Guaduas	Barco		Rumiyaco	Gualanday	Fluvial (Barco)	225 m (738 ft) (Barco)	Reservoir	
65	Maastrichtian		KT extinction	Catatumbo	Guadalupe			Rumiyaco	Monserrate	Deltaic-fluvial (Guadalupe)	750 m (2,460 ft) (Guadalupe)	Reservoir	
72	Campanian		End of rifting	Colón-Mito Juan	Guadalupe			Rumiyaco	Monserrate	Deltaic-fluvial (Guadalupe)	750 m (2,460 ft) (Guadalupe)	Reservoir	
83	Santonian		End of rifting	Colón-Mito Juan	Guadalupe			Villeta/Güagüaquí		Deltaic-fluvial (Guadalupe)	750 m (2,460 ft) (Guadalupe)	Reservoir	
86	Coniacian		End of rifting	Colón-Mito Juan	Guadalupe			Villeta/Güagüaquí		Deltaic-fluvial (Guadalupe)	750 m (2,460 ft) (Guadalupe)	Reservoir	
89	Turonian		Cenomanian-Turonian anoxic event	La Luna	Chipaque	Gachetá	hiatus	Villeta/Güagüaquí		Restricted marine (all)	500 m (1,600 ft) (Gachetá)	Source	
93	Cenomanian		Rift 2	La Luna	Chipaque	Gachetá	hiatus	Villeta/Güagüaquí		Restricted marine (all)	500 m (1,600 ft) (Gachetá)	Source	
100	Albian		Rift 2	La Luna	Une	Une	hiatus	Caballos		Deltaic (Une)	500 m (1,600 ft) (Une)	Reservoir	
113	Aptian		Rift 2	Capacho	Fómeque	Une	hiatus	Motema	Yaví	Open marine (Fómeque)	800 m (2,600 ft) (Fómeque)	Source (Fóm)	
125	Barremian		High biodiversity	Aguardiente	Paja	Une	hiatus	Motema	Yaví	Shallow to open marine (Paja)	940 m (3,080 ft) (Paja)	Reservoir	
129	Hauterivian		Rift 1	Tibú- Mercedes	Las Juntas	hiatus	hiatus	Motema	Yaví	Deltaic (Las Juntas)	910 m (2,990 ft) (Las Juntas)	Reservoir (LJun)	
133	Valanginian		Rift 1	Río Negro	Cáqueza; Macanal; Rosablanca	hiatus	hiatus	Motema	Yaví	Restricted marine (Macanal)	2,935 m (9,629 ft) (Macanal)	Source (Mac)	
140	Berriasian		Rift 1	Girón	Cáqueza; Macanal; Rosablanca	hiatus	hiatus	Motema	Yaví	Restricted marine (Macanal)	2,935 m (9,629 ft) (Macanal)	Source (Mac)	
145	Tithonian		Break-up of Pangea	Jordán	Arcabuco	Buenavista Batá	hiatus	Saldaña		Alluvial, fluvial (Buenavista)	110 m (360 ft) (Buenavista)	"Jurassic"	
150	Early-Mid Jurassic		Passive margin 2	La Quinta	Montebel Noreán	hiatus	hiatus	Saldaña		Coastal tuff (La Quinta)	100 m (330 ft) (La Quinta)	"Jurassic"	
201	Late Triassic		Passive margin 2	Mucuchachi	Montebel Noreán	hiatus	hiatus	Payandé				"Jurassic"	
235	Early Triassic		Pangea		hiatus	hiatus	hiatus					"Paleozoic"	
250	Permian		Pangea		hiatus	hiatus	hiatus					"Paleozoic"	
300	Late Carboniferous		Famatinian orogeny		hiatus	hiatus	hiatus		Cerro Neiva ()			"Paleozoic"	
340	Early Carboniferous		Fossil fish Romer's gap		Cuche (355-385)	Farallones ()			Cerro Neiva ()	Deltaic, estuarine (Cuche)	900 m (3,000 ft) (Cuche)	"Paleozoic"	
360	Late Devonian		Passive margin 1	Río Cachirí (360-419)	Cuche (355-385)	Farallones ()			Ambicá ()	Alluvial-fluvial-reef (Farallones)	2,400 m (7,900 ft) (Farallones)	"Paleozoic"	
390	Early Devonian		High biodiversity	Floresta (387-400) El Tíbet					Ambicá ()	Shallow marine (Floresta)	600 m (2,000 ft) (Floresta)	"Paleozoic"	
410	Late Silurian		Silurian mystery	Floresta (387-400) El Tíbet								"Paleozoic"	
425	Early Silurian		Silurian mystery	hiatus								"Paleozoic"	
440	Late Ordovician		Rich fauna in Bolivia	San Pedro (450-490)		Duda ()						"Paleozoic"	
470	Early Ordovician		First fossils	San Pedro (450-490)	Busbanzá (>470±22) Chuscales Otengá	Guape ()		Río Nevado ()	Hígado () Agua Blanca; Venado (470-475)			"Paleozoic"	
488	Late Cambrian		Regional intrusions	Chicamocha (490-515)	Quetame ()	Ariarí ()		SJ del Guaviare (490-590)	San Isidro ()			"Paleozoic"	
515	Early Cambrian		Cambrian explosion		Quetame ()			SJ del Guaviare (490-590)	San Isidro ()			"Paleozoic"	
542	Ediacaran		Break-up of Rodinia		pre-Quetame		post-Parguaza	SJ del Guaviare (490-590)	El Barro ()	Yellow: allochthonous basement (Chibcha terrane); Green: autochthonous basement (Río Negro-Juruena Province)		Basement	
600	Neoproterozoic		Cariri Velhos orogeny	Bucaramanga (600-1400)	pre-Quetame		post-Parguaza	pre-Guaviare	El Barro ()	Yellow: allochthonous basement (Chibcha terrane); Green: autochthonous basement (Río Negro-Juruena Province)		Basement	
800	Neoproterozoic		Snowball Earth	Bucaramanga (600-1400)	pre-Quetame		post-Parguaza	pre-Guaviare	El Barro ()	Yellow: allochthonous basement (Chibcha terrane); Green: autochthonous basement (Río Negro-Juruena Province)		Basement	
1000	Mesoproterozoic		Sunsás orogeny	Bucaramanga (600-1400)	pre-Quetame	Ariarí (1000)	post-Parguaza	pre-Guaviare	La Urraca (1030-1100)	Yellow: allochthonous basement (Chibcha terrane); Green: autochthonous basement (Río Negro-Juruena Province)		Basement	
1300	Mesoproterozoic		Rondônia-Juruá orogeny	Bucaramanga (600-1400)	pre-Quetame	pre-Ariarí	Parguaza (1300-1400)	pre-Guaviare	Garzón (1180-1550)	Yellow: allochthonous basement (Chibcha terrane); Green: autochthonous basement (Río Negro-Juruena Province)		Basement	
1400	Mesoproterozoic		Rondônia-Juruá orogeny	pre-Bucaramanga	pre-Quetame	pre-Ariarí		pre-Guaviare	Garzón (1180-1550)	Yellow: allochthonous basement (Chibcha terrane); Green: autochthonous basement (Río Negro-Juruena Province)		Basement	
1600	Paleoproterozoic		Rondônia-Juruá orogeny	pre-Bucaramanga	pre-Quetame	pre-Ariarí	Maimachi (1500-1700)	pre-Guaviare	pre-Garzón	Yellow: allochthonous basement (Chibcha terrane); Green: autochthonous basement (Río Negro-Juruena Province)		Basement	
1800	Paleoproterozoic		Tapajós orogeny	pre-Bucaramanga	pre-Quetame	pre-Ariarí	Mitú (1800)	pre-Guaviare	pre-Garzón	Yellow: allochthonous basement (Chibcha terrane); Green: autochthonous basement (Río Negro-Juruena Province)		Basement	
1950	Paleoproterozoic		Transamazonic orogeny	pre-Bucaramanga	pre-Quetame	pre-Ariarí	pre-Mitú	pre-Guaviare	pre-Garzón	Yellow: allochthonous basement (Chibcha terrane); Green: autochthonous basement (Río Negro-Juruena Province)		Basement	
2200	Paleoproterozoic		Columbia	pre-Bucaramanga	pre-Quetame	pre-Ariarí	pre-Mitú	pre-Guaviare	pre-Garzón	Yellow: allochthonous basement (Chibcha terrane); Green: autochthonous basement (Río Negro-Juruena Province)		Basement	
2530	Archean		Carajas-Imataca orogeny	pre-Bucaramanga	pre-Quetame	pre-Ariarí	pre-Mitú	pre-Guaviare	pre-Garzón	Yellow: allochthonous basement (Chibcha terrane); Green: autochthonous basement (Río Negro-Juruena Province)		Basement	
3100	Archean		Kenorland	pre-Bucaramanga	pre-Quetame	pre-Ariarí	pre-Mitú	pre-Guaviare	pre-Garzón	Yellow: allochthonous basement (Chibcha terrane); Green: autochthonous basement (Río Negro-Juruena Province)		Basement	

Legend

- group
- important formation
- fossiliferous formation
- minor formation
- (age in Ma)
- proximal Llanos (Medina) (Note: based on Duarte et al. (2019), García González et al. (2009), and geological report of Villavicencio)
- distal Llanos (Saltarin 1A well) (Note: based on Duarte et al. (2019) and the hydrocarbon potential evaluation performed by the UIS and ANH in 2009)

== See also ==
- Geology of the Altiplano Cundiboyacense
- Geology of the Eastern Hills
- Cesar-Ranchería Basin, sedimentary basin to the northeast of the Noreán extent
- Central Atlantic magmatic province, megaregional igneous province of the Early Jurassic
- Nacientes del Biobío Formation, contemporaneous volcanic formation of central Chile and western Argentina
- Pan de Azúcar Formation, contemporaneous volcanic formation of northern Chile
