= History of Valledupar =

The History of Valledupar (Spanish: Historia de Valledupar) refers to the historical events related to the Colombian city of Valledupar. The region of what is now Valledupar was prior to the Spanish conquest of the Americas inhabited by numerous Indigenous tribes pertaining to three major languages; the Lokono, Kalina and Chibchas.

== Pre-Columbian ==
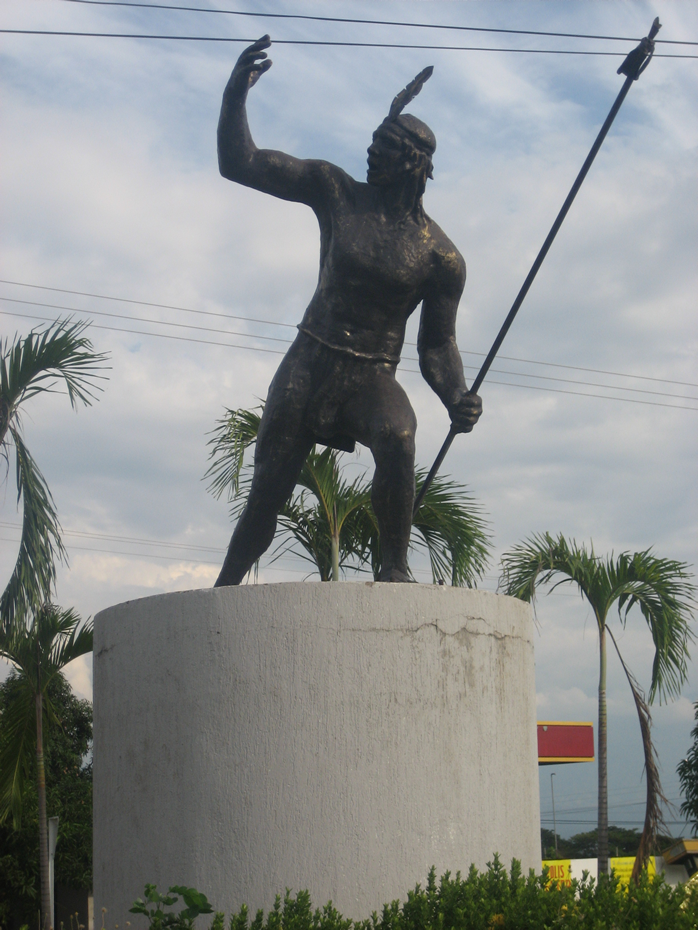
Statue in Valledupar honoring the Cacique Upar

The territory of what is now the municipality of Valledupar was inhabited predominantly by indigenous peoples pertaining to the Chimila, sharing the same language and culture (Euparies, Cariachiles, Pocabuyes, Sucuigas, Guanaos, Socuigas, Garupares, Chiriguanaes, Malibues, Sondaguas, Tamalameques, Itotos, etc.) and to a lesser extent to the Tupes, which were a mixture between immigrating Kalina peoples and the Chimila. Their territory extended between the central region of the Guajira Peninsula to the Magdalena River between the Sierra Nevada de Santa Marta and the Serranía del Perijá mountain ranges, covering most of the Valley of the Cesar River (also referred to as Valley of Upar or Valley of the Pocabuys).

There were two major cities in the region one was called Thamara (present-day Tamalameque) and the other was Upari named after their powerful chief. the cacique Upar. The Spanish scribes described Thamara as a very large city with more than a thousand huts. The Chimila society was structured in a pyramidal structure with a working class divided into fishers, hunters, artisans, miners, goldsmiths and merchants. The Chimila used Archuaco as their slaves. The Chimila believed in an immortal figure called Masirguta and were monotheist believing in the god Narayajana (also referred to as Yao). Chimila were practiced musical rites with drums of many sizes, flutes with a tip made out of wax varying in between two and five holes, imitated the singing of the rufous-vented chachalaca birds with an instrument called guacharaca and maracas.

The Chimila cultivated the maize in a technical manner and to a lesser extend other local species of vegetables and fruits for consumption and certain trees near their huts to produces shadows and freshen their area. Chimila also harvested the Gynerium sagittatum, a cane used to produce bows and arrows.

== Spanish conquest and colonization ==
The Spanish expedition led by Alonso de Ojeda, Amerigo Vespucci and Juan de la Cosa arrived to the coast of the Guajira Peninsula in 1499. In a second voyage bordered the coast southwest as further as to the gulf of Urabá. In 1501 Rodrigo de Bastidas repeated the trip along Juan de la Cosa but upon their return to Spain he was incarcerated along Christopher Columbus. The village of Santa Marta was founded on July 29, 1525. A year before Rodrigo de Bastidas signed a capitulation with the King of Spain on November 6, 1524 establishing himself as the first governor of Santa Marta.

=== Discovery ===
The first Spanish to arrive in the area was Pedro de Vadillo in 1528 arriving from Santa Marta.

=== Conquest and foundation ===
The foundation of Valledupar was ordered by Miguel Diez de Aramendiz in 1550.

Soon after the German conqueror Ambrosius Ehinger stormed the region coming from Coro after crossing the Serranía del Perijá mountain range. Ehinger savagely conquered the region burning down entires indigenous villages and taking the indigenous peoples as slaves. Ehinger burned down the villages of Eupari and Thamara, also sentenced to death the Cacique Upar.

== Independence from Spain ==
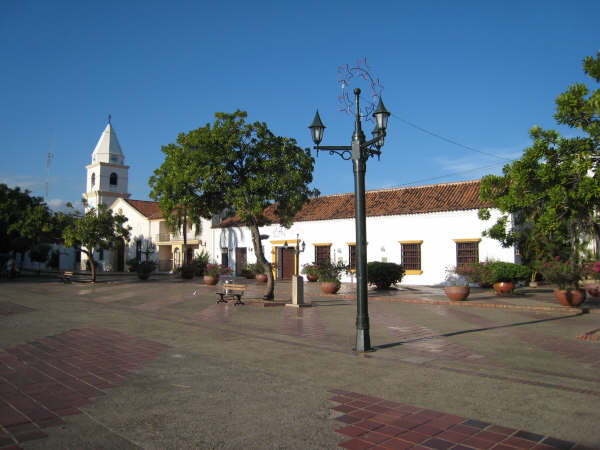
House of the scribe where the independence was signed in Valledupar's main plaza

On January 29, 1813, the Cabildo of Justice of Valledupar invited neighboring towns to elect their local town magistrates. The Cabildo was integrated by Antonio Fernandez de Castro, Jose Vicente Ustariz, Jose Vicente Maestre and Rafael Diaz Granados. On February 4, 1813 the Cabildo publicly declared the independence of Valledupar. Members of the Cabildo organized a committee which was to visit María Concepción Loperena who had direct contact with the leader of the independence movement Simón Bolívar. The Cabildo celebrated the independence at the house of the local Scrivener screaming hails to the President of the United Provinces of New Granada, Jorge Tadeo Lozano, and the President of Cartagena, Manuel Rodríguez Torices.

Jose Eugenio Garcia then asked the Cabildo to authorize a contingent of 200 troops to liberate the village of San Juan del Cesar. Andres Medina, grandson of the Cacique of La Guajira and loyal to the Spanish monarchy, confronted Garcia and the contingent from Valledupar, defeating them. News of the confrontation spread through the region, particularly in villages considered loyal to the Spanish crown such as Barrancas, Fonseca and Riohacha. On February 20, 1813 commissioners from these towns created Ayuntamientos in accordance with the Spanish constitution and protested against the events of Valledupar.
