= El Banco, Magdalena =

El Banco
- Municipality
- El Banco
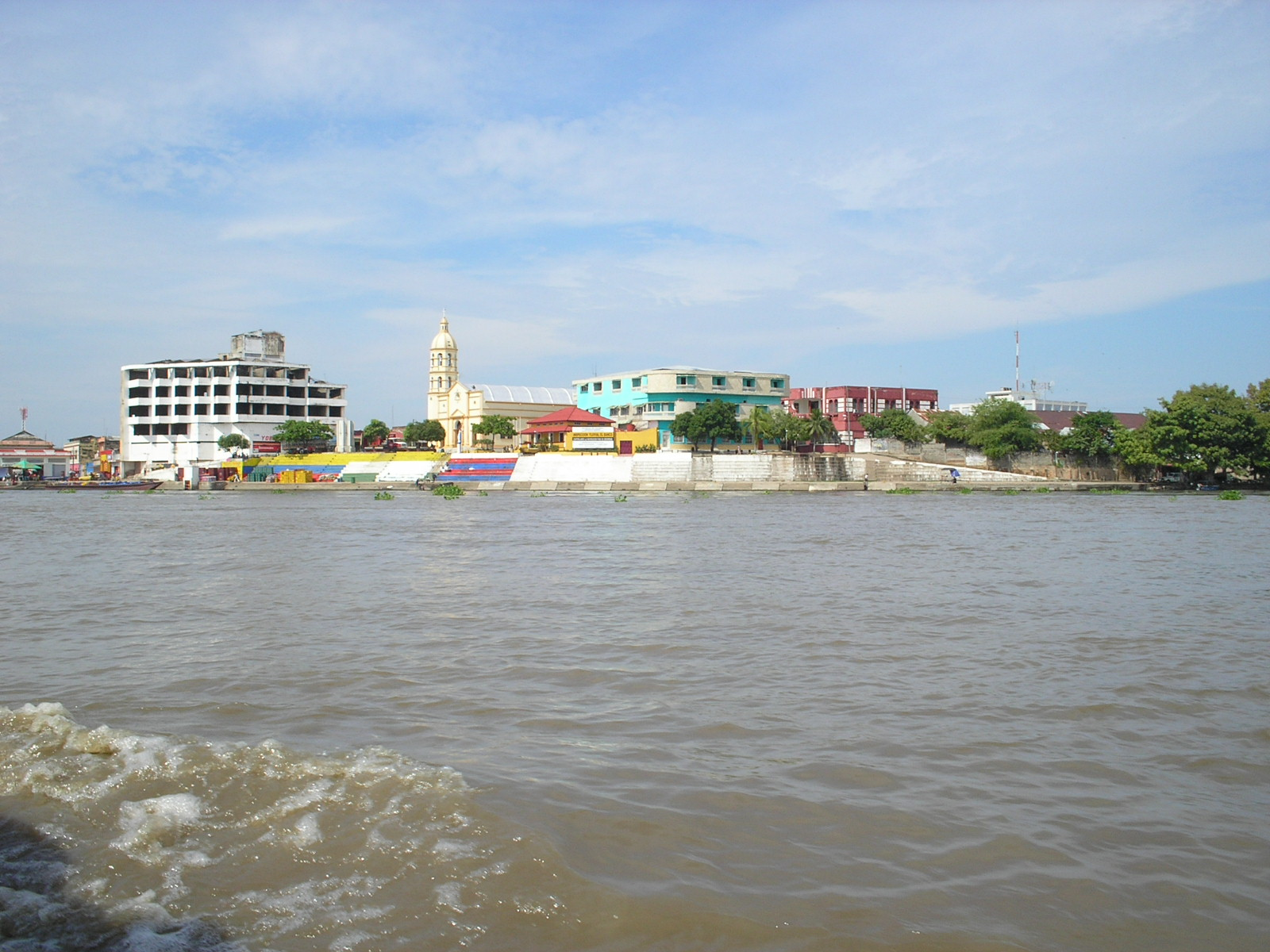
- View from the river

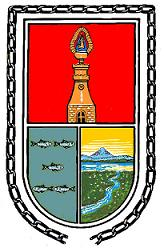
- Flag Coat of arms
- Nickname: Imperial City of Cumbia
- Coordinates: 8°59′54″N 73°58′29″W
- Country: Colombia
- Region: Caribbean
- Department: Magdalena
- Established: February 2, 1680
- Elevated to Municipality: 1871

Government
  - Mayor: Roy Enrique García Sánchez (2020-2024)

Area
  - Municipality: 820 km^{2} (320 sq mi)
  - Urban: 5.76 km^{2} (2.22 sq mi)
- Elevation: 25 m (82 ft)
- Highest elevation: 280 m (920 ft)
- Lowest elevation: 11 m (36 ft)

Population (2023 census)
  - Municipality: 72,131
  - Density: 88/km^{2} (230/sq mi)
  - Urban: 42,998
  - Urban density: 7,460/km^{2} (19,300/sq mi)
- Website: www.elbanco-magdalena.gov.co

El Banco (meaning "river bank" in Spanish), also called Cumbia Empire City, is a municipality of Colombia located in the southernmost part of the department of Magdalena, at the confluence of the Magdalena and Cesar River. It is part of the Depresión momposina. It is surrounded by the Zapatosa and Chilloa swamps.

== River ==
El Banco, Magdalena has a river named Magdalena River (Spanish name is Río Magdalena) has been a major commercial artery since the Spanish conquest. On keelboats, goods were transported from colonial times to the 19th century.

== Demographics ==
El Banco is the fifth most populated municipality in the department of Magdalena. According to DANE statistics (2023) the population of the municipality has 48,998 inhabitants in the municipal seat and 72,131 if the rural area is taken into account, representing 4.88% of the total of the department and 0.14% of the total Colombian population of which 49.61% are women, 50.39% men. 67.93% live in urban areas and 32.07% live in rural areas.

== Transport ==
In the city of El Banco, there is no public transportation system by automobile. Instead, motorcycles, private transport, and motorcycles predominate. This peculiarity distinguishes the city, as there are more motorcycles than automobiles on the streets. This situation creates a different traffic scenario than in other localities, where motorcycles are the preferred means of transportation for most residents.

The construction of the Roncador Bridge in Magangué on the Transversal Momposina road has generated congestion and deterioration in the main urban streets of the municipality, and repair work is currently underway on Calle Nueva, Carrera 13 and 15, in order to rehabilitate and improve the passage of heavy vehicles. However, the ideal would be the construction of a bypass to divert traffic from the urban area of El Banco.

=== Air Transportation ===
Las Flores Airport is not currently operational; it is only used for state or ambulance flights. Nearby airports are Hacaritama Airport (122 km away) and San Bernardo de Mompox Airport (73 km from El Banco).

State of National Route 43 that connects El Banco -Chimichagua -Astrea -El Paso to National Route 45.

=== Interurban transportation ===
The municipality has the El Banco Transport Terminal that maintains a constant direct flow of passengers and cargo with the metropolitan centers of Bogotá, Barranquilla, Bucaramanga and Santa Marta, An average of 350 buses are dispatched monthly from the terminal and the demand from nearby municipalities and townships is met by small companies that dispatch from the Plaza Almotacén and through river transport from the river port and the Plaza Almotacén. It should also be noted that it has a transport terminal which is the largest collection center for passengers arriving in this city.

=== River transportation ===
The municipality has river trips to Barrancabermeja, Magangué and others in southern Bolívar, Cesar and Magdalena.

== Main roads ==
- El Banco-Chimichagua-Cuatro Vientos (Route 43)
- El Banco-Guamal-Mompox (Route 78)
- El Banco-Tamalameque-El Burro (Route 78)

Calle 7, also known as the "Calle Nueva", is the main avenue of the municipality. This street starts from the road that connects El Banco with the municipality of Chimichagua, and from there it extends until it reaches the shore of the Magdalena River in the commercial area of the municipality.

There are also Carrera 15 (El Banco-Guamal-Mompox) and Carrera 13 (El Banco-Tamalameque-El Burro), these two start from Calle Nueva.

== Climate ==
El Banco has a tropical monsoon climate (Am). The average annual temperature is 30 °C, but during the hot season the temperature can exceed 39 °C and during the winter season it can drop to 24 °C, rarely dropping below 23 °C or rising above 40 °C. Relative humidity is 87% and in the rainy season up to 330 mm are collected. The predominant climates in this subregion are tropical rainy and tropical dry, the latter are characterized by two dry seasons and two rainy seasons. Summers in the municipality are short, hot, sultry, and dry, and winters are short, hot, oppressive, and wet.

In the year 2023, the shortest day in the municipality will be December 21, with only 11 hours and 36 minutes, and the longest day will be June 21, with 12 hours and 39 minutes.

Climate data for El Banco (Las Flores Airport), elevation 34 m (112 ft), (1981–2010)
Month	Jan	Feb	Mar	Apr	May	Jun	Jul	Aug	Sep	Oct	Nov	Dec	Year
Mean daily maximum °C (°F)	34.2 (93.6)	35.1 (95.2)	35.1 (95.2)	34.3 (93.7)	33.5 (92.3)	33.4 (92.1)	33.9 (93.0)	34.0 (93.2)	33.3 (91.9)	33.1 (91.6)	32.9 (91.2)	33.4 (92.1)	33.8 (92.8)
Daily mean °C (°F)	28.5 (83.3)	28.9 (84.0)	29.3 (84.7)	28.9 (84.0)	28.5 (83.3)	28.5 (83.3)	28.6 (83.5)	28.7 (83.7)	28.1 (82.6)	27.9 (82.2)	27.9 (82.2)	28.1 (82.6)	28.5 (83.3)
Mean daily minimum °C (°F)	22.3 (72.1)	23.0 (73.4)	23.5 (74.3)	23.3 (73.9)	23.4 (74.1)	23.5 (74.3)	23.4 (74.1)	23.3 (73.9)	23.0 (73.4)	23.0 (73.4)	23.1 (73.6)	22.7 (72.9)	23.1 (73.6)
Average precipitation mm (inches)	36.9 (1.45)	38.9 (1.53)	78.6 (3.09)	170.5 (6.71)	234.0 (9.21)	199.7 (7.86)	147.7 (5.81)	221.0 (8.70)	294.7 (11.60)	329.1 (12.96)	237.7 (9.36)	87.0 (3.43)	2,075.8 (81.72)
Average precipitation days	2	2	5	10	13	12	11	14	16	16	12	5	115
Average relative humidity (%)	71	69	70	73	76	77	75	75	77	78	78	75	74
Mean monthly sunshine hours	263.5	228.7	213.9	180.0	173.6	198.0	220.1	220.1	183.0	176.7	186.0	241.8	2,485.4
Mean daily sunshine hours	8.5	8.1	6.9	6.0	5.6	6.6	7.1	7.1	6.1	5.7	6.2	7.8	6.8
Source: Instituto de Hidrologia Meteorologia y Estudios Ambientales
