= Tourism in Cesar Department =

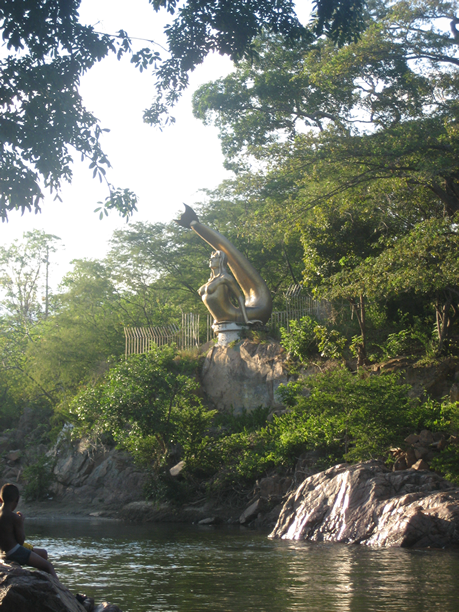
Monument honoring the Vallenata Siren Legend by the Guatapuri River in the outskirts of Valledupar. The Guatapurí River is one of the main attractions for tourists visiting the Department of Cesar.

Tourism in Cesar Department refers to the tourism in the Colombian Department of Cesar. Tourism developed primarily in Valledupar during the middle of the 20th century after the creation of Cesar Department, but had its precedents in religious peregrination during the Holy Week, Catholic Church tradition with peregrines going to Valledupar to celebrate processions, religious masses, saint of Ecce Homo veneration, the Virgen del Carmen, among others, these peregrinations were also popular in Atanquez a small village enclaved in the Sierra Nevada de Santa Marta, were the local culture inherited from the Spanish and Indigenous develop the "devil dancers" (La danza de los diablos).

With the popularization of the vallenato music, in 1968 the Vallenato Legend Festival was created to celebrate the a local legend. This festival became the major attraction for tourists in the Cesar Department and has been promoted by the local and national government as national attraction.

Another touristic attraction is the Sierra Nevada de Santa Marta with its variety of flora and fauna, it is also a National Natural Parks of Colombia and it is promoted as ecotouristic destination, the most popular destinations are the towns of Pueblo Bello, La Mina, Atanquez, and Nabusimake.

In the Sierra Nevada de Santa Marta another attraction is the Arhuaco indigenous culture with its traditions. In the corrgimiento of Valencia de Jesús there is one of the oldest churches in the Americas constructed by the Spanish. as well as numerous small towns in the department still preserve the colonial architecture, constructed by the Spanish colonizers that came as part of the Spanish colonization of the Americas.

== See also ==
- Festivities in Cesar Department
