= Harlis Alexis Murillo Moreno =

Colombian sex offender, murderer and suspected serial killer

- Born: September 1988 (age 38); Pizarro, Chocó, Colombia
- Convictions: Murder x1 Rape x2
- Penalty: 36 years imprisonment

Details
- Victims: 2–4
- Span of crimes: Unknown–2017
- Country: Colombia
- States: Valle del Cauca, Santander, possibly Bogotá
- Date apprehended: 2017
- Imprisoned at: Villahermosa Prison, Cali

Harlis Alexis Murillo Moreno (born September 1988) is a Colombian sex offender, murderer and suspected serial killer. According to the investigating authorities, Murillo Moreno is responsible for four murders and several sexual assaults perpetrated against the female population.

Harlis was convicted for the murder of physiotherapist Stephanie Andrea Ramírez Narváez in Cali, which occurred on June 4, 2017. In addition, he is suspected of three more murders: of Yuliana Gómez Quejada (July 1, 2017, in Bucaramanga), and another two murders in Bogotá, for which there is no available information.

== Crimes ==
At present, Murillo Moreno has been convicted solely for the murder of physiotherapist Stephanie Andrea Ramírez Narváez, which occurred in her Cali apartment on June 4, 2017. After failing to attend a meet-up with a patient, her body was found wrapped up in a mattress cover, in the recreational area of a residential complex. According to the National Institute of Legal Medicine and Forensic Sciences, the woman had been sexually assaulted and physically abused with a foreign object. Her death was ruled to be from asphyxiation.

The other known murder committed by him occurred between June and July 2017, at the Morgan Hotel in central Bucaramanga. At that time, 27-year-old Yuliana Gómez Quejada's body was found with signs of asphyxiation, much like Ramírez Narváez's injuries. The judicial authorities were able to determine that the murderer, whose suspicious behavior first alerted the staff members, was indeed Murillo Moreno, via checking the hotel's security cameras.

Finally, Colombian authorities have also accused him of perpetrating another two killings in Bogotá.

=== Sex crimes ===
In addition to the murders, Murillo Moreno also committed several sexual assaults. In his criminal record, there are several convictions for sexual abuse, including one committed against a minor.

He is believed to have committed one of the attacks in 2007, after being reported for raping a child. At that time, he was detained in Bogotá by the Attorney General's Office and charged, but acquitted and released the following year.

In April 2018, eight years later, Harlis was denounced once again for rape, this time against a married woman in Bogotá, from whom he had rented a room. On August 29, he was accused of yet another rape in the capital, this time against a woman whom he had befriended fifteen days before.

== Capture ==
He was finally captured in Aguachica, Cesar, while posing as a Panamanian national passing through the country, following a special sting operation by the Colombian authorities. For the femicide of Stephanie Andrea Ramírez Narváez, he was sentenced to 36 years imprisonment.

He is detained at the Villahermosa Prison, in Cali.

== See also ==
- List of serial killers by country
