= Víctor Roqueme Quiñonez =

Colombian politician (1998–2024)

Mayor of Aguachica
- In office 1 January 2024 – 20 August 2024

Senior Presidential Advisor for Reintegration
- President: Gustavo Petro
- Preceded by: Position established

Personal details
- Born: 1 February 1998 Cúcuta, Colombia
- Died: 20 August 2024 (aged 26) Bucaramanga, Colombia
- Occupation: Politician

Víctor Julio Roqueme Quiñonez (1 February 1998 – 24 August 2024) was a Colombian politician. He was elected mayor of Aguachica, Cesar in October 2023 and assumed office on 1 January 2024. He held the position as the youngest candidate.

Elected mayor of the city of Aguachica, in the department of César after emerging victorious in the 2023 Colombian regional elections.

== Biography ==
Quiñónez was born on 1 February 1998 and graduated as a civil engineer from the Francisco de Paula Santander University. Before occupying the first position in the municipality, he had no experience in similar positions. He died from leukemia at a hospital in Bucaramanga, on 24 August 2024, at the age of 26.
