= Morales Municipality =

Morales Municipality may refer to:

- Morales, Bolívar, Colombia
- Morales, Guatemala
