= Aguachica =

- Municipality and city
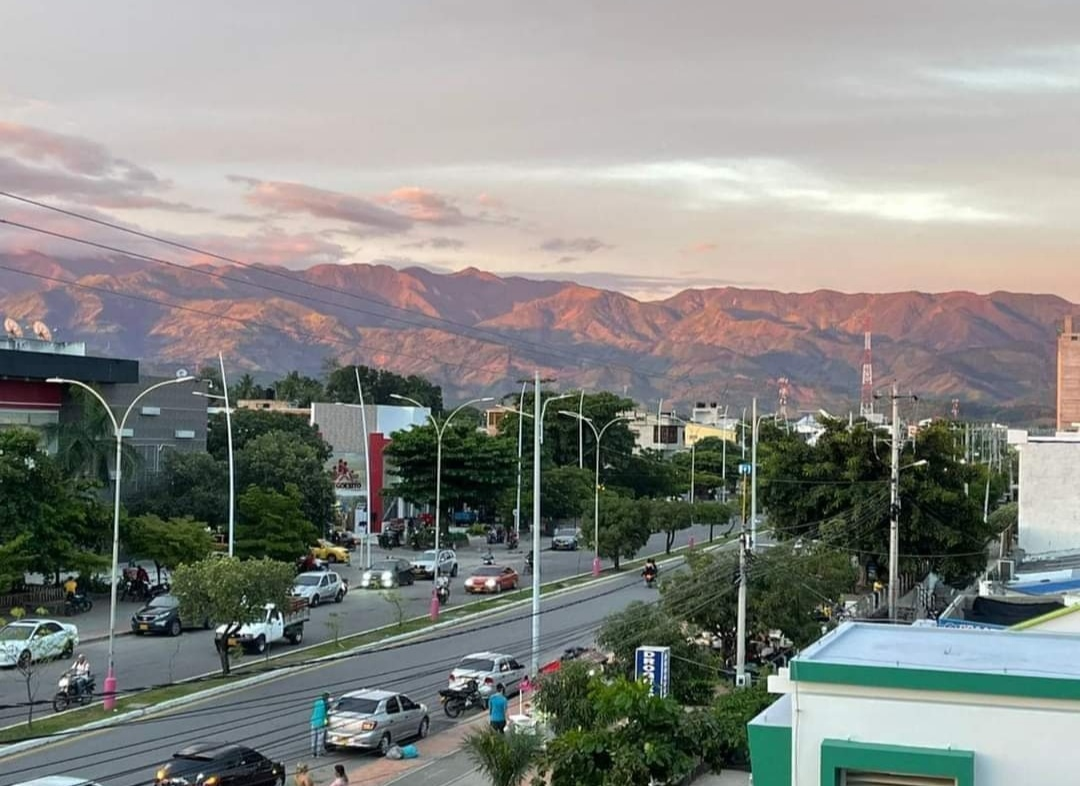

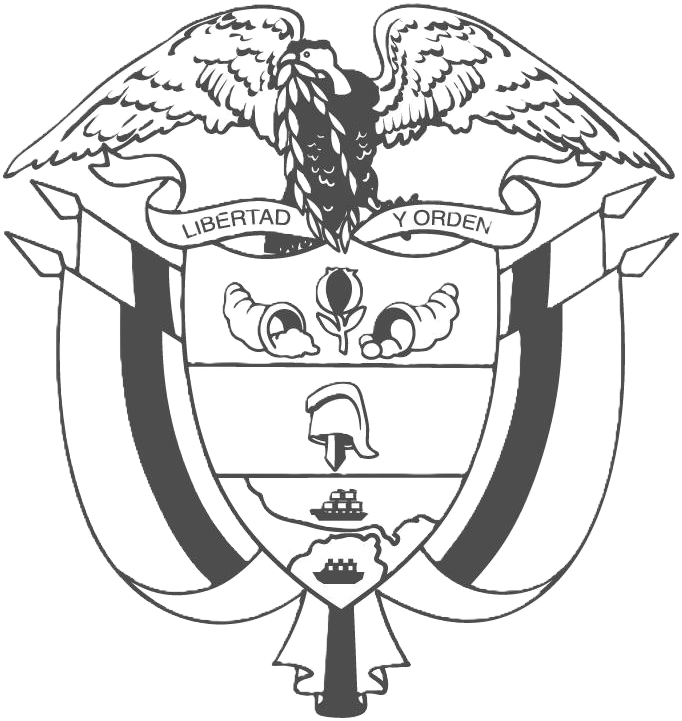
- Coat of arms

- Location in the Department of Cesar. Municipality (red), City (dark gray).

- Location within Colombia
- Coordinates: 8°18′45″N 73°37′37″W
- Country: Colombia
- Region: Caribbean
- Department: Cesar
- Foundation: August 16, 1748

Government
  - Mayor: Vacant

Area
  - Municipality and city: 877.7 km^{2} (338.9 sq mi)
  - Urban: 10.85 km^{2} (4.19 sq mi)
- Elevation: 162 m (531 ft)

Population (2020 est.)
  - Municipality and city: 118,652
  - Density: 135.2/km^{2} (350.1/sq mi)
  - Urban: 103,209
  - Urban density: 9,512/km^{2} (24,640/sq mi)
- Time zone: UTC-5
- Area code: 57 + 5
- Website: Official website (in Spanish)

Aguachica (Spanish pronunciation: [aɣwaˈtʃika]) is a city and municipality in the southern region of the Cesar Department, Colombia, located between the inter-Andean valley of Magdalena Medio and the Motilones. It is the second most populated municipality in the department and an important livestock and commercial center in the southeast of the Colombian Caribbean.

In terms of transportation infrastructure, its geographically strategic position connects the Colombian Caribbean with the Santanderes through the Ruta del Sol, and is also a key communication point for the Catatumbo region via National Route 70. It also has air transportation through the Hacaritama Airport, a railway system, and in parallel with the Magdalena River waterway through the port of Gamarra.

== Geography ==
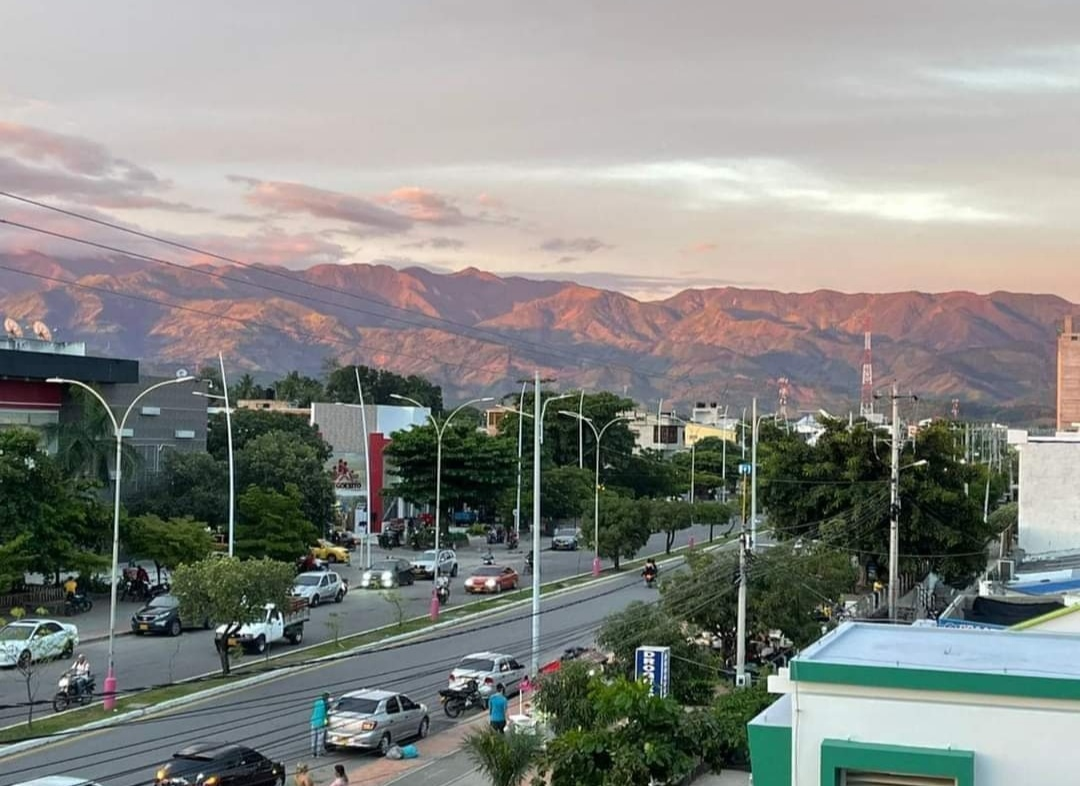
Serranía de Los Motilones from Aguachica

The municipality is located south of the Cesar Department, between the Cordillera Oriental Andean mountains and the Magdalena River. The municipality of Aguachica borders to the north with the municipality of La Gloria and the Department of North Santander (municipality of El Carmen); to the east with the municipality of Rio de Oro; to the south with Rio de Oro once again, with the municipality of San Martín and the Department of Santander (municipality of Puerto Wilches) and to the west with the municipality of Gamarra and the Department of Bolívar (municipality of Morales) covering a total area of 876 km^{2}, 3.8% of the total area of the Department of Cesar.

The northern area of the municipality is mountainous part of the Cordillera Oriental mountain range with altitude varying between the 200 m and 2,150 m over sea level. The southern area of the municipality of Aguachica is predominantly flat with two major rivers flowing through the region; the Magdalena River and the Lebrija River.

== History ==
=== Pre-Columbian ===
The territory of present-day Aguachica was inhabited by amerindian Chimila tribes, before the Spanish conquerors arrived. This tribe was later brutally decimated by the Spanish.

=== Spanish conquest and colonization ===
During the first decades of the 17th century, the area was established as the Hacienda de San Roque by the Spanish and was owned by Don Antonio Garia de Bonilla, but due to pests and illnesses the settlement was moved a few hundred meters to the south. By 1722 the settlement had grown in the middle of an hacienda predominantly owned by Don Casimiro Ramos de Barahona (also spelled Barahoja). The settlement was serving now as a rest area for merchants traveling to and from the nearby fluvial port town of Gamarra and Ocaña (present-day Department of North Santander).

In 1748, the settlement received the royal grant in favor of Jose Lazaro de Rivera and established as a Roman Catholic parish. By this time the Spanish conqueror Jose Fernando de Mier y Guerra was ordered to "pacify" the Chimila indigenous groups and to reorganize some villages in the basin of the Magdalena river. These foundations and re-foundations were approved back then by José Alfonso Pizarro viceroy of the Viceroyalty of New Granada between 1749 and 1753. In 1753 the Spanish ordered the construction of houses in Aguachica and was made part of the Government of Santa Marta.

Between 1798 and 1804 a plague swept most of the population causing the village to move to its present location. In 1914 became a municipality.

=== The Republic ===
By 1850 the first migrants arrived to Aguachica largely attracted by the plantations of coffee in neighboring Ocaña, Sovereign State of Santander and also introduced agricultural and farming practices for commerce in the region. During the 1920s, Petroleum deposits were found in the area triggering another wave of migrants mostly from the neighboring departments of Colombia; Antioquia, Caldas, Santander, North Santander and Boyaca.

During the 1950s the construction of the highway and the Magdalena railroad turned Aguachica into a strategic area between the Andean region and Caribbean region. The 1960s were marked by the migration of people from the Department of Tolima mostly farmers interested in exploiting the land, developing large plantations of cotton, sorghum, rice, among other products. The economy grew, developing an economy based on agricultural products, commerce and services.

==== Colombian armed conflict ====
During the 1980s and early 1990s the region was influenced by the Colombian armed conflict producing the displacement of people from the countryside and from neighboring regions of the southern Department of Bolívar and the Department of Cesar into the municipality seat. In Aguachica, the first Popular Consultation in Colombia was held. In August 1995, the city’s residents voted to answer the question: "Do you reject violence and agree to make Aguachica a model municipality of peace?". Aguachica ranked among the 15 municipalities most affected by kidnapping in Colombia between 1970 and 2010.

== Politics ==
=== Administrative divisions ===
The municipality of Aguachica is subdivided into Barrios, Corregimientos (9) and Veredas (64).

==== Corregimientos ====
Barranca de Lebrija, Buturama, Campo Amalia, El Juncal, Loma de Corredor, Norean, Puerto Patiño, Santa Lucía, Villa de San Andrés (El Totumal).

==== Veredas ====
Barcelona, Bombiadero, Cañada Ospina, Caracol, Costa Rica, El Corral, El Tope, Esmeralda Alta, Honduras, Cascabela, La Pajuila, La Ye, Las Bateas, Las Margaritas, Los Caliches, Los Llanos, Marinilla, Palmira, Peralonso, Soledad, Quebrada Seca, San Benito, San José, San Pablo, Santa Inés, Bella Vista, Campoalegre, Caño Caracolí, Cerro de los Bustos, El Carbón, El Faro, Esmeralda, Guaduas, La Bocatoma, Santo Domingo, La Unión, La Yegüerita, Las Latas, Las Piñas, Los Columpios, Maligüal, Palenquillo, Peñoncito, Planadas – Limoncito, Sabana de Caballeros, Puros Altos, San Francisco, San Lorenzo, San Pedro, La Ceiba, Cerro Bravo, La Morena, Las Adjuntas, Lucaicál, San Miguel, Santa Lucia, Villa Nueva, Boquerón, Cerro Redondo, La Campana, La Yegüera, Mucuras, Santa Bárbara, Santa Rosa.

== Heritage Sites ==
Aguachica has religious sites such as Cerro de la Cruz (lit. 'The Cross Hill') in which religious traditions are practiced and where the pilgrimage of parishioners from the municipality begins, in addition to the San Roque Parish, this building, built in the hacienda of the same name, is considered the starting point of the establishment of the church and history of Aguachica. In the book "Floresta de la Santa Iglesia Catedral de la Ciudad y Provincia de Santa Marta" by José Nicolás de la Rosa, which was written between 1736 and 1738, is one of the first records documenting the existence of the San Roque Parish. By 1748, Aguachica was officially assigned as a parish. Another religious temple in Aguachica is the Church of Maria Auxiliadora established by the Comboni Missionaries, who in 1992, entered Aguachica to accompany the population, in 2006, the structure of the church was completed and was handed over to the Diocese of Ocaña. Another heritage site is the Eladio Vargas Cultural Center, which is in charge of documenting and preserving the history, traditions, culture and folkloric aspects of Aguachica, which has been in existence for more than 18 years.

== Nature Reserves ==
Aguachica has a natural reserve of the Agüil Forest, which has 40 different species of butterflies and 88 types of birds. Currently the forest has 8 hectares in which there are 200 different species of plants. One of the main types of flowers found in the forest are Acalypha, Machaerium and Solanum.

== Demographics ==
In the 2005 Census by the DANE the municipality of Aguachica had a total population of 80,789.

The majority of the population 51% is female while 49% are male. Of these 0.1% considered itself of indigenous ancestry and 3.7% of Afro-Colombian ancestry.

87% of these 80,789 people living in houses, while 2.1% lived in apartment buildings and 10% in rented rooms. 4.8% of these homes were also used for home businesses. 90% of the municipality of Aguachica had electricity, 73% with sewage service, 87% had aqueduct services, 50% had natural gas services installed at home while 30% percent had a telephone line.

== Climate ==
Climate data for Aguachica (Aguas Claras), elevation 208 m (682 ft), (1981–2010)
| Month | Jan | Feb | Mar | Apr | May | Jun | Jul | Aug | Sep | Oct | Nov | Dec | Year |
|---|---|---|---|---|---|---|---|---|---|---|---|---|---|
| Mean daily maximum °C (°F) | 34.3 (93.7) | 35.0 (95.0) | 34.7 (94.5) | 33.3 (91.9) | 32.3 (90.1) | 32.2 (90.0) | 32.5 (90.5) | 32.6 (90.7) | 31.9 (89.4) | 31.4 (88.5) | 31.6 (88.9) | 32.7 (90.9) | 32.9 (91.2) |
| Daily mean °C (°F) | 29.2 (84.6) | 29.8 (85.6) | 29.7 (85.5) | 28.8 (83.8) | 28.3 (82.9) | 28.1 (82.6) | 28.3 (82.9) | 28.3 (82.9) | 27.9 (82.2) | 27.5 (81.5) | 27.8 (82.0) | 28.2 (82.8) | 28.5 (83.3) |
| Mean daily minimum °C (°F) | 23.2 (73.8) | 24.0 (75.2) | 24.4 (75.9) | 24.3 (75.7) | 23.9 (75.0) | 23.7 (74.7) | 23.5 (74.3) | 23.4 (74.1) | 23.2 (73.8) | 23.3 (73.9) | 23.4 (74.1) | 23.1 (73.6) | 23.6 (74.5) |
| Average precipitation mm (inches) | 16.9 (0.67) | 33.0 (1.30) | 49.7 (1.96) | 145.7 (5.74) | 190.5 (7.50) | 153.0 (6.02) | 124.8 (4.91) | 161.9 (6.37) | 189.7 (7.47) | 161.6 (6.36) | 104.1 (4.10) | 48.2 (1.90) | 1,372.8 (54.05) |
| Average precipitation days | 2 | 3 | 5 | 12 | 14 | 12 | 13 | 14 | 15 | 14 | 10 | 5 | 116 |
| Average relative humidity (%) | 74 | 70 | 72 | 77 | 82 | 82 | 80 | 80 | 81 | 82 | 82 | 78 | 78 |
| Mean monthly sunshine hours | 251.1 | 211.7 | 182.9 | 147.0 | 155.0 | 174.0 | 204.6 | 192.2 | 171.0 | 164.3 | 171.0 | 213.9 | 2,238.7 |
| Mean daily sunshine hours | 8.1 | 7.5 | 5.9 | 4.9 | 5.0 | 5.8 | 6.6 | 6.2 | 5.7 | 5.3 | 5.7 | 6.9 | 6.1 |
Source: Instituto de Hidrologia Meteorologia y Estudios Ambientales
