= González Municipality =

González Municipality may refer to:

- González Municipality, Tamaulipas
- González Municipality, Colombia
