= Ciénaga de Zapatosa =

Coordinates: 9°12′N 73°49′W

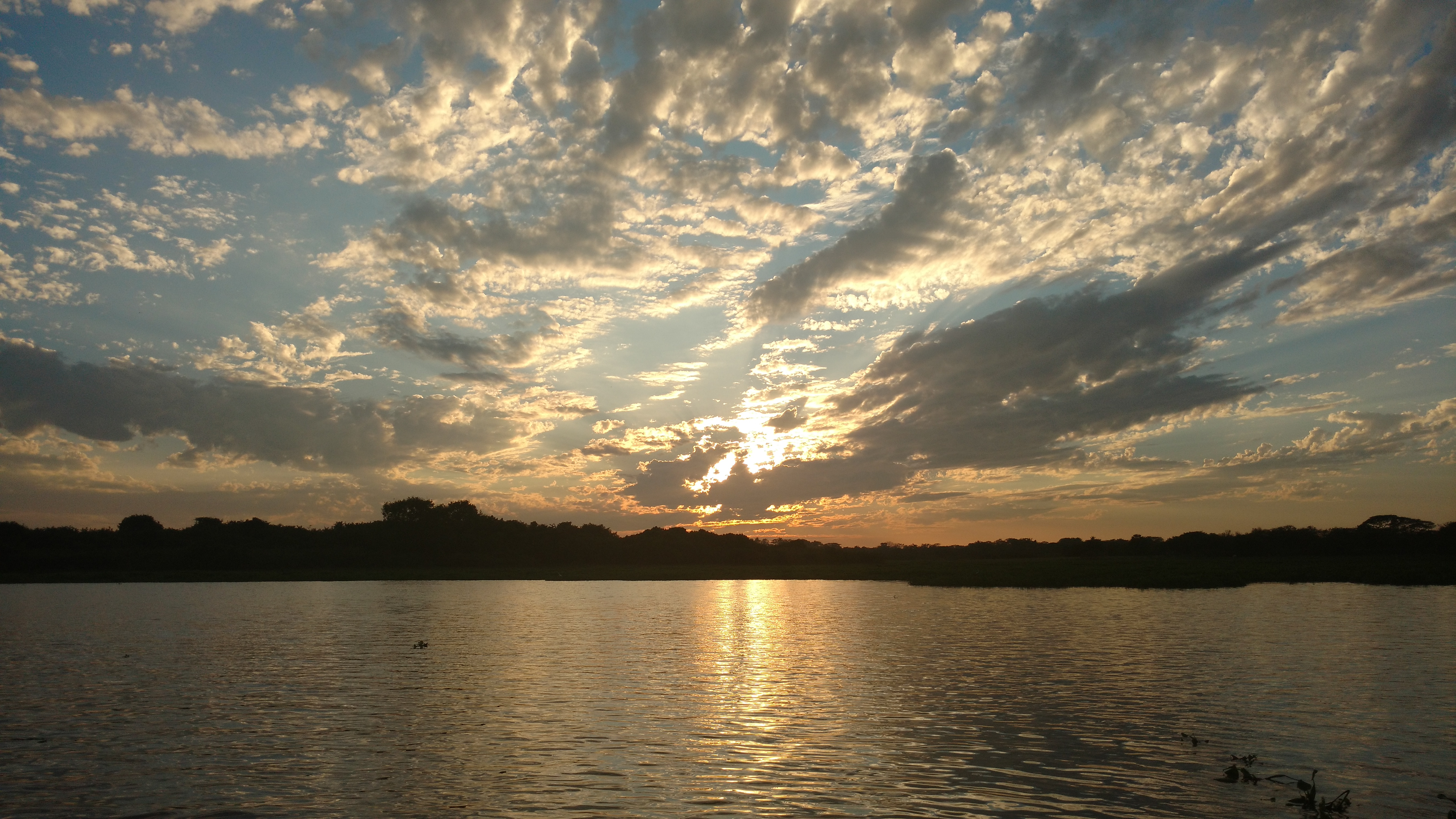
Ciénaga de Zapatosa

Ciénaga de Zapatosa (Zapatosa Marsh) is a large marsh in a depression located between the Colombian departments of Cesar and Magdalena covering an area of approximately 40,000 ha and containing one million cubic meters of water. The fresh water lake in the middle of the marsh varies with the seasons from 400 to 800 square miles (103,600 to 207,200 ha) in extent and from 20 to 25 feet (6 to 8 meters) deep.

The marshes are covered by the municipalities of Chimichagua, Curumaní, Tamalameque and El Banco, communities which based their economy in part from the artisan fishing practice.
