= La Gloria, Cesar =

Coordinates: 8°35′N 73°35′W

- Flag

- Location of the municipality and town of La Gloria in the Department of Cesar.
- Country: Colombia
- Region: Caribbean
- Department: Cesar
- Foundation: 1800

Government
  - Mayor: Fermín Cruz Romero (Convergencia Ciudadana)

Area
  - Total: 736 km^{2} (284 sq mi)

Population (Census 2018)
  - Total: 14,989
  - Density: 20.4/km^{2} (52.7/sq mi)
- Time zone: UTC-5
- Website: lagloria-cesar.gov.co

La Gloria is a municipality and town in the Department of Cesar, northern Colombia by the Magdalena River.

== Geography ==
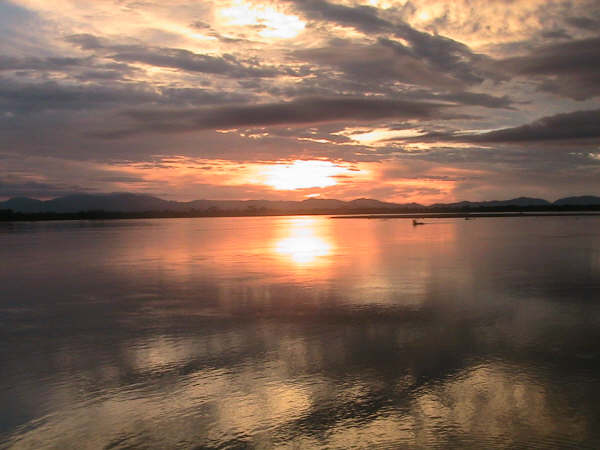
Sunset at La Gloria

La Gloria is situated to the Eastern margin of the Magdalena River, it borders the north with the municipalities of Tamalameque and Pelaya, the south with the municipalities of Gamarra and Aguachica, the West with the Bolívar Department and the east with the Norte de Santander Department. The municipality has been characterized as the bridge between the south of Cesar and the municipalities of the south of Bolívar. Travellers of this region of Bolivar must cross rio Magdalena, to take the highway La Gloria - La Mata.

== History ==
The town and municipality was initially founded by Benito Torices Bermudez, Juan Cruz Uribe, Gregorio Arias and Hermógenes Maza on December 8, 1800 with the name Corregimiento of Belén Belén part of the Municipality of Simaña. The town served as a supportive port for fluvial vessels carrying supplies and passengers over the Magdalena River. In 1888 the General Assembly of the Magdalena creates the current layout of Municipality and town of La Gloria by order 004 of July 1, 1888 and became part of the Padilla Province. In 1967 the municipality adheres to the Cesar Department.

== Economy ==
It is known for its small but growing fishing industry and its agricultural produces. The agricultural products that stand out in the municipality are rice, cultivated in the estates of the Properties Santa Ines and Bellacruz, as well as sorghum and other cereals to smaller scale. The planting of corn in Ayacucho and La Mata, like the fishing industry, is very well known at national level. At present, the rice cultures have been replaced in a 90% by extensive cultures of palm for the palm oil production.

== Transport ==
There are two airports in the municipality both owned and controlled by the Colombian state owned oil company Ecopetrol in the corregimientos of Simaña and Ayacucho.

La Gloria connects to the rest of the Cesar Department towns by a highway leading to the town of La Mata and a railway that connects to the main southern towns of the department. La Gloria railway station is considered by the Colombian Ministry of Culture as a place of national cultural interest.

The Magdalena River easily communicates with other cities over this river, the most important of them being Barranquilla.

== Climate ==
Climate data for La Gloria (Mata La), elevation 163 m (535 ft), (1971–2000)
| Month | Jan | Feb | Mar | Apr | May | Jun | Jul | Aug | Sep | Oct | Nov | Dec | Year |
|---|---|---|---|---|---|---|---|---|---|---|---|---|---|
| Mean daily maximum °C (°F) | 34.2 (93.6) | 34.7 (94.5) | 34.5 (94.1) | 33.9 (93.0) | 33.5 (92.3) | 33.6 (92.5) | 33.7 (92.7) | 33.5 (92.3) | 33.1 (91.6) | 32.8 (91.0) | 33.0 (91.4) | 33.5 (92.3) | 33.7 (92.7) |
| Daily mean °C (°F) | 28.5 (83.3) | 28.7 (83.7) | 28.6 (83.5) | 28.2 (82.8) | 27.9 (82.2) | 28.0 (82.4) | 28.1 (82.6) | 27.8 (82.0) | 27.4 (81.3) | 27.3 (81.1) | 27.5 (81.5) | 28.0 (82.4) | 28.0 (82.4) |
| Mean daily minimum °C (°F) | 22.2 (72.0) | 22.7 (72.9) | 22.7 (72.9) | 22.9 (73.2) | 22.7 (72.9) | 22.9 (73.2) | 22.6 (72.7) | 22.6 (72.7) | 22.3 (72.1) | 22.4 (72.3) | 22.4 (72.3) | 22.7 (72.9) | 22.6 (72.7) |
| Average precipitation mm (inches) | 36.2 (1.43) | 76.6 (3.02) | 137.8 (5.43) | 246.6 (9.71) | 373.1 (14.69) | 251.6 (9.91) | 187.8 (7.39) | 313.2 (12.33) | 481.7 (18.96) | 389.6 (15.34) | 297.1 (11.70) | 98.9 (3.89) | 2,890.1 (113.78) |
| Average precipitation days | 3 | 4 | 6 | 12 | 16 | 13 | 12 | 16 | 20 | 18 | 14 | 5 | 138 |
| Average relative humidity (%) | 75 | 73 | 74 | 77 | 79 | 80 | 77 | 79 | 79 | 80 | 80 | 78 | 78 |
Source: Instituto de Hidrologia Meteorologia y Estudios Ambientales
