= Chimila language =

Chibchan language spoken in Colombia

Chimila
- Ette taara
- Native to: Colombia
- Ethnicity: 1,500 Chimila people (2009)
- Native speakers: 350 (2009)
- Language family: Chibchan: Arwako–Chimila; Chimila

Language codes
- ISO 639-3: cbg
- Glottolog: chim1309
- ELP: Chimila
- Linguasphere: 81-EEA-a
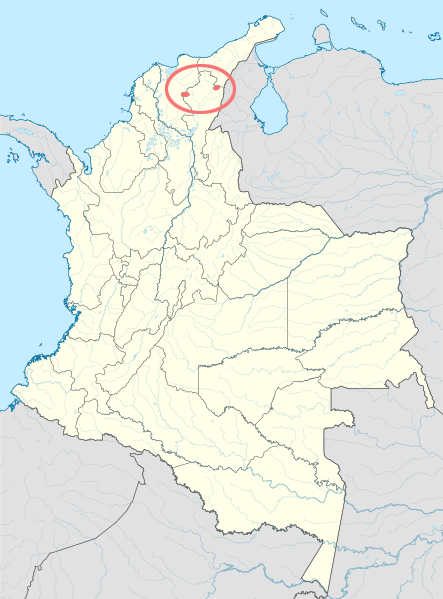

Chimila, known natively as Ette Taara, is a Chibchan language of Colombia, spoken by the Chimila people, who live between the lower Magdalena River, the Sierra Nevada de Santa Maria and the Cesar River. Chimila was historically grouped with the Malibu languages, but then it was classified as a Chibchan language.

Gerardo Reichel-Dolmatoff considered Chimila to be one of the Arawakan languages, and would thus be expected to be like Tairona, one of the Chibchan languages.

== Phonology ==
The following is a preliminary sketch based on Trillos Amaya's (1997) grammar.

The Chimila language has 5 oral vowels /i, u, e, o, a/. These basic segments can also be realized as short, long, aspirated and glottalized.

Vowels
	Front	Central	Back
Close	i iː iʰ iˀ		u uː uʰ uˀ
Mid	e eː eʰ eˀ		o oː oʰ oˀ
Open		a aː aʰ aˀ	

The consonant inventory of Chimila consists of 23 phonemes. Voiceless stops are essentially realized as in Spanish, without any additional feature. On the other hand, voiced stops are prenasalized. The same is true for affricates. In addition, there is also a plain voiced velar stop and a plain voiced palatal affricate. Velar consonants also exhibit a labialized counterpart. The trill /ɾ/ is slightly preglottalized.

Consonants
		Bilabial	Alveolar	Palatal	Velar	Labialized velar
Plosive/ Affricate	voiceless	p	t	tʃ	k	kʷ
Plosive/ Affricate	voiced			dʒ	g	gʷ
Plosive/ Affricate	prenasalized	ᵐb	ⁿd	ᶮdʒ	ᵑg	ᵑgʷ
Nasal		m	n	ɲ	ŋ	ŋʷ
Fricative			s		x	
Approximant			l, ɾ		w	

Plain voiced and prenasalized stops and affricates have been shown to contrast, e.g. kaː "breast", gaː "excrement" and ᵑgaː "wing, feather". The most frequent type of consonant cluster is formed by a stop and /ɾ/. In general, lenis consonants, except for prenasalized ones, /x/, /ɾ/ and /w/, are realized as fortis whenever they follow the stressed syllable.

=== Tone ===
According to Trillos Amaya (1997), Chimila also has two tones. In monosyllabic words ending in a long vowel, tone is contrastive, e.g. tóː "maraca" (rising tone), tòː "heart" (falling tone). In polysyllabic words, the distribution of tones is often predictable: if the syllable following the vowel that bears the tone starts with a geminated consonant or /r/, the tone is falling, however, if the following consonant is not geminated, then the tone is rising.

== Vocabulary ==
In early twentieth century, anthropologist Dolmatoff (1947) was able to collect an extensive sample of Chimila words. The following table shows some basic vocabulary items of the language:

gloss	Chimila
one	ti-tásu, nyéːˀmun
two	(ti-)múxuna
three	(ti-)máxana
four	mbrí nyéː
head	háːˀkra
eye	guáːˀkva
nose	náːˀ
ear	kútsaˀkra
tooth	dí
man	tsáːˀkve
woman	yúnˀkve
water	níː-taˀkve
fire	ngéː
earth	íˀti
fish	mínˀkrava
tree	ká, káx
sun	nínga
moon	máːma-su

A provisional writing system has been developed by the Summer Institute of Linguistics. Some of the words mentioned above are now spelled differently, as shown in the following table:

gloss	Chimila
two	tiimujnaʼ
three	tiimajnaʼ
four	briiʼ yeeʼe
head	jaakra-la
tooth	dij
sun	diǥǥa
moon	maamasuʼ

== Toponyms ==
"Cesar", the name of both the Cesar River and the Cesar Department, is an adaptation from the Chimila word Chet-tzar or Zazare ("calm water") into Spanish.

Guatapurí derives from the Chimila for "cold water", and provides the name of the Guatapurí River.
