= Pueblo Bello =

Coordinates: 10°25′N 73°35′W

- Municipality
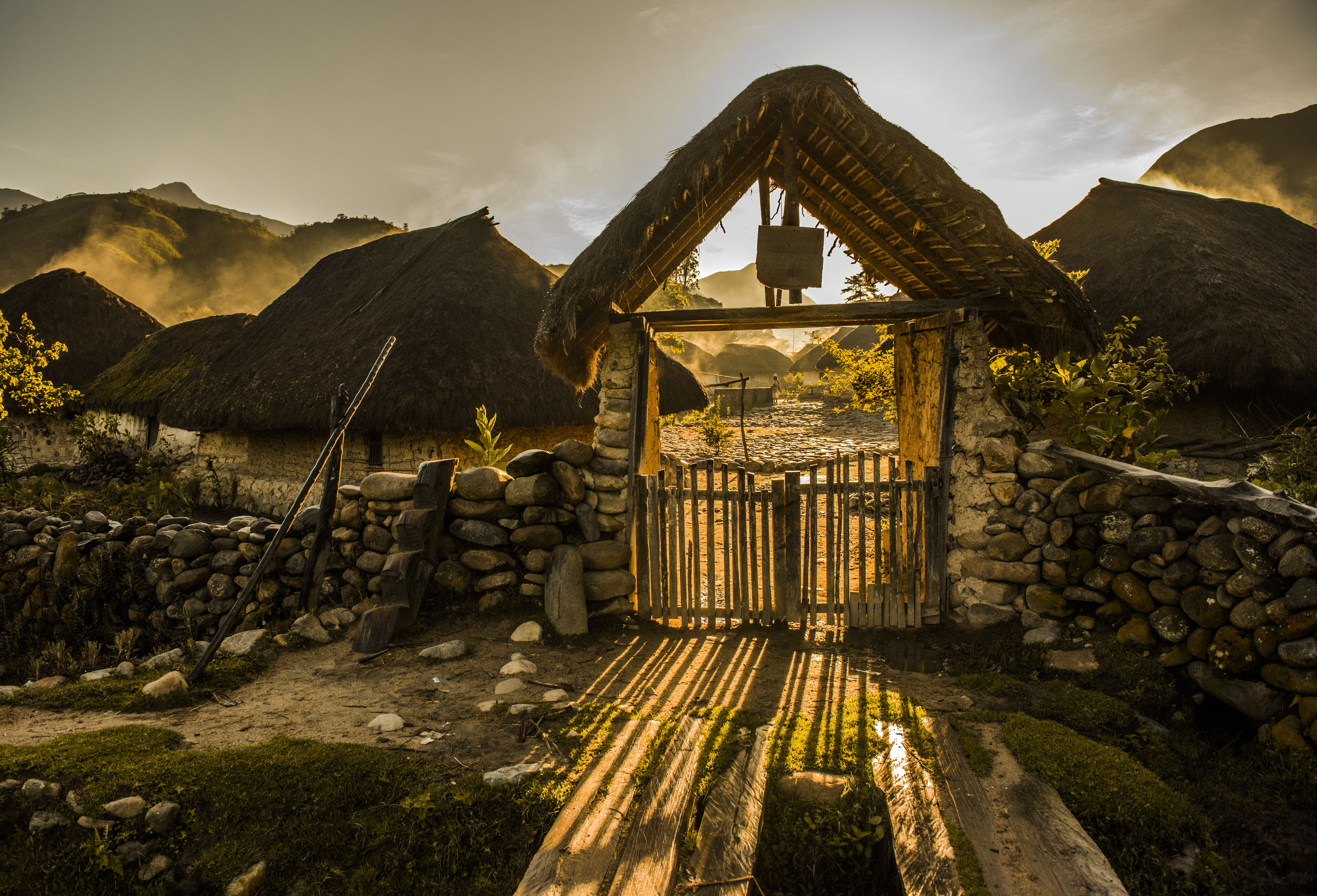
- Nabusímake, arhuaco's town

- Flag
- Motto: Work, Tenacity and Honesty (Spanish: Trabajo, teson y honradez)
- Location of the municipality and town of Pueblo Bello in the Department of Cesar.
- Country: Colombia
- Region: Caribbean
- Department: Cesar
- Foundation: 1590

Government
  - Mayor: Alfredo Bohorquez (Alas Equipo Colombia)

Population (Census 2018)
  - Total: 22,929
- Time zone: UTC-5
- Website: www.pueblobello-cesar.gov.co

Pueblo Bello (Pretty Village), is a village and municipality in the northern region of the Department of Cesar, Colombia. It is located in the mountains of the Sierra Nevada de Santa Marta and is home to Amerindians pertaining to the Arhuaco ethnicity, whom consider Pueblo Bello a sanctuary but by the name of Arumake in their language. Pueblo Bello is the main producer of coffee in the Caribbean Region of Colombia.

== Geography ==
Pueblo Bello is the only municipality that is completely within the Sierra Nevada de Santa Marta mountains. The municipality borders to the north with the Department of Magdalena; to the east and south with the municipality of Valledupar and to the southwest with the municipality of El Copey. The municipality of Pueblo Bello is also part a Forest Reserve, the Sierra Nevada de Santa Marta National Park and the indigenous reserve. The municipality is crossed by two rivers; the Ariguaní River and the Ariguanicito River.

=== Climate ===
Pueblo Bello presents an average temperature throughout the year between 16 °C and 22 °C predominantly characterized by mountain climate.

== History ==
The region was first inhabited by the Arhuaco and Chimila Maconganas. Upon the arrival of the Spanish, during the Spanish colonization of the Americas, the first European explorers to arrive were men under the orders of Lope de Orozco and had named it Valle de Taironaca (Valley of Taironaca).

The village was founded by Captain Antonio Florez in c. 1590 with the name Dulce Nombre de Jesus but due to constant attacks from the Chimilas the town was moved nearer to Valledupar. The old village was named; Pueblo Viejo (named changed to Pueblo Bello in the 20th Century) and the new town; Nueva Valencia.

Pueblo Bello was a corregimiento of Valledupar until 1997 when it was elevated to municipality by Ordinance 037 of December 10, 1997; later Decree 000239 of May 6, 1998 the Ordinance was recognized and enforced.

== Culture ==
Pueblo Bello celebrates the Festival del Café y la Mochila Arhuaca and the "Regional Olympics". On July 16 of each year the town celebrates the Roman Catholic tradition of the Virgin of El Carmen.
