= List of mayors of Chimichagua =

The following is a list of mayors of the city of Chimichagua, Colombia. (Spanish: Alcaldes de Chimichagua)

Term	Mayor	Notes
1995–1997	Manuel Muñoz	
1998–2000	Andres Palomino Martinez	
January 1, 2008 – Present	Rigoberto Perez	Member of the Colombian Conservative Party

== See also ==
- List of governors of Cesar Department
