= List of mayors of Aguachica =

The following is a list of mayors of the city of Aguachica, Colombia. (Spanish: Alcaldes de Aguachica)

Term	Mayor	Notes
1995 - 1997	Luis Fernando Rincon	
1998 - 2000	Israel Obregon Ropero	
2008 - 2010	Gustavo Adolfo Maldonado	Member of the Colombia Democrática political party
2023 - 2024	Víctor Roqueme Quiñonez	

== See also ==
- List of governors of Cesar Department
