= Hernando de Santana =

Spanish conquistador

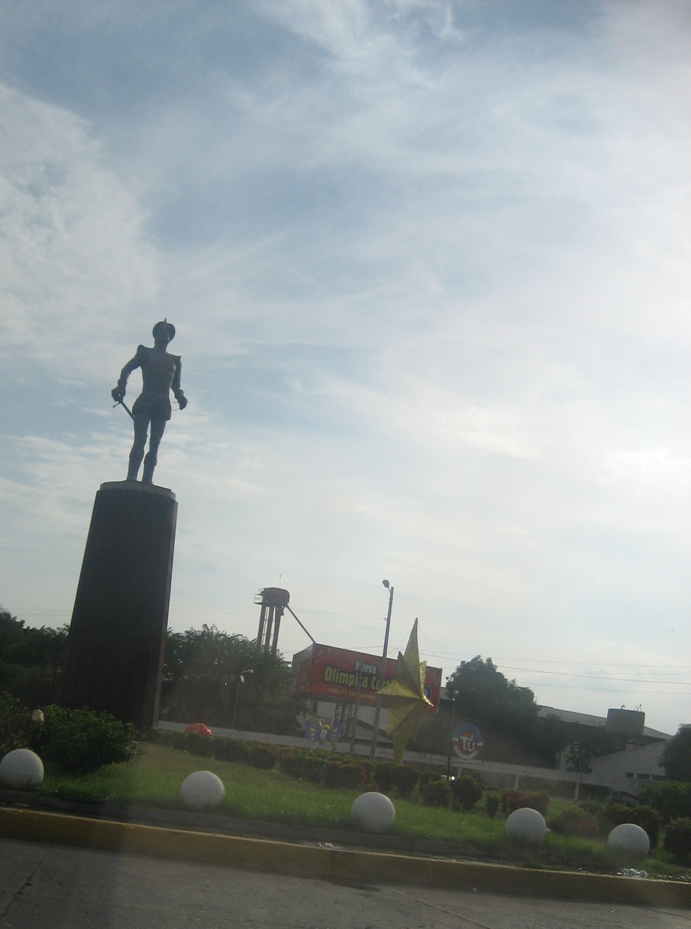
Statue honoring Hernando de Santana in Valledupar, Colombia

Hernando de Santana (born in the 1510s, Zafra, Badajoz Province, Spain - year of death unknown) was a Spanish conquistador, founder of the city of Valledupar on January 6, 1550, and conqueror in what is now northern Colombia.

== See also ==
- List of conquistadors in Colombia
- Spanish conquest of the Chibchan Nations
- Chimila people
