= Las Flores Airport (Colombia) =

- IATA: ELB; ICAO: SKBC

Summary
- Airport type: Public
- Serves: El Banco, Colombia
- Elevation AMSL: 111 ft / 34 m
- Coordinates: 9°02′45″N 73°58′30″W

Map
- Location of the airport in Colombia

Runways
Direction	Length		Surface
Direction	m	ft	Surface
10/28	1,215	3,986	Asphalt
- Sources: GCM

Las Flores Airport (IATA: ELB, ICAO: SKBC) is an airport serving the Magdalena River port of El Banco, in the Magdalena Department of Colombia. The airport is 5 kilometres (3.1 mi) north of the town.

== See also ==
- Transport in Colombia
- List of airports in Colombia
