= Curumaní =

Coordinates: 9°12′N 73°33′W

- Municipality and town
- Flag

- Location of the municipality and town of Curumaní in the Department of Cesar.
- Country: Colombia
- Region: Caribbean
- Department: Cesar

Government
  - Mayor: Alain Carcamo (Radical Change)

Population (Census 2018)
  - Total: 34,838
- Time zone: UTC-5
- Website: http://curumani-cesar.gov.co

Curumaní is a town and municipality in the Colombian Department of Cesar.
