= Tamalameque =

Coordinates: 8°50′N 73°35′W

- Town

- Flag

- Location of the municipality and town of Tamalameque in the Department of Cesar
- Country: Colombia
- Region: Caribbean
- Department: Cesar
- Founded: 29 September 1544
- Founder: Lorenzo Martín

Government
  - Mayor: José Ricardo Aguilar (2016-2019)

Area
  - Town: 511.31 km^{2} (197.42 sq mi)
  - Water: 97.1 km^{2} (37.5 sq mi)
  - Urban: 30.66 km^{2} (11.84 sq mi)
- Highest elevation: 150 m (490 ft)
- Lowest elevation: 50 m (160 ft)

Population (2015)
  - Town: 13,862
  - Density: 27.111/km^{2} (70.217/sq mi)
  - Urban: 5,585
- Time zone: UTC-5 (Colombia Standard Time)
- Website: Official website

Tamalameque is a town and municipality in the Colombian Department of Cesar. It was originally the site of a Chimila settlement, Thamara. Tamalameque is located on the right bank of the Magdalena River and borders Chimichagua and Pailitas in the north, Pelaya in the east, La Gloria in the south and in the west the departments of Bolívar (El Peñón) and Magdalena (El Banco).

== History ==
Tamalameque was first visited by the Bavarian conquistador Ambrosius Ehinger in 1531. The first conquest expedition into the interior of Colombia, led by Gonzalo Jiménez de Quesada passed through Tamalameque in 1536. The local Chimila resisted heavily against the conquistadors.

Modern Tamalameque was founded on 29 September 1544 by Lorenzo Martín.

== Economy ==
Tamalameque, situated in an area dotted with wetlands and swamps at the Magdalena River, has an economy based on fishing, agriculture and livestock farming. Main agricultural products cultivated are rice and sorghum, and further from the river bananas and yuca.
