= Ariguaní River =

River in Colombia

Coordinates: 10°12′24″N 74°02′17″W

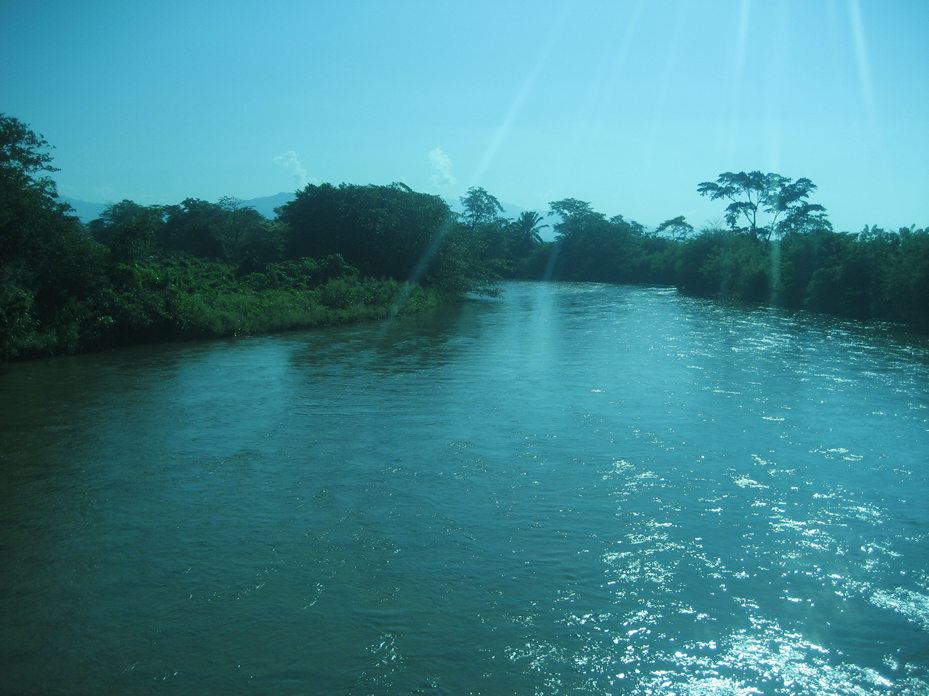
The Ariguaní River border between the Cesar Department (right) and the Magdalena Department (left). The Sierra Nevada de Santa Marta barely seen in the background.

Ariguaní River (Spanish pronunciation: [aɾiɣwaˈni]) is a river in northern Colombia's Caribbean Region born in the Sierra Nevada de Santa Marta mountain range in the area of the municipality of Pueblo Bello. The Ariguaní is an affluent of the Cesar River and flows from north to south into it near the town of El Paso. The Ariguaní River is also a natural and political border between the Cesar and Magdalena Departments.

== Basin ==
- Mallorquin stream
- El Jobo
- Las Mulas
- Garrapaso
- Espíritu Santo
- Las Pavas Creek
