= Río de Oro, Cesar =

Coordinates: 8°00′N 73°30′W

Río de Oro
- Town
- Flag

- Location of the municipality and town of Río de Oro in the Department of Cesar.
- Country: Colombia
- Region: Caribbean
- Department: Cesar

Government
  - Mayor: Arnoldo Osorio (Convergencia Ciudadana)

Area
  - Total: 616 km^{2} (238 sq mi)

Population (Census 2018)
  - Total: 14,408
  - Density: 23.4/km^{2} (60.6/sq mi)
- Time zone: UTC-5
- Website: www.riodeoro-cesar.gov.co

Río de Oro (English: River of Gold) is a town and municipality in the Colombian Department of Cesar.
