= Chimichagua =

Coordinates: 9°15′N 73°49′W

- City
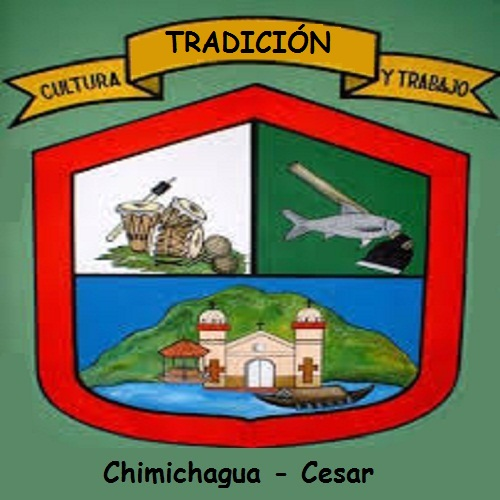
- Flag Coat of arms
- Nickname: (in Spanish) "El Viejo Puerto" "The Old Port"
- Motto: "Peace, Union and Work" (in Spanish) Paz, Union y Trabajo
- Location of the municipality and town of Chimichagua in the Department of Cesar.
- Country: Colombia
- Region: Caribbean
- Department: Cesar
- Foundation: 1748

Government
  - Mayor: Rigoberto Perez (Colombian Conservative Party)

Area
  - Total: 1,568 km^{2} (605 sq mi)

Population (Census 2018)
  - Total: 30,289
- Time zone: UTC-5
- Website: chimichagua-cesar.gov.co/

Chimichagua (Spanish pronunciation: [tʃimiˈtʃaɣwa]) is a city and municipality in the central region of the Department of Cesar, Colombia. Approximately one third of the municipality of Chimichagua is water. The municipality seat lies by the Cienaga de Zapatosa marshes.

== Etymology ==
Chimichagua was the name of the Chimila cacique that inhabited the area at the time of the Spanish conquest. Chimichagua or Chiminigagua is the name of the supreme being of the Muisca. Muisca and Chimila pertain to the same language family; the Chibcha language.

== History ==
=== Pre-Columbian ===
The territory of the municipality of Chimichagua was inhabited by the indigenous group known as the Chimila who at the time of the Spanish arrival were established in most of the Cesar River basin and its valley between the Sierra Nevada de Santa Marta and the Serranía del Perijá mountain ranges and bordering the Magdalena River.

=== Spanish conquest and colonization ===
Chimichagua was founded by Jose Fernando de Mier y Guerra on December 8, 1748 accompanied by Sebastian de Eslava who was in representation of the Viceroy. The village was first named Nuestra Señora de la Purísima Concepción de Chimichagua. The population of this village migrated to other nearby villages such as Tamalameque, Santa Cruz de Mompox, Valencia de Jesús and Valledupar due to accessibility problems.

=== Republicanism ===
Chimichagua became a municipality by Ordinance 54 of 1892. In 1967 with the creation of the Department of Cesar Chimichagua became one of its municipalities.

== Politics ==
=== Administrative divisions ===
==== Corregimientos ====
Chimichagua has 9 corregimientos:

- Candelaria
- El Guamo
- Las Vegas
- Mindinguilla
- Saloa
- Sempegua
- Soledad
- La Mata
- El Jobo
