= González, Cesar =

Coordinates: 8°24′N 73°20′W

González
- town
- Flag Coat of arms

- Location of the municipality and town of González in the Department of Cesar.
- Country: Colombia
- Region: Caribbean
- Department: Cesar

Government
  - Mayor: Carlos Roberto Osorio (Colombian Conservative Party)

Population (2005)
  - Total: 8,859
- Time zone: UTC-5
- Website: www.gonzalez-cesar.gov.co

González (Spanish pronunciation: [ɡonˈsales]) is a town and municipality in the Colombian Department of Cesar.
