= Gamarra, Cesar =

Coordinates: 8°20′N 73°40′W

Gamarra
- Town
- Flag

- Location of the municipality and town of Gamarra in the Department of Cesar.
- Country: Colombia
- Region: Caribbean
- Department: Cesar

Government
  - Mayor: Luís Alfredo Pino Arevalo (Alas Equipo Colombia)

Area
  - Total: 320 km^{2} (120 sq mi)

Population (Census 2018)
  - Total: 12,444
  - Density: 39/km^{2} (100/sq mi)
- Time zone: UTC-5
- Website: www.gamarra.gov.co

Gamarra is a town and municipality in the Colombian Department of Cesar.
