= Guatapurí River =

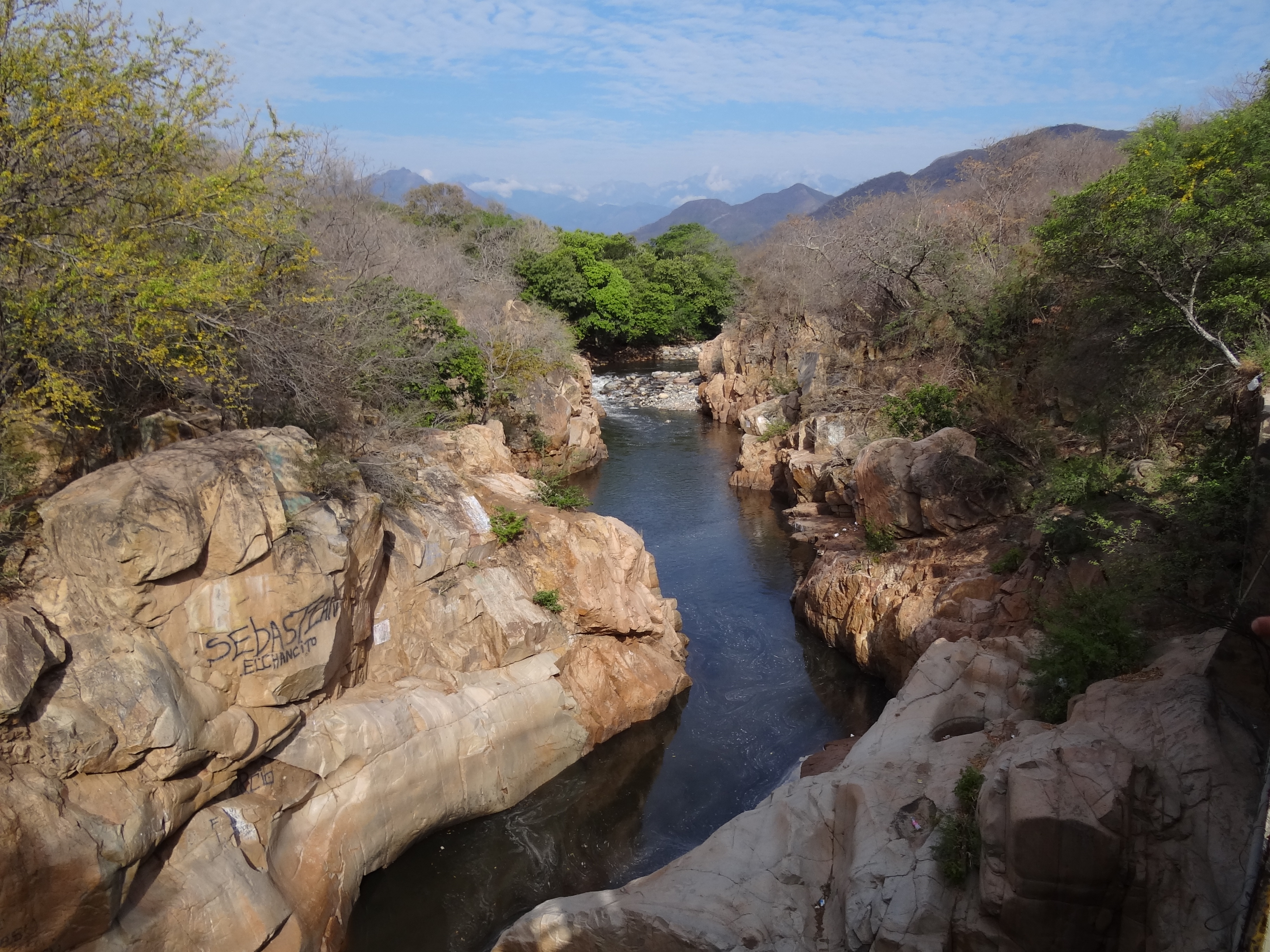
- Guatapurí River in the outskirts of Valledupar
- Etymology: Chimila: "cold water"
- Native name: Río Guatapurí (Spanish)

Location
- Country: Colombia

Physical characteristics
- Source: Curiba Lake
  - elevation: 4,400 m (14,400 ft)
- Mouth: Cesar River
- Length: 80 km (50 mi)

The Guatapurí River, or Rio Guatapurí in Spanish, is a river that flows from the eastern side of the Sierra Nevada de Santa Marta into the Cesar River in northern Colombia by the city of Valledupar. In the indigenous Chimila language, Guatapurí means "cold water".

Its main source is the Curiba Lake which is 4,400 metres (14,400 ft) above sea level. The Guatapurí is approximately 80 kilometres (50 mi) long. Among its major affluents are waters from the Curiba Lake, Donachui river, Capitanejo river, and Los Mangos river.
