= Chimila people =

Indigenous people in the Andes of north-eastern Colombia

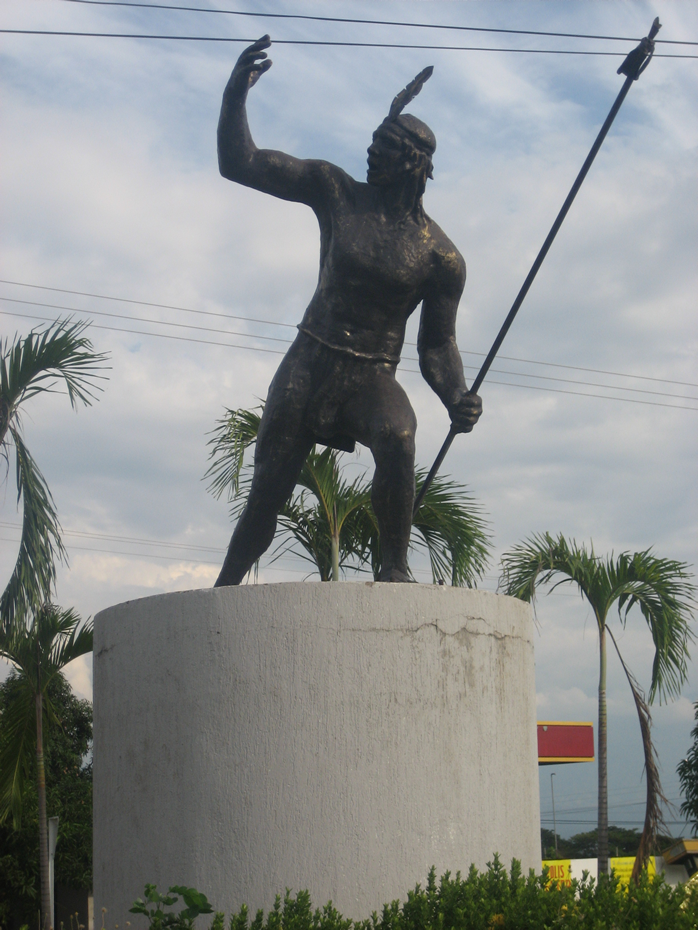
Statue in Valledupar honoring the Cacique Upar.

The Chimilas or Ette Ennaka are an Indigenous people in the Andes of north-eastern Colombia. Their Chimila language is part of the Chibcha language family, of which there were estimated to be around 1000 speakers in 1998. At the time of the Spanish Conquest the Ariguaní River valley was the strategic centre of their territory. On the Serranía del Perijá mountains the Yukpas were also part of the Chimila confederation of tribes.

== Pre-Columbian era ==
At the time of the Spanish colonization of the Americas the Chimilas were established in most of the Cesar River basin and its valley (including Valledupar in the Cesar Department) between the Sierra Nevada de Santa Marta and the Serranía del Perijá mountain ranges and bordering the Magdalena River. A Chimila cacique at the time of the Conquest lent his name to the city of Chimichagua, Colombia, while another, Upar, lent his name to Valledupar, via the Spanish ("valley of Upar"). The "Cesar" name of the Cesar River and Cesar Department is an adaptation from the Chimila indigenous word Chet-tzar or Zazare ("calm water") into Spanish, in reference to the Cesar River.

There were two major cities in the region; one was called Thamara (present-day Tamalameque) and the other was Upari, named after their powerful chief, the cacique Upar. The Spanish scribes described Thamara as a very large city with more than a thousand huts. The Chimila society was structured in a pyramidal structure with a working class divided into fishers, hunters, artisans, miners, goldsmiths and merchants. The Chimilas used Arhuacos as their slaves. The Chimilas believed in an immortal figure called Masirguta and were monotheist believing in the god Narayajana (also referred to as Yao). Chimilas were practiced musical rites with drums of many sizes, flutes with a tip made out of wax varying in between two and five holes, imitated the singing of the rufous-vented chachalaca birds with an instrument called guacharaca and maracas.

The Chimilas cultivated maize in a technical manner and to a lesser extent other local species of vegetables and fruits for consumption and certain trees near their huts to produces shadows and freshen their area. Chimilas also harvested Gynerium sagittatum, a cane used to produce bows and arrows.

== Conquest ==
Around 1720 the Chimilas began a guerrilla war against the Spanish Empire. Violence continued well into the twentieth century. In 1990 a reservation called Issa Oristuna was created.

== See also ==
- Tairona
- Vallenato Legend Festival
