= Pelaya =

Coordinates: 8°41′N 73°40′W

- Town
- Flag

- Location of the municipality and town of Pelaya in the Department of Cesar.
- Country: Colombia
- Region: Caribbean
- Department: Cesar

Government
  - Mayor: Harold Agudelo Ospino (Colombian Liberal Party)

Area
  - Total: 3,713 km^{2} (1,434 sq mi)

Population (Census 2018)
  - Total: 18,497
  - Density: 4.982/km^{2} (12.90/sq mi)
- Time zone: UTC-5
- Website: www.pelaya-cesar.gov.co

Pelaya is a town and municipality in the Colombian Department of Cesar.
