= Cesar Department =

Department of Colombia

Cesar Department Departamento del Cesar
- Department
- Department of the Cesar
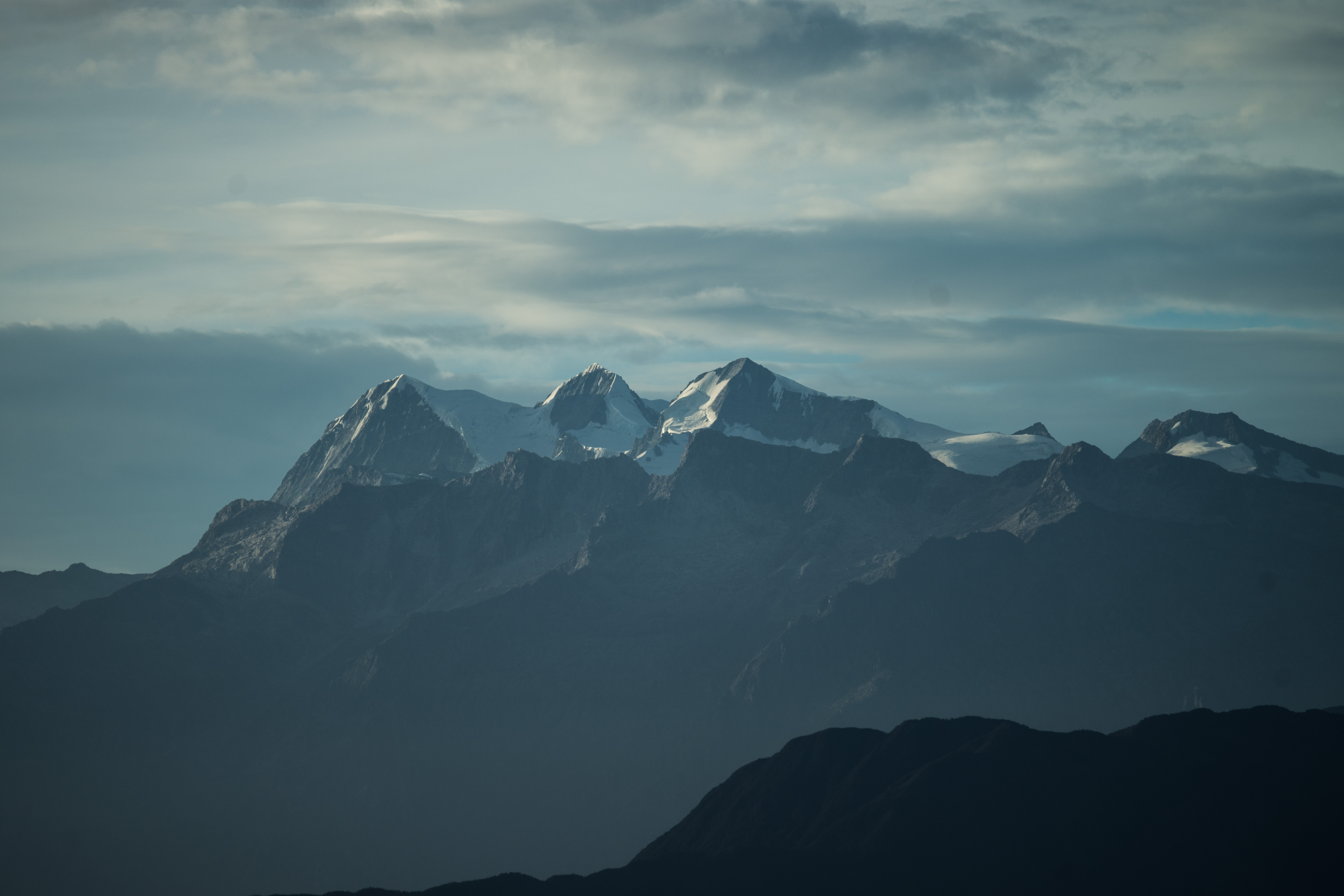
- View of the Sierra Nevada

- Flag Coat of arms
- Anthem: Himno del Cesar
- Cesar shown in green

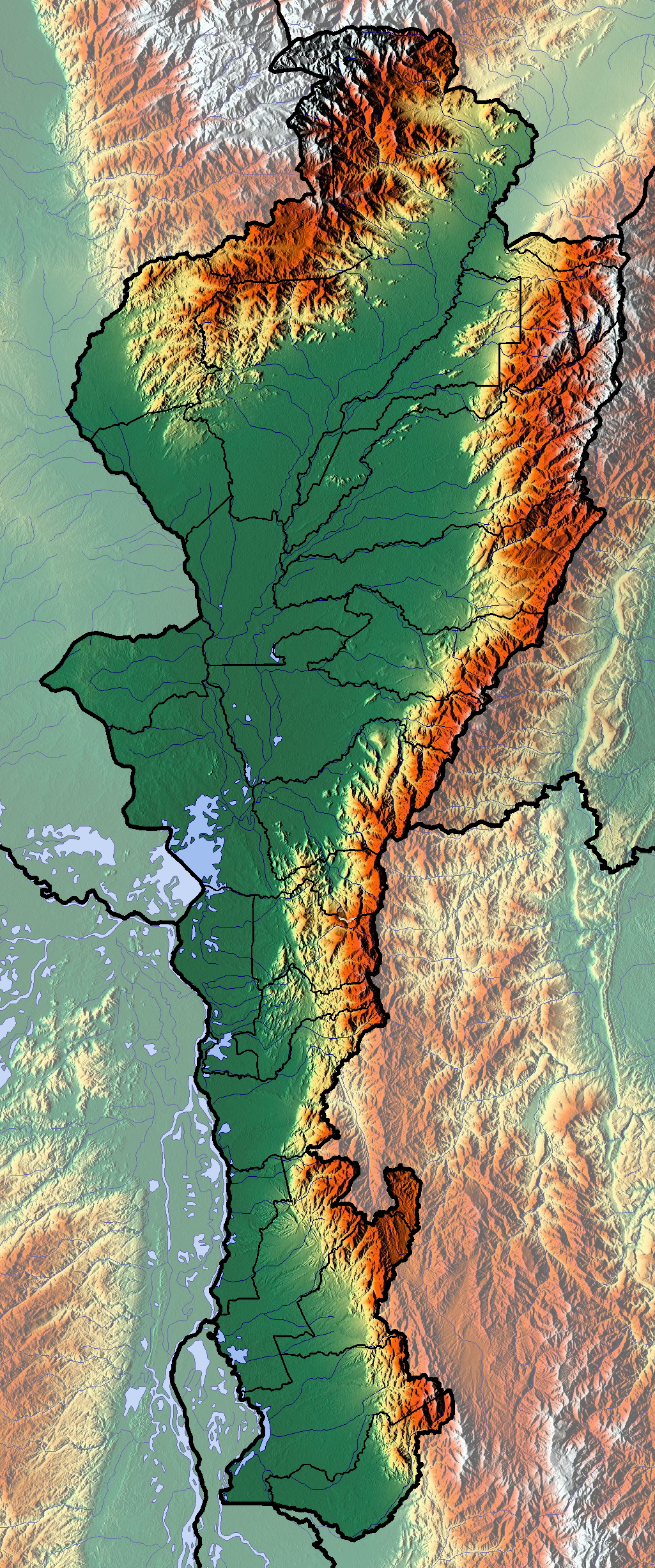
- Topography of the department
- Coordinates: 10°29′N 73°15′W
- Country: Colombia
- Region: Caribbean Region
- Established: December 1967
- Capital: Valledupar

Government
  - Governor: Francis Ferdinand Ovalle Angarita (2016-2019)

Area
  - Total: 22,905 km^{2} (8,844 sq mi)
  - Rank: 22nd

Population (2018)
  - Total: 1,200,574
  - Rank: 16th
  - Density: 52.415/km^{2} (135.76/sq mi)

GDP
  - Total: COP 37,524 billion (US$ 8.8 billion)
- Time zone: UTC-05
- ISO 3166 code: CO-CES
- HDI: 0.751 high · 21st of 33
- Website: www.gobcesar.gov.co

Cesar Department (Spanish: Departamento del Cesar), or simply Cesar, (Spanish pronunciation: [seˈsaɾ]) is a department of Colombia located in the north of the country in the Caribbean region, bordering to the north with the Department of La Guajira, to the west with the Department of Magdalena and Department of Bolivar, to the south with Department of Santander, to the east with the Department of North Santander, and further to the east with the country of Venezuela (Zulia State). The department capital city is Valledupar.

The region was first inhabited by indigenous peoples known as Euparis in the Valley of Upar and Guatapuris in the Valley of the Cesar river, among these were the Orejones pertaining to the Toupeh, Acanayutos pertaining to the Motilon and Alcoholades pertaining to the Chimila. The first European to explore the area was Spanish Captain Peter Vadillo, but German Ambrose Alfinger savagely conquered the region in 1532.

From 1996 to 2006 paramilitary groups committed gross human rights violations affecting tens of thousands of victims in the Cesar mining region.

== Etymology ==
The "Cesar" name is an adaptation from the Chimila indigenous word Chet-tzar or Zazare ("calm water") into Spanish, in reference to the Cesar River. The valley that its basin covers is also named after the river and extends through most of the department. The department of Cesar was created in 1967 by decree and the name officially adopted.

== Geography ==
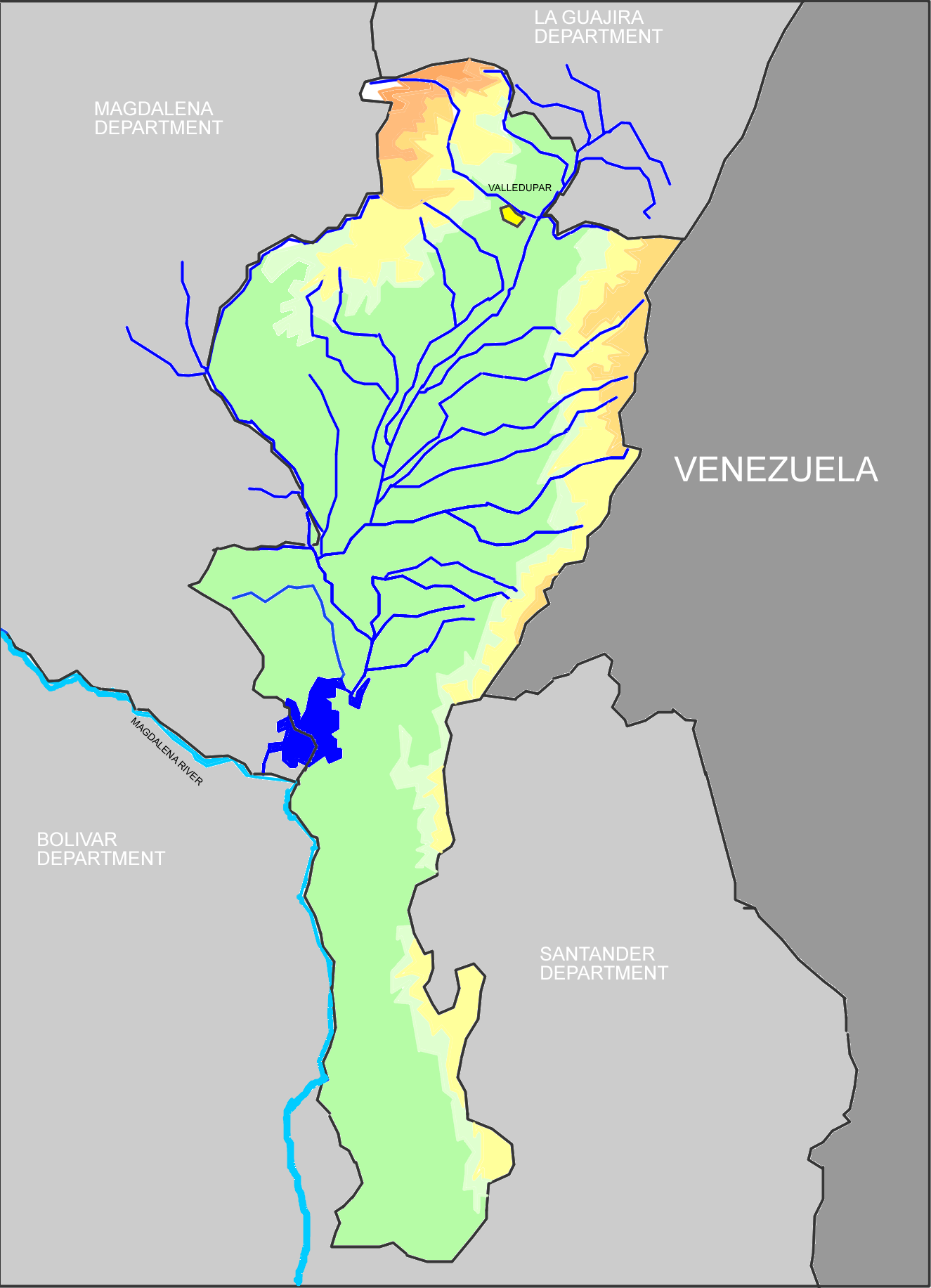
The Cesar River basin in the department of Cesar.

The department of Cesar is located in northern Colombia bordering to the north with the department of La Guajira, to the east with the Bolivarian Republic of Venezuela, to the west with the department of Magdalena, to the southwest with the Department of Bolivar and to the south with the departments of North Santander and Santander covering a total area of 22,905 km^{2}.

The majority of the department is flat in 57% of the total area and 43% mountainous mainly in the Serranía del Perijá and the Sierra Nevada de Santa Marta mountain ranges.

=== Ecoregions ===
The Department of Cesar contains five Ecoregions; the Serranía del Perijá mountain range, the valley of the Cesar River, the Sierra Nevada de Santa Marta mountain range, the valley of the Magdalena River and the Cienaga de Zapatosa marshes complex.

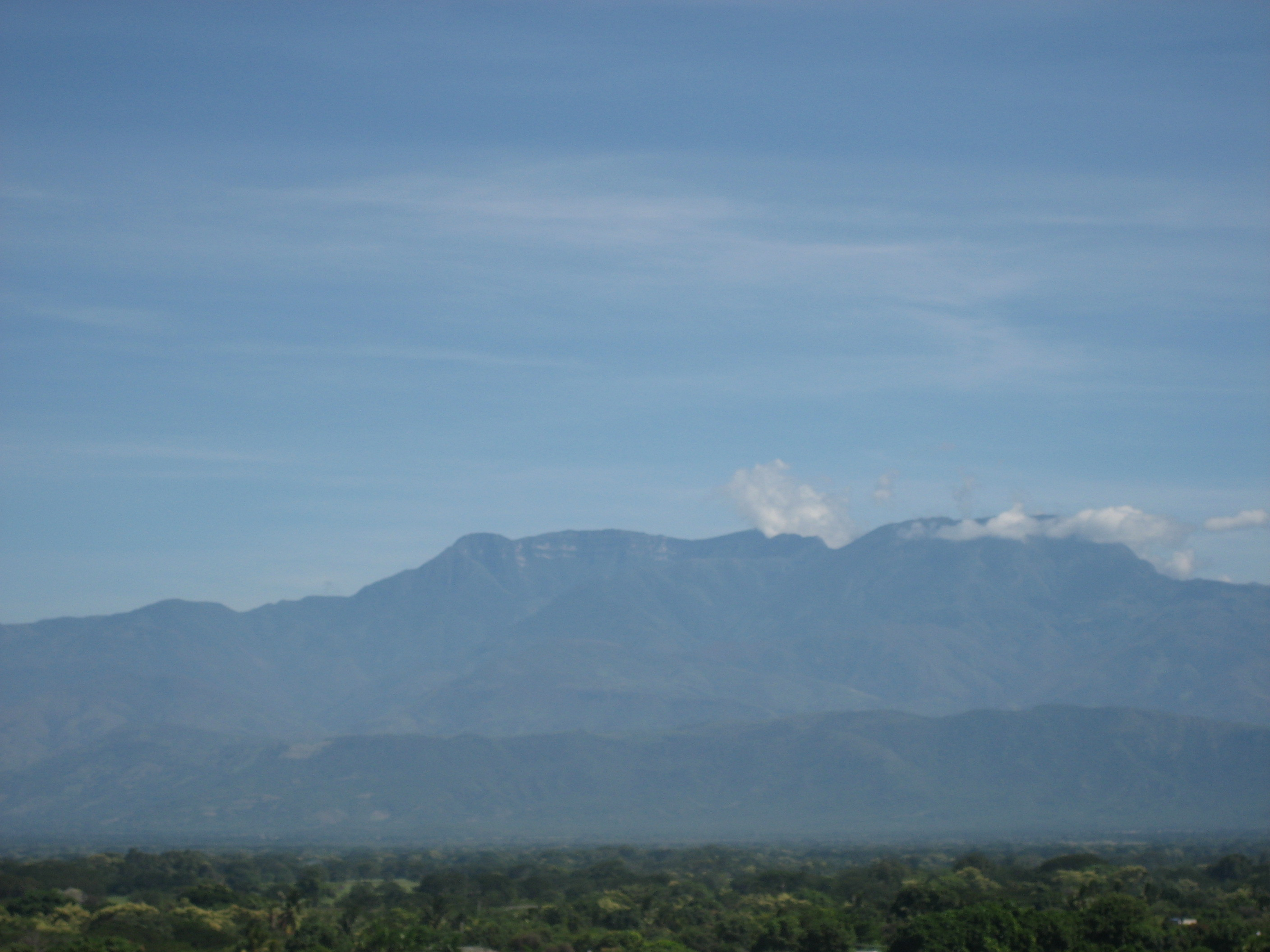
Cerro Pintao and the Serranía del Perijá.

==== Serranía del Perijá mountain range ====
The Serranía del Perijá mountain range covers most of the eastern side of the Department of Cesar between its border with Venezuela and the Department of North Santander, approximately 300 km in length penetrating into the Department of La Guajira to the north and covering 27% of the total area of Cesar. The Serranía del Perijá covers, partially or totally the area of 17 municipalities in the Department of Cesar; Aguachica, Codazzi, Becerril, Chimichagua, Chiriguana, Curumani, Gonzalez, La Gloria, La Jagua de Ibirico, Los Robles La Paz, Manaure, Pailitas, Pelaya, Rio de Oro, San Alberto, San Diego and San Martin. There are also the indigenous reserves pertaining to the Yukpas people; Iroka, Socorpa and Menkue-Misaya-La Pista; and to the Wiwas people; Caño Padilla, El Rosario-Bella Vista-Yucatán and Campoalegre.

Approximately 70% of the mountain range preserves unique flora and fauna and some 20 rivers are born in the mountain range among other minor streams, flowing into the Department of Cesar and feeding the Magdalena and Cesar river basins and the Cienaga de Zapatosa marshes. The Colombian government declared it a National Forest Reserve.

==== Sierra Nevada de Santa Marta mountain range ====
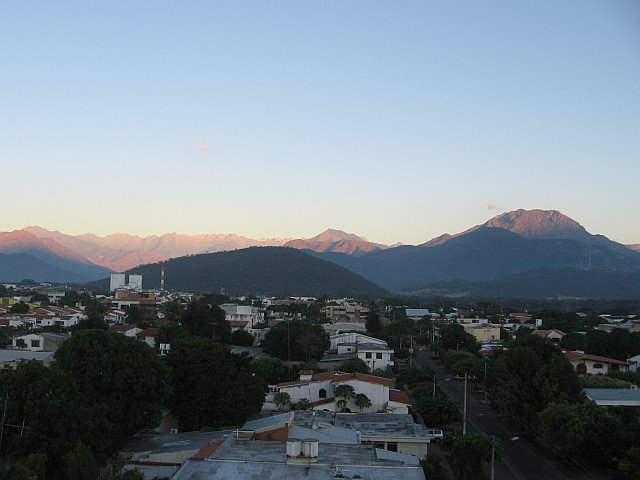
The Sierra Nevada de Santa Marta as seen from Valledupar.

The Sierra Nevada de Santa Marta mountain range is an isolated mountain range located in the northwestern region of the Department of Cesar. The mountain range is shared with by Department of La Guajira, which covers the northern area, the Department of Magdalena to the western side and the Department of Cesar which covers the southern face, covering a total area of 16,615 km^{2} (1'661,500 ha) of which 380,000 ha pertain to the Department of Cesar. The Cesar River and the western side of its basin is born on the Sierra Nevada de Santa Marta, including the Guatapuri, Badillo, Ariguani, Cesarito, Los Clavos, Garupal and Rio Seco rivers. The mountains are within the boundaries of the municipalities of Pueblo Bello, Valledupar, El Copey and Bosconia.

The Sierra Nevada de Santa Marta was declared by UNESCO as a Biosphere Reserve on October 29, 1993.

==== Cienaga de Zapatosa marshes ====
Ciénaga de Zapatosa

=== Climate ===
Climate in the Department of Cesar presents variations in climate depending on altitude, as well as rainfall precipitations. Mountain climate in the Sierra Nevada de Santa Marta and the Serranía del Perijá become cooler with higher altitude, reaching freezing low temperatures on the snowy peaks. Lowlands average a temperature throughout the year of 28 °C or 82.4 °F. These lower lands present a hot and drier climate, with annual precipitation less than 1,300 millimetres or 51 inches a year. The mountainous regions are characterized by low temperatures with snow on high altitude peaks and precipitation reaching more than 2,000 millimetres or 79 inches a year.

Climate data for Valledupar
Month	Jan	Feb	Mar	Apr	May	Jun	Jul	Aug	Sep	Oct	Nov	Dec	Year
Mean daily maximum °C (°F)	34.7 (94.5)	35.6 (96.1)	35.9 (96.6)	35.6 (96.1)	34.0 (93.2)	34.2 (93.6)	35.4 (95.7)	35.1 (95.2)	33.8 (92.8)	32.6 (90.7)	33.2 (91.8)	33.6 (92.5)	35.1 (93.6)
Mean daily minimum °C (°F)	22.4 (72.3)	23.1 (73.6)	23.6 (74.5)	24.1 (75.4)	24.1 (75.4)	24.0 (75.2)	24.2 (75.6)	24.0 (75.2)	23.5 (74.3)	23.6 (74.5)	23.1 (73.6)	22.8 (73.0)	23.6 (74.3)
Average rainfall mm (inches)	12 (0.5)	10 (0.4)	26 (1.0)	71 (2.8)	154 (6.1)	82 (3.2)	63 (2.5)	116 (4.6)	122 (4.8)	199 (7.8)	89 (3.5)	28 (1.1)	972 (38.3)
Source: Weatherbase

== History ==
Historical population
Year	Pop.	±%
1973	340,657	—
1985	699,428	+105.3%
1993	827,219	+18.3%
2005	903,279	+9.2%
2018	1,200,574	+32.9%

=== Pre-Columbian ===
The region was first inhabited by indigenous peoples known as Euparíes in the Valley of Upar and Guatapuríes in the Valley of the Cesar River, among these were the Orejones pertaining to the Tupe, Acanayutos pertaining to the Motilon and Alcoholados pertaining to the Chimila.

Spanish chronicles describe the tribes as being part of a federation of tribes led by a single chief (Cacique), with the village of Eupari as the largest and central to the other villages. These tribes are believed to be related to the Mesoamerican culture, the Caribs and Arawaks, directly associated to the Muisca culture in the Colombian eastern branch of the Andes.

Archeological findings has shown that the indigenous in the area worked with stones and wood, including a boomerang shaped weapon found in a cemetery at Los Robles La Paz.

=== Spanish conquest and colonization ===
The first European to explore the area was Spanish Captain Pedro de Vadillo, but German Ambrosio Alfínger savagely conquered the region in 1531. In 1550 the village of Valle de Upar was founded by Hernando de Santana and Juan de Castellanos.

=== Republican era ===
In 1813, María de la Concepción Loperena proclaimed the independence of Valledupar and donated 300 horses to Simón Bolívar. In 1829 Valledupar became a Cantón of the Province of Santa Marta. By Law 15 of 1850, Valledupar was segregated from Santa Marta becoming the province of Valledupar. In 1857 became a province of the State of Magdalena and by Law of December 29, 1864, became the Department of Valledupar pertaining to State of Magdalena. On December 21, 1967, the Department of Cesar was created officially.

=== Modern era ===
From 1996 to 2006 paramilitary groups committed gross human rights violations affecting tens of thousands of victims in the Cesar mining region. Prodeco, a subsidiary of Glencore, and the US Drummond Company collaborated with the paramilitaries in order to continue coal mining.

== Politics ==
=== Administrative divisions ===
==== Municipalities ====
The Department of Cesar is formed by 25 municipalities, some 171 corregimientos, 990 veredas and 10 indigenous reserves.

For administrative reasons the Department of Cesar is subdivided into 4 strategic regions:

- the Northern Subregion covering the municipalities of Valledupar, Codazzi, Pueblo Bello, La Paz, Manaure and San Diego;
- the Northwestern Subregion covering the municipalities of Bosconia, El Copey, El Paso and Astrea;
- the Central Subregion covering the municipalities of Curumani, Becerril, Chiriguana, La Jagua de Ibirico, Chimichagua, Tamalameque and Pailitas; and
- the Southern Subregion covering the municipalities of Aguachica, Gamarra, Gonzalez, La Gloria, Pelaya, Rio de Oro, San Alberto and San Martin.

Municipalities	Map
1. Aguachica; 2. Astrea; 3. Becerril; 4. Bosconia; 5. Chimichagua; 6. Chiriguaná; 7. Codazzi; 8. Curumaní; 9. El Copey; 10. El Paso; 11. Gamarra; 12. González; 13. La Gloria; 14. La Jagua de Ibirico; 15. Manaure; 16. Pailitas; 17. Pelaya; 18. Pueblo Bello; 19. Rio de Oro; 20. Los Robles La Paz; 21. San Alberto; 22. San Diego; 23. San Martín; 24. Tamalameque; 25. Valledupar	Municipalities in the Cesar Department

== Economy ==
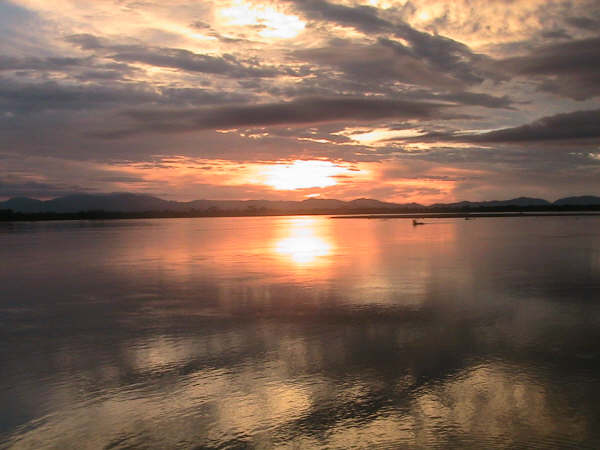
Ciénaga de la Zapatosa marsh by La Gloria, southern Cesar Department

The economy of the César Department is sustained by the agricultural sector, secondly by a services industry following with commercial industry and mining. Cattle raising is exploited extensively (using large farms), and for this reason large portions of forests have been chopped off to create corrals. In agriculture, plantations of cotton, rice, sugar cane, oil palm, cassava and plantain. Services are centered on commerce and the industry is represented by oil products, fats and milk derived products. As one of the biggest water resources areas of Colombia, if not America, part of the Magdalena River crosses the department and helps create the Cienaga de Zapatosa (Zapatosa Marsh) along with the Cesar river. It has a great potential to develop a fishing industry also.

The area between La Loma and La Jagua de Ibirico is the major coal-producing region of Colombia.

== Flag ==
The flag of the department consists of a white horizontal band between two green ones. The meaning ascribed to the green is that it symbolizes the fertile vegetation of the department, and to the white, that it stands for the hope of peace.
