= Pailitas =

Coordinates: 8°58′N 73°38′W

- Town
- Flag

- Location of the municipality and town of Pailitas in the Department of Cesar.
- Country: Colombia
- Region: Caribbean
- Department: Cesar

Government
  - Mayor: Luis Carlos Galván (Alas Equipo Colombia)

Area
  - Total: 521 km^{2} (201 sq mi)

Population (Census 2018)
  - Total: 16,800
  - Density: 32.2/km^{2} (83.5/sq mi)
- Time zone: UTC-5
- Website: www.pailitas.gov.co

Pailitas is a town and municipality in the Colombian Department of Cesar.

== Climate ==
Climate data for Pailitas (Col Agro Pailitas), elevation 50 m (160 ft), (1981–2010)
Month	Jan	Feb	Mar	Apr	May	Jun	Jul	Aug	Sep	Oct	Nov	Dec	Year
Mean daily maximum °C (°F)	33.5 (92.3)	34.5 (94.1)	34.3 (93.7)	33.4 (92.1)	32.6 (90.7)	32.6 (90.7)	33.4 (92.1)	32.9 (91.2)	32.5 (90.5)	31.9 (89.4)	31.9 (89.4)	32.5 (90.5)	33.0 (91.4)
Daily mean °C (°F)	27.7 (81.9)	28.8 (83.8)	28.9 (84.0)	28.2 (82.8)	27.7 (81.9)	27.8 (82.0)	28.2 (82.8)	27.9 (82.2)	27.3 (81.1)	26.9 (80.4)	26.9 (80.4)	27.1 (80.8)	27.9 (82.2)
Mean daily minimum °C (°F)	21.1 (70.0)	21.7 (71.1)	22.5 (72.5)	23.0 (73.4)	23.1 (73.6)	22.9 (73.2)	23.0 (73.4)	22.7 (72.9)	22.7 (72.9)	22.4 (72.3)	22.4 (72.3)	21.9 (71.4)	22.5 (72.5)
Average precipitation mm (inches)	34.0 (1.34)	28.3 (1.11)	107.8 (4.24)	209.0 (8.23)	303.9 (11.96)	188.0 (7.40)	135.6 (5.34)	180.0 (7.09)	274.0 (10.79)	284.8 (11.21)	271.4 (10.69)	74.8 (2.94)	2,091.7 (82.35)
Average precipitation days	2	3	7	12	16	15	14	17	18	19	15	6	144
Average relative humidity (%)	76	72	74	77	81	81	81	81	83	85	85	81	80
Mean monthly sunshine hours	251.1	214.5	201.5	159.0	167.4	177.0	207.7	201.5	162.0	164.3	165.0	217.0	2,288
Mean daily sunshine hours	8.1	7.6	6.5	5.3	5.4	5.9	6.7	6.5	5.4	5.3	5.5	7.0	6.3
Source: Instituto de Hidrologia Meteorologia y Estudios Ambientales
