= Cesar River =

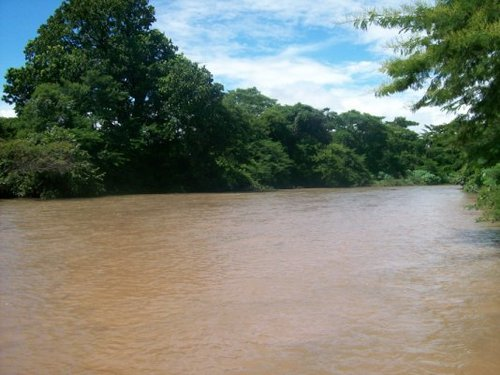

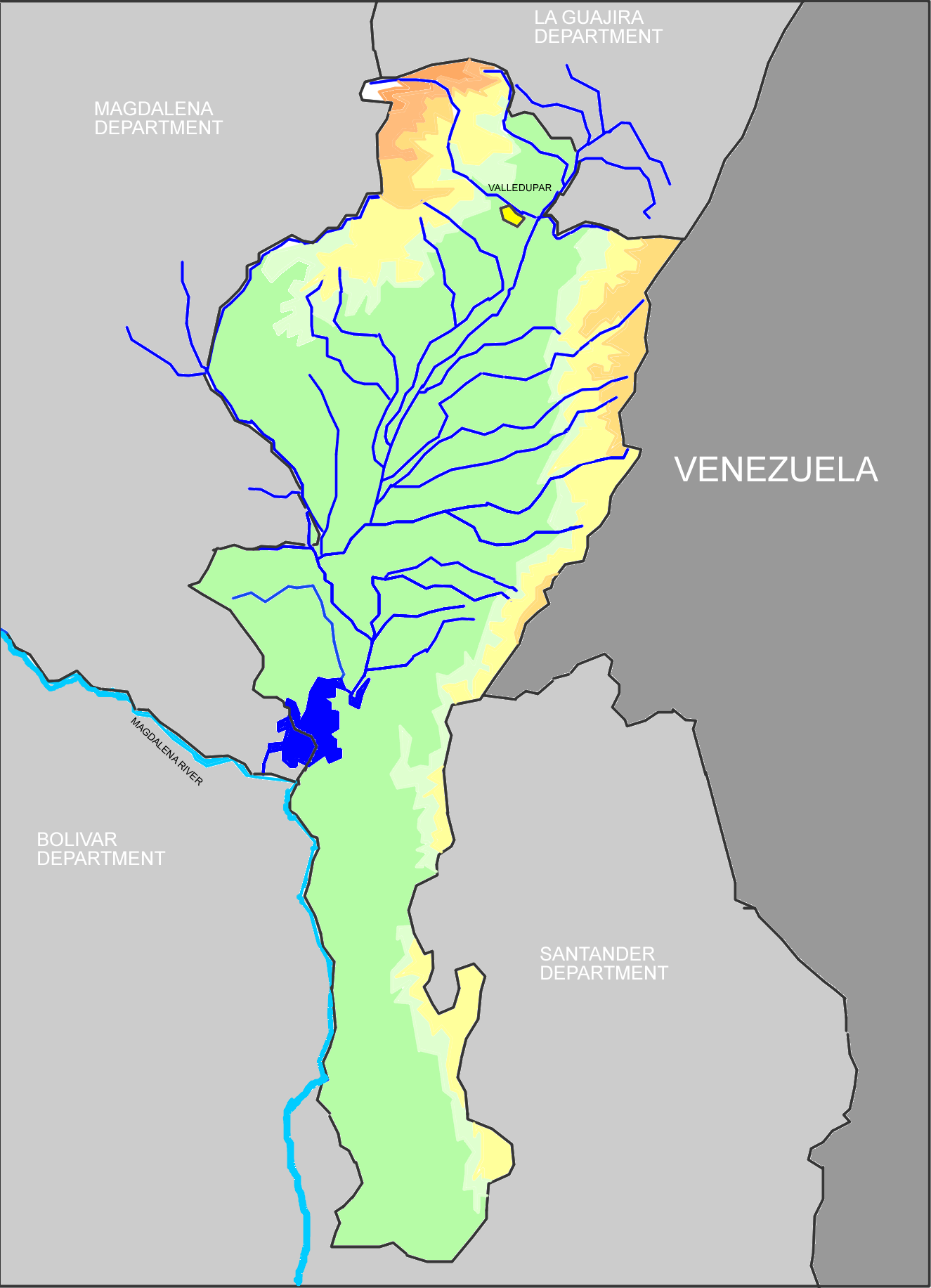
- The Cesar River basin, Cesar Department in color

Location
- Country: Colombia
- Department: Cesar Department

Physical characteristics
- Source
  - location: Colombia
- Mouth
  - location: Magdalena River
  - coordinates: 8.9961°N 73.9678°W
- Length: 280 kilometres (170 mi)
- Basin size: 9,832 square kilometres (3,796 sq mi)

Basin features
- Cities: Valledupar

The Cesar River (Spanish: Río Cesar) is a river in northern Colombia which is a part of the Magdalena Basin. It flows through the Cesar-Ranchería Basin and separates the Sierra Nevada de Santa Marta from the mountain ranges of the Serranía del Perijá, an extension of the Cordillera Oriental. It flows north to south, down from the Sierra Nevada de Santa Marta in the Guajira Department onto the Cesar Department and flowing into the Zapatosa Marsh where it turns to the southwest and discharges into the Magdalena River after 280 kilometers. Valledupar is the only major city on its route.

== Tributaries ==
- Guatapuri River
- Ariguani River
- Badillo River
- Villanueva River, 43 kilometres (27 mi) in length out of the Cerro Pintao.
- Various streams of the Zapatosa Marshes including the
  - Bartolazo wetlands;
  - Pancuiche wetlands;
  - Pancuichito wetlands;
  - La Palma wetlands;
  - Santo Domingo wetlands; and
  - Tiojuancho wetlands.
