= Politics of Valledupar =

Flag of Valledupar

Politics of Valledupar (Spanish: Politica de Valledupar) refers to the political processes in the Colombian city of Valledupar in Cesar Department. The local politics of Valledupar take places within the framework of the Politics of Colombia which are based on a presidential system and representative democratic republic.

== History ==
The Politics of Valledupar has struggled along the political situations of Colombia throughout the years since its creation by Spanish colonizers and its Independence from them. Relatively prompt to political violence the politics of Valledupar have been divided between periods of political instability and periods of relatively political stability along a hegemony between the Colombian Liberal Party and the Colombian Liberal Party following ideals of Colombian Liberalism and Conservatism respectively.

In the early 20th century and with the influence of new political ideals from Europe, Communism spread through Latin America, Colombia and the region of Valledupar. After the end of the Thousand Days War radical liberals in the region started to adopt versions of Colombian communism but have always represented a minority in comparison to the population. The political trend was the caudillismo (strong men) in support of the two main political parties, the conservative and liberal supported by other powerful landowners and selected families. Elections were held only for president and legislature. Within the powers of the President of Colombia (before the constitution of 1991) was the ability to appoint department governors, mayors of municipalities and police inspectors for corregimientos and settlements. In the region of Valledupar the main traditional, political, landowner families were the Castros and the Araujos, whose political hegemony dates back to colonial times of their Spanish ancestors.

The post of Mayor of Valledupar was created in 1915 along with the Municipal Council of Valledupar. The municipal council had very little importance, since the appointed mayor had control over much of the budget and was usually a military man. Councilmen were elected in a single election along with the president and the rest of the legislative branch of government. The region was also greatly influenced by Liberal President Alfonso López Pumarejo whose mother was from Valledupar.

=== During La Violencia ===
During the period of La Violencia very few incidents of political violence occurred in Valledupar, however the repression incidents provoked by the chulavitas (the Conservative government police) were described in vallenato songs.

Politics in Valledupar have been plagued by political scandals and corruption to maintain power. The politics of Economics have also been centered towards an agro-export economy and concerning social changes, the indigenous peoples have also conflicted with these politics since the time of the Colony situation that escalated because of the Catholic Church involvement in their culture and the expropriation of land. There hasn't been any significant agrarian reforms but an improvement in social protection and benefits that began with the election of President Lopez Pumarejo and his "Revolucion en Marcha" (Marching Revolution) program.

During the years of the National Front, communist guerrillas developed during the period of La Violencia under communist ideals started to appear in the region of Valledupar. Political parties also associated with these ideals like the Colombian Communist Party (PCC), the Revolutionary Independent Labour Movement (MOIR) and the Colombian Liberal Party faction Liberal Revolutionary Movement (MRL) developed with a strong militancy of young students to protest the nature of the National Front and the repression of the conservatives governments, among these is former President Lopez-Pumarejo's son Alfonso López Michelsen who pushed for the creation of the Cesar Department and setting Valledupar as its capital along with the aristocrat political leadership of Valledupar. During this time the communist guerrillas began armed incursions against the Colombian army in Valledupar and landowners, with kidnappings for ransom, cattle or agricultural equipment robbing, extorting, but sporadically. Meanwhile, land owners experimented a boom in cotton production that further enriched them throughout the 1970s. Valledupar enjoyed a process of urban development and growth, while the majority maintained a relatively comfortable life.

The cotton bonanza ended with an agricultural crisis and most of the landowners in debt with banks because of loans. This adding to an economic recession that hit Latin America as a whole during the years following the bonanza. This created not only an economic crisis but also a political and social crisis in Valledupar. Peasants began to strike demanding action by the governments of Colombia, Cesar and Valledupar. It was during the 1980s, when the leftist coalition party the Patriotic Union (UP) surged as an alternative to the peasants supports, adding to the Patriotic Union was considered the political wing of the Revolutionary Armed Forces of Colombia (FARC) that had kidnapped and extorted by then hundreds of landowners. To the surprise of the landowners Ricardo Palmera, members of the traditional families of landowners joined the Patriotic Union and later when this party began to be persecuted by paramilitary groups and law enforcement he joined the FARC.

== Requisites ==
The population of Valledupar apt to vote must be Colombian, over the age allowed to vote which is over 18 year of age and a valid ID. The ID number must be registered for vote in the National Registry of the Civil State, the entity in Colombia that within its functions is to control the registry of voters and vote count during an election and also register their IDs in the municipality in which they live. The voter also must be capable of exercise freely its civil and political rights. Candidates also must comply with the rules established in the Constitution of Colombia and the regulations established by the National Electoral Council of Colombia.

== Political parties, movements and groups ==
Valledupar has numerous political movements and groups associated with to the larger political parties of Colombia. Some of these local movements group ideas related to the major political parties and may adhere during an election, but most of the time these movements or group try not to be part of the officialism of a party. There have been two local groups based in Valledupar that have gained important regional or national political support, the now disbanded GOLPE Movement led by the Gneccos and Alternative for Social Advance (ALAS) which joined forces with Team Colombia to create Somos Región Colombia (originally ALAS Equipo Colombia) a major player in the national elections which is led by the Araújo family, mainly Álvaro Araújo Castro.

=== GOLPE Movement ===
GOLPE disbanded after its main leaders were either charged with crimes, threatened by violent groups or assassinated. Lucas Gnecco the head of the clan, was jailed after being accused by the Attorney General of Colombia of committing fraud in 1989 while serving as Governor of Cesar Department along with 47 other members of his administration. Lucas Gnecco was banned from running for office ever again.

His two brothers Jorge and Jose Eduardo "Pepe" Gnecco were subject to persecution by paramilitary leader Rodrigo Tovar Pupo (aka Jorge 40) who assassinated Jorge and kidnapped Jose Eduardo. This kidnapping led to President Álvaro Uribe to threaten Jorge 40 with being extradited and loss of his benefits as part of the agreement with the government during the 2006 demobilization process of the paramilitary groups.

=== ALAS ===
After the weakening of the GOLPE Movement, ALAS led by the Araújo family primarily, gained political power, amid accusations of being benefited by the violent actions of the paramilitary leader "Jorge 40". Four of the most prominent members of the Araújo clan were formerly investigated for their participation in the Colombian parapolitics scandal in which politicians made agreements and pacts with the paramilitary groups to maintain political power. Members of the family with legal problems include former Senator Álvaro Araújo Castro, his father Álvaro Araújo Noguera, his brother Sergio Araújo Casatro and cousin former Governor of Cesar Department Hernando Molina Araújo. Due to this legal problems, then minister of Foreign Affairs Maria Consuelo Araújo Castro, the Araújo Castros' sister resigned despite not being involved in the scandal. Father and uncle in law of the clan is current Inspector General of Colombia Edgardo Maya Villazón who was married to former minister of Culture Consuelo Araújonoguera (Assassinated by the FARC guerrilla in 2002) and faced a lot of criticism due to the problems of his family and has been asked to resign due to conflicts of interests and ethics. Another important politician associated to the Araujos was Mauricio Pimiento which was initially supported by them but later joined the lines of a different political movement. Senator Pimiento was also involved in the Parapolitics scandal and was jailed along with Álvaro Araújo Castro.

=== Forward Valledupar ===
After these scandals Valledupar and the Cesar Department were left without strong political leaders and a coalition of politicians formed from different political parties to recover the political leadership gap left. The coalition was dubbed Adelante Valledupar (Forward Valledupar) and during the 28 October 2007 Colombian regional elections helped to elect as mayor Ruben Carvajal.

== Latest election ==
=== Council of Valledupar ===
- Preferent vote by party 2008–2011
1. . Colombian Liberal Party - 5 seats; 24,146 votes
2. . Colombian Conservative Party – 5 seats 22,012 votes
3. . Forward Valledupar – 2 seats 12,217 votes
4. . Party of the U – 2 seats 9,725 votes
5. . Alas/Team Colombia– 1 seat 8,739 votes
6. . Radical Change – 1 seat 8,425 votes
7. . Indigenous Alliance – 1 seat 8,136 votes
8. . Liberal Aperture– 1 seat 5,965 votes
9. . Alternative Democratic Pole– 1 seat; 5,868 votes
- Elected counselors for Valledupar - 2008 - 2011

Order of listing by party's preferent vote

1. . Yesith Triana (Colombian Liberal Party), 1.925
2. . Gabriel Muvdi (Colombian Liberal Party), 1.749
3. . Ángel Antonio Montaño (Colombian Liberal Party), 1.458
4. . Wisan Hasan (Colombian Liberal Party), 1.337
5. . Fabiola Zuleta (Colombian Liberal Party), 1.311
6. . Alejandro José Rodríguez (Colombian Conservative Party), 1.861
7. . Pedro Venancio Manjares (Colombian Conservative Party), 1.569
8. . Walter Oñate (Colombian Conservative Party), 1.383
9. . Alonso Cuello (Colombian Conservative Party), 1.271
10. . Wilber Hinojosa (Colombian Conservative Party), 1.189
11. . John Jairo Gil (Forward Valledupar), 2.461
12. . Jaime Bornacelly (Forward Valledupar), 1.707
13. . Freddy Gámez (Party of the U), 1.160
14. . Jorge Canales (Party of the U), 950
15. . Leonardo José Maya (Alas/Team Colombia), 1.332
16. . Augusto Daniel Ramírez (Radical Change), 1.367
17. . Gustavo Guerra Añez (Social Indigenous Alliance), 1.107
18. . Álvaro Rosado (Liberal Democratic Aperture), 775
19. . Fabián Hernández Igirio (Alternative Democratic Pole), 564

== See also ==
- List of mayors of Valledupar
- List of governors of Cesar Department
