= Luis Alfredo Ramos =

Colombian politician (born 1948)

Luis Alfredo Ramos Botero
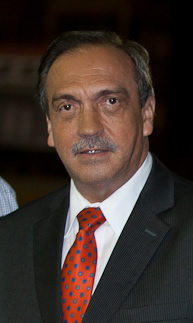

Governor of Antioquia
- In office 1 January 2008 – 1 January 2012
- Preceded by: Aníbal Gaviria
- Succeeded by: Sergio Fajardo

Senator of Colombia
- In office 20 July 2002 – 20 July 2006
- In office 20 July 1990 – 31 July 1991

President of the Senate of Colombia
- In office 20 July 2002 – 20 July 2003
- Preceded by: Carlos García Orjuela
- Succeeded by: Germán Vargas Lleras

Permanent Representative of Colombia to the Organization of American States
- In office October 1998 – 15 March 2001
- President: Andrés Pastrana Arango
- Preceded by: Fernando Cepeda Ulloa
- Succeeded by: Humberto De la Calle Lombana

Mayor of Medellín
- In office 1 January 1992 – 1 January 1995
- Preceded by: Omar Flórez Vélez
- Succeeded by: Sergio Gabriel Naranjo Pérez

3rd Colombian Minister of Foreign Trade
- In office 26 December 1995 – 6 February 1996
- President: Ernesto Samper Pizano
- Preceded by: Daniel Mazuera Gómez
- Succeeded by: Morris Harf Meyer

Member of the Chamber of Representatives of Colombia
- In office 1 July 1982 – 20 July 1990
- Constituency: Antioquia Department

Personal details
- Born: 19 April 1948 (age 78) Sonsón, Antioquia, Colombia
- Party: Conservative
- Other political affiliations: Team Colombia (2002-2004)
- Spouse: María Eugenia Maya Molina
- Children: Alfredo Ramos - Esteban Ramos
- Education: University of Medellín
- Profession: Lawyer

Luis Alfredo Ramos Botero (born 19 April 1948) is a Colombian politician. Most recently, he was the Governor of the Department of Antioquia from 2008 to 2011.

A lawyer and a Conservative politician, Ramos has served as Councillor and Mayor of Medellín, Deputy to the Antioquia Departmental Assembly, Representative and Senator to the Congress of Colombia, and Permanent Representative of Colombia to the Organization of American States among other political posts.

In August 2013, Luis Alfredo Ramos was imprisoned under investigation of the Supreme Court of Justice of Colombia, accused of criminal nexus with paramilitary groups in Antioquia but was later released in November 2016.

== Early years ==
Ramos was born in the municipality and town of Sonsón in the Department of Antioquia on 19 April 1948. Ramos studied law at the Universidad de Medellín and specialized in International Business from Harvard University in the United States.

== Political career ==
In 1972 Ramos is appointed head of the Conservative party post that he held for four years until 1976, he was also elected deputy of the Department Assembly of Antioquia for the period of 1974 and 1976. In 1976 was appointed General Controller of Antioquia, serving until 1978 when he was appointed Secretary of Finance of the City of Medellín until 1980.

=== Congressman ===
Between 1982 and 1990 served as congressman in the Chamber of Representatives of Colombia. In 1990 and 1991 was Senator of Colombia but with the dissolution of Congress by President César Gaviria and the introduction of a Constituent Assembly for a new Constitution Ramos decided not to run again.

=== Mayor of Medellín ===
In 1992 Ramos was elected Mayor of Medellín for the period of 1992–1994. Ramos is dubbed the best Mayor in Colombia.

=== Minister of Foreign Trade ===
In 1996 during the presidency of Ernesto Samper, Ramos was appointed Minister of Foreign Trade, but due to the Proceso 8000 scandal in which it was made public that drug money belonging to the Cali Cartel financed the presidential campaign of Ernesto Samper, the Conservative party cut all ties with the Liberal administration of Samper and Ramos renounced.

=== Ambassador to the Organization of American States ===
After renouncing to his post as minister in the Samper administration, Ramos joined the presidential campaign of Conservative Andrés Pastrana for the presidential elections of 1998. Pastrana was elected president and Ramos was appointed Ambassador of Colombia to the Organization of American States (OAS) until 2001.

=== Senator of Colombia 2002-2006 ===
In 2001 Ramos returned to Colombia and postulated himself as candidate for the Senate of Colombia in representation of the Team Colombia political movement. He was elected in the legislative elections of 2002 with more than 230,000 votes. In his inauguration as senator on 20 July 2002, Ramos was elected also President of the Congress of Colombia and the senate. As president of Congress, he also inaugurated Álvaro Uribe as President of Colombia.

For the legislative elections of 2006 Ramos decided to join political forces with the Alternative for Social Advance (ALAS) movement headed by Álvaro Araújo Castro and created the Somos Región Colombia party (originally Alas Equipo Colombia). The new political party supported the reelection of Álvaro Uribe and most of his policies in congress. Ramos term as senator ended on 19 July 2006. The Alas Equipo Colombia political party crumbled due to the imprisonment of Araujo and other members, involved in the Parapolitica scandal in which politicians colluded with paramilitary groups to coerced voters and opposition candidates to gain political advantage.

=== Governor of Antioquia ===
Ramos decided to postulate his name for Governor of the Antioquia Department in the regional elections of 2007 representing the Alas Equipo Colombia political party. Ramos was elected Governor of the Department of Antioquia on 28 October 2007, obtaining of 99.04% of the voting sites scrutinized 836,526 votes equivalent to 51.73% of the total votes (1,617,065 total votes). Ramos defeated candidate Eugenio Prieto Soto of the del Movimiento Una Antioquia Nueva, who obtained 579,020 votes. Ramos was to be inaugurated as governor on 1 January 2008, for a period of 3 years until 31 December 2011.

On 28 August 2013, the Supreme Court of Justice requested the arrest of former governor for alleged ties with paramilitary forces. The accusation is based on free testimony given by former paramilitary commanders Freddy Rendón Herrera, aka ‘El Alemán’ and Juan Carlos Sierra, aka ‘El Tuso’. On 2015 Freddy Rendón Herrera and Juan Carlos Sierra retracted from the testimony and accepted a plea bargain from Fiscalia General de la Nacion for False Testimony.

== See also ==
- Senate of Colombia
- List of presidents of the Senate of Colombia
