= Edgardo José Maya Villazón =

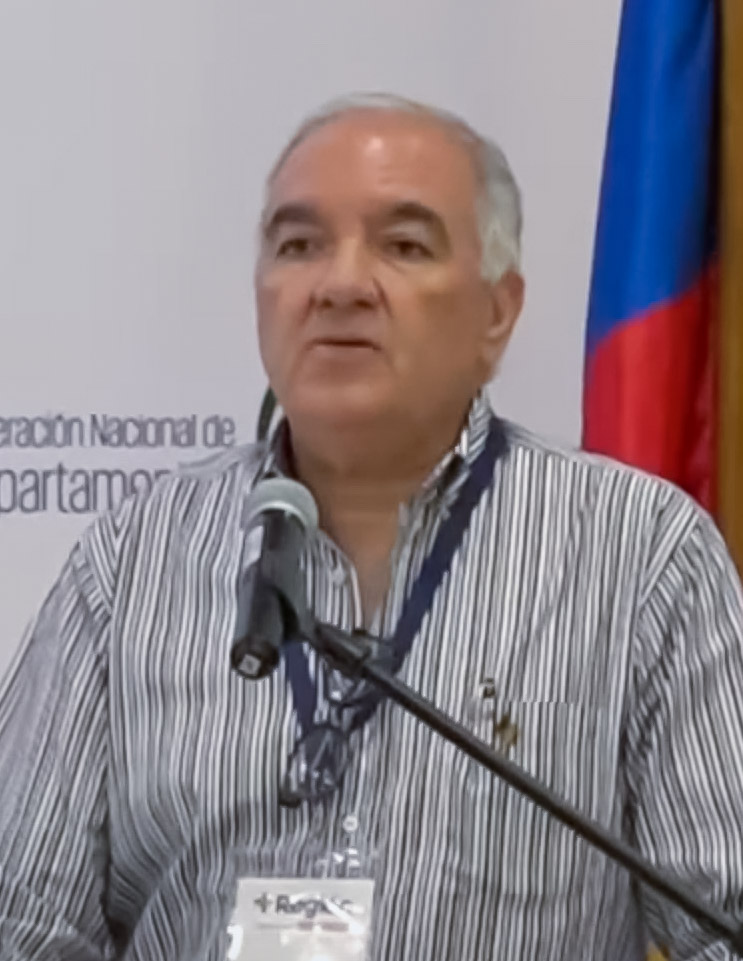

Inspector General of Colombia
- In office January 12, 2001 – January 15, 2009
- President: Andrés Pastrana Arango (2001-2002); Álvaro Uribe Vélez (2002-present)
- Preceded by: Jaime Bernal Cuéllar
- Succeeded by: Alejandro Ordóñez Maldonado

35th Controller General of Colombia
- In office 19 August 2014 – 30 August 2018
- President: Juan Manuel Santos
- Preceded by: Sandra Morelli Rico
- Succeeded by: Carlos Felipe Córdoba

Personal details
- Born: July 24, 1951 (age 75) Valledupar, Cesar, Colombia
- Spouse: Consuelo Araújo
- Relations: Hernando Molina Araújo (stepson); Álvaro Araújo Castro (nephew)
- Children: Edgardo José
- Education: Universidad Externado de Colombia
- Occupation: Professor
- Profession: Lawyer

Edgardo José Maya Villazón (born July 24, 1951) is a Colombian lawyer, and former Inspector General of Colombia and Controller General of Colombia.

== Early years ==
Edgardo Maya studied in the Gimnasio Moderno high school in Bogotá. After he studied law and graduated from the Universidad Externado de Colombia where he also did postgraduate studies in labor law and social security, among others.

== Career ==
Maya began working as a trial lawyer in the city of Valledupar where he became sectional manager of the Social Security Institute. Later he was appointed President of the Superior Council of the Popular University of Cesar (UPC).

He became a law professor at the Jorge Tadeo Lozano University and Universidad Externado de Colombia in which he taught labor and collective law for undergraduate and graduate students.

He was also an auxiliary magistrate of the Labor Cassation Chamber of the Colombian Supreme Court of Justice. He was also Department of Cesar's Auxiliary Comptroller and member of the Redaction Commission of the Statutory Law for Justice Administration and also participated in the reform to the Unique Disciplinary Code (Law 200 of 1995). In 1999, Maya was a delegate of the International Labour Organization. He later became a magistrate of the Superior Council of the Judicature's Jurisdictional Disciplinary Chamber, as president and vice president.

=== Inspector General ===
On January 13, 2001 Maya was appointed Inspector General of Colombia for the 2001–2005 period.

The President of Colombia Álvaro Uribe reappointed Edgardo Maya as for the period of 2005–2009 after a voting session in the Senate of Colombia on November 9, 2004. Maya's appointment ceremony took place in the Casa de Nariño Presidential Palace. This reelection was the cause of numerous criticisms

In 2006 and 2007 Maya was questioned by the Colombian media, opposition politicians and others for the involvement of some members of his stepfamily in a parapolitics scandal. His stepson Governor of Cesar Department, Hernando Molina was accused of being part of an AUC paramilitary bloc and for benefiting from the paramilitary support to threaten other candidates running for Governor to resign. His nephew in law and former Senator of Colombia Álvaro Araújo Castro and his father Álvaro Araújo Noguera (Maya's brother in law) were also questioned and indicted in parapolitics related activities.

=== Comptroller General of the Republic ===
Maya was appointed Comptroller General of the Republic on August 19, 2014, and finished his appointment in August 2018.

== See also ==
- 2006–2007 Colombian parapolitics scandal
- Consuelo Araújo
