= Governor of Antioquia =

Head of government of the Department of Antioquia

Governor of the Department of Antioquia
- Arms of Antioquia

- Flag of Antioquia

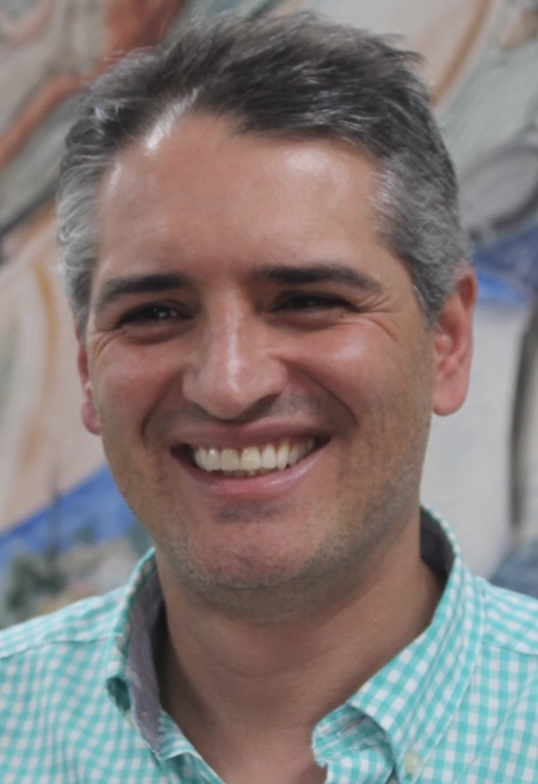
- Incumbent; Andrés Julián Rendon since January 1, 2024
- Department of Antioquia
- Style: Governor (informal); The Honorable (formal)
- Type: Head of state Head of government
- Residence: None official
- Nominator: Political Parties
- Appointer: Popular vote
- Term length: Four years; limited to two consecutive terms
- Constituting instrument: Constitution of Colombia
- Formation: Departments of Colombia: June 1856; Current form: 1019

The Governor of Antioquia heads the executive branch of the government of the Antioquia Department in Colombia. The governor is the highest-ranking official in the department and is elected by popular vote. The current governor is Aníbal Gaviria.

== List ==
Conservative Liberal Green Alliance Democratic Center
No.	Portrait	Governor	Term of office		Acting governor
1		Juan Gómez Martínez; May 12, 1962 (Age 64)	January 1, 1992 – August 7, 1994		Ramiro Valencia Cossio (1994–1995)
2		Álvaro Uribe; July 4, 1952 (Age 74)	January 1, 1995 – January 1, 1998		-
3		Alberto Builes	January 1, 1999 – December 31, 2000		-
4		Guillermo Gaviria Correa; November 27, 1962 – May 5, 2003 (Aged 40)	January 1, 2001 – April 21, 2002	-	
		Eugenio Prieto; September 10, 1962 (Age 63)	December 25, 2002 – December 31, 2003		
5		Aníbal Gaviria; January 16, 1966 (Age 60)	January 1, 2004 – December 31, 2007		Eugenio Prieto (2006–2006); Claudia Restrepo (2006–2007)
6		Luis Alfredo Ramos; April 19, 1948 (Age 78)	January 1, 2008 – December 31, 2012		Andrés Julián Rendon(2008–2008); Mauricio Villegas(2009–2009)
7		Sergio Fajardo; June 19, 1956 (Age 70)	January 1, 2013 – December 31, 2015		Claudia Luz Mejía (2014–2014)
8		Luis Pérez Gutíerrez; November 30, 1951 (Age 74)	January 1, 2016 – December 31, 2019		-
9		Aníbal Gaviria; January 16, 1966 (Age 60)	January 1, 2020 – December 31, 2023		Luis Fernando Suárez (2020–2021) Juan Pablo López (2023–2023); Luz Elena Gaviria (2023–2023)
10		Andrés Julián Rendon	January 1, 2024 – Incumbent		
