= Somos Región Colombia =

Colombian right-wing political party

Somos Región Colombia Partido Somos Región Colombia
- Founded: 2005 (ALAS Team Colombia); 2015 (Council of State); 2017 (National Electoral Council)
- Dissolved: 2018
- Merger of: Alternative for Social Advance and Team Colombia
- Preceded by: ALAS Team Colombia
- Ideology: Social Conservatism; Anti-Communism; Christian Confessionalism; Regionalism; Previously: Liberalism; Uribism; Conservatism
- Political position: Right wing to Far-Right

Website
- Partido Somos

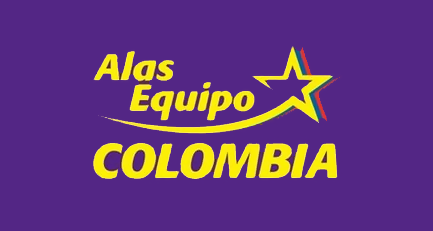
Logo for its predecessor, ALAS-Team Colombia

The Somos Región Colombia Party (Spanish: Partido Somos Región Colombia), or simply Partido Somos, sometimes We are Colombia (Somos Colombia), was a Colombian political party and successor to the ALAS Team Colombia party, a center-right political alliance born from the merging of the Liberal Alternative for Social Advance (ALAS) party, founded by Álvaro Araújo Castro, and the Team Colombia party, which ran in the March 2006 Legislative Elections. ALAS Team Colombia was a part of a coalition of parties that supported the 2002-2010 Álvaro Uribe Vélez campaign and government. The alliance between the two parties ended in September 2009, after a mutual agreement to dissolve; ALAS retained its legal status as a party, while Team Colombia members mostly joined the Colombian Conservative Party. ALAS, however, did not obtain the necessary number of votes in the following 2010 Colombian Legislative Election to maintain its legal status as a valid political party. But, in 2017 it was able to restore its legal status as the Partido Somos Región Colombia.

Since early 2018, together with the Democratic Center, Colombia Justa Libres, and MIRA parties, Somos had been a part of the Great Alliance for Colombia (Spanish: Gran Alianza por Colombia), which campaigned to elect then senator Iván Duque Márquez as President of Colombia. The major Colombian Liberal Party and Colombian Conservative Party would both later joined the alliance, and Duque Marquez won the 2018 Presidential Election, serving until 2022.

== History ==
=== ALAS ===
The Alternative for Social Advance (Alternativa Liberal de Avanzada Social, ALAS) was a movement that emerged in the 1990s as an internal sect of the Colombian Liberal Party confined to the Cesar department, for which its leader and founder, Álvaro Araújo Castro, occupied a seat in the House of Representatives. In the 2002 Elections, Araujo Castro was elected to the Senate, and in 2003, Hernando Molina Araújo, who would later be implicated in the parapolitics scandal alongside Castro and suspended from office, reached the governorship of Cesar under the Colombian Liberal Party with the support of the ALAS.ALAS decided to separate from the Colombian Liberal Party to support the government of President Uribe and, in 2005, began a process of merging political forces with senators Elmer Arenas and Leonor Serrano de Camargo, but failed after they joined the Union Party for the People. However, two years later in 2007, Leonor Serrano joined ALAS Team Colombia to run as their candidate for mayor in Bogotá from 2008 to 2011, as the Union Party for the People had rejected endorsing him.

=== Team Colombia ===
Team Colombia was a political movement founded by the former mayor of Medellín and former minister Luis Alfredo Ramos in the mid-1980s within the Colombian Conservative Party. It was created to counter-balance the other conservative movement in Antioquia, the Progressive Force of Courage (Fuerza Progresista del Coraje). After discreet participation at the national level,- with their lone senate seat occupied by Gabriel Zapata Correa from 1994 to 2002 acting in line with the Conservative Party, in the 2002 election Ramos decided to head a Senate party campaign, obtaining more than 230,000 votes and three seats, in addition to senator Huila Jaime Bravo. In 2003, they successfully entered Bogotán politics, obtaining seats in the District Council. In 2004, Team Colombia withdrew from the Colombian Conservative Party to pursue its own path in legislative elections.

=== Merger ===
On December 14, 2005, the merger between the ALAS Party and the Team Colombia Movement was formalized, creating ALAS Team Colombia. The president of the party was Ramos, and the head of its parliamentary branch was former senator Álvaro Araújo. The new party, defined as Uribista, claimed to differentiate itself from other Colombian political parties in its supposed regional grassroots origins. In the 2006 legislative elections, the party won 5 seats in the Senate and several more in the House.

=== Partido Somos Región Colombia ===
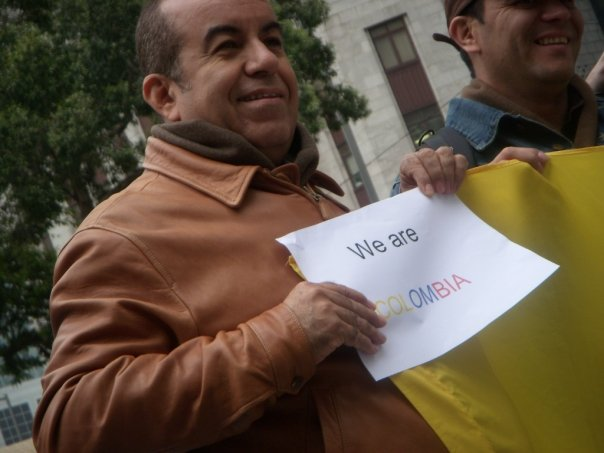

In 2013, the State Council, through a July 13 order, provisionally suspended the National Electoral Council's 2010 decision on the loss of, what was now, Somos Región Colombia's legal status. As of September 2019, there had been no substantive follow up decision on the loss of legal status for this reason. In the 2018 presidential and congressional elections, the party did not obtain enough votes to maintain its legal status, placing 8th out of the 8 presidential candidates. Somos's presidential candidate was Viviane Morales and its vice presidential candidate was Jorge Leyva Durán.

== Controversy ==
At the end of 2006, then senator Álvaro Araújo Castro, who was the head of the party in parliament, was called to testify in an investigation into multiple politician's alleged links with Colombian paramilitarism, specifically the United Self-Defense Forces of Colombia (AUC). During his testimony, Senator Araújo acknowledged that he was present at a party also attended by paramilitary boss Rodrigo 'Jorge 40' Tovar Pupo, but denied any other links to paramilitaries. Several factions within Congress criticized Araújo Castro, demanding he resign and face the accusation against him. By order of the Colombian Supreme Court of Justice, he was detained on February 15, 2007. His seat was then occupied by Senator Antonio Valencia Duque from the Antioquia Department, an ally of Luis Alfredo Ramos Botero, who was also under investigation for links with paramilitaries. He voluntarily resigned from his position in Congress on March 27, 2007, in order to be investigated by the Prosecutor's Office instead of the Supreme Court of Justice. Araújo faced charges of conspiracy to commit a crime and kidnapping for the purpose of extortion. These were for his alleged participation in the abduction of his opponent Victor Ochoa Daza before the 2002 elections, he was facing up to 40 years in prison for these charges. The investigation was closed in 2009 without a conviction, apparently due to contradictory witness testimony. In 2021, Team Colombia founder, who joined the Conservative party after the ALAS-Team Colombia split in 2010, Luis Alfredo Ramos was convicted by the Supreme Court for involvement with paramilitarism.

== See also ==
- Team Colombia
- Alternative for Social Advance (ALAS)
- Álvaro Araújo Castro
- Viviane Morales
- Colombian parapolitics scandal
