= José Antonio Murgas =

Colombian politician (1930–2024)

José Antonio Murgas Aponte

Minister of Labour and Social Security
- In office 17 April 1973 – 7 August 1974
- President: Misael Pastrana Borrero
- Preceded by: Crispín Villazón de Armas
- Succeeded by: María Elena Jiménez de Crovo

Governor of the Department of Cesar
- In office 22 August 1970 – 17 June 1971
- President: Misael Pastrana Borrero
- Preceded by: Alfonso Araújo Cotes
- Succeeded by: Manuel Germán Cuello

Personal details
- Born: 1930
- Died: 24 May 2024 (aged 94) Valledupar, Cesar Department, Colombia
- Party: Liberal
- Spouse: Margarita Puche Lacouture
- Children: Carlos Murgas Puche
- Occupation: Politician

José Antonio Murgas (1930 – 24 May 2024) was a Colombian politician. He was minister of work and social security under the presidency of Misael Pastrana by Decree 739 of 17 April 1973, replacing Crispín Villazón de Armas. Murgas was also appointed governor of the Department of Cesar between 22 August 1970 and 17 June 1971. Murgas was also the ambassador of Colombia to the United Nations.

Murgas died on 24 May 2024, at the age of 94.

== Governor of Department of Cesar (1970–1971) ==
=== Cabinet ===
- Secretary of government: Jaime Calderón Bruges
- Secretary of development: José María Oñate Araújo
- Secretary of finances: Rafael González Daza
- Secretary of education: José Díaz Cuadro
- Chief of planning: Luis Enrique Durán Arias
- Chief of Judicial Bureau: Nestor Vizcaino
