= Aníbal Gaviria =

Colombian politician (born 1966)

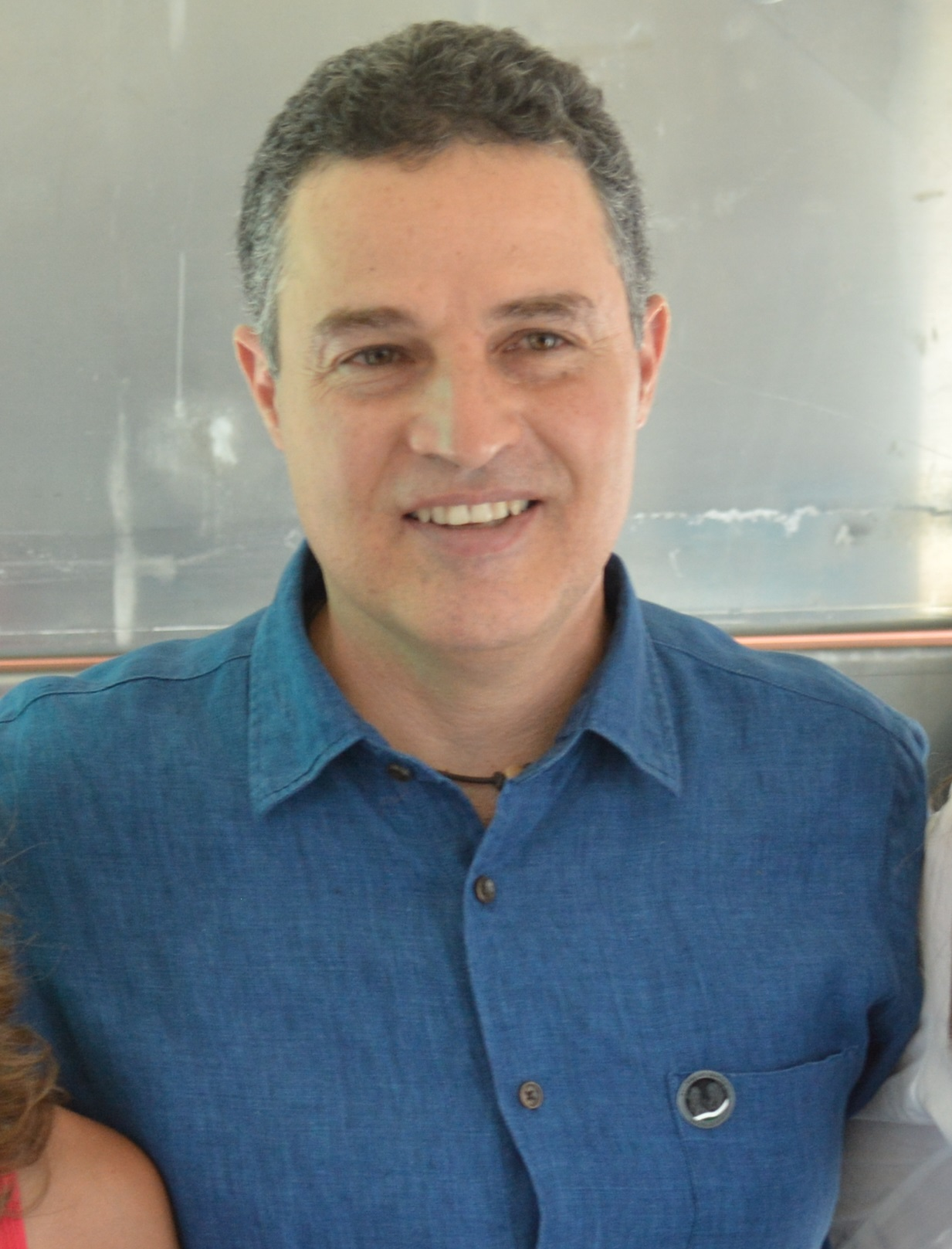

Governor of Antioquia
- In office 1 January 2020 – 31 December 2023
- Preceded by: Luis Pérez Gutiérrez
- Succeeded by: Andrés Julián Rendon
- In office 1 January 2004 – 31 December 2007
- Preceded by: Eugenio Prieto Soto
- Succeeded by: Luis Alfredo Ramos

Mayor of Medellín
- In office 1 January 2012 – 31 December 2015
- Preceded by: Alonso Salazar
- Succeeded by: Federico Gutiérrez

Personal details
- Born: 16 January 1966 (age 60) Medellín, Antioquia, Colombia
- Party: Liberal Party
- Education: EAFIT University; Harvard University
- Occupation: Politician
- Website: http://anibalgaviria.tumblr.com

Aníbal Gaviria Correa (born 16 January 1966) is a Colombian politician who has served as the governor of Antioquia since 2020. Prior to this, Gaviria was the Mayor of Medellín from 2012 to 2015 and served as a visiting scholar at University of California, Berkeley. He previously served as Governor of Antioquia from 2004 to 2007.

== Biography ==
=== Education ===
Gaviria studied business administration at EAFIT University, and he later studied at Harvard Extension School.

=== Political career ===
During his career in the public administration is to be highlighted his term as Governor of Antioquia between 2004 and 2007, where he directed the management efforts to unified the work with other actors in the state towards the pursuit of higher levels of equity and development for the citizens of Antioquia.

In 2007 the “Proyecto Líder Colombia” recognized him as the best Governor of Colombia. As a leader his management reached 89% favorability. In 2009 he was a presidential candidate of the Liberal Party and then vice presidential running mate of his party in the 2010 elections.

He was elected as mayor of the city of Medellin for the period 2012–2015. He was previously the governor of Antioquia Department from 2004 to 2007. He is a member of the Liberal Party.

Political offices
Preceded by Eugenio Prieto Soto	Governor of Antioquia; 2004–2007	Succeeded by Luis Alfredo Ramos
Preceded by Alonso Salazar	Mayor of Medellín; 2012–2015	Succeeded by Federico Gutiérrez
Preceded by Luis Pérez Gutiérrez	Governor of Antioquia; 2020–present	Incumbent
