= Fernando Araújo Perdomo =

Colombian politician (born 1955)

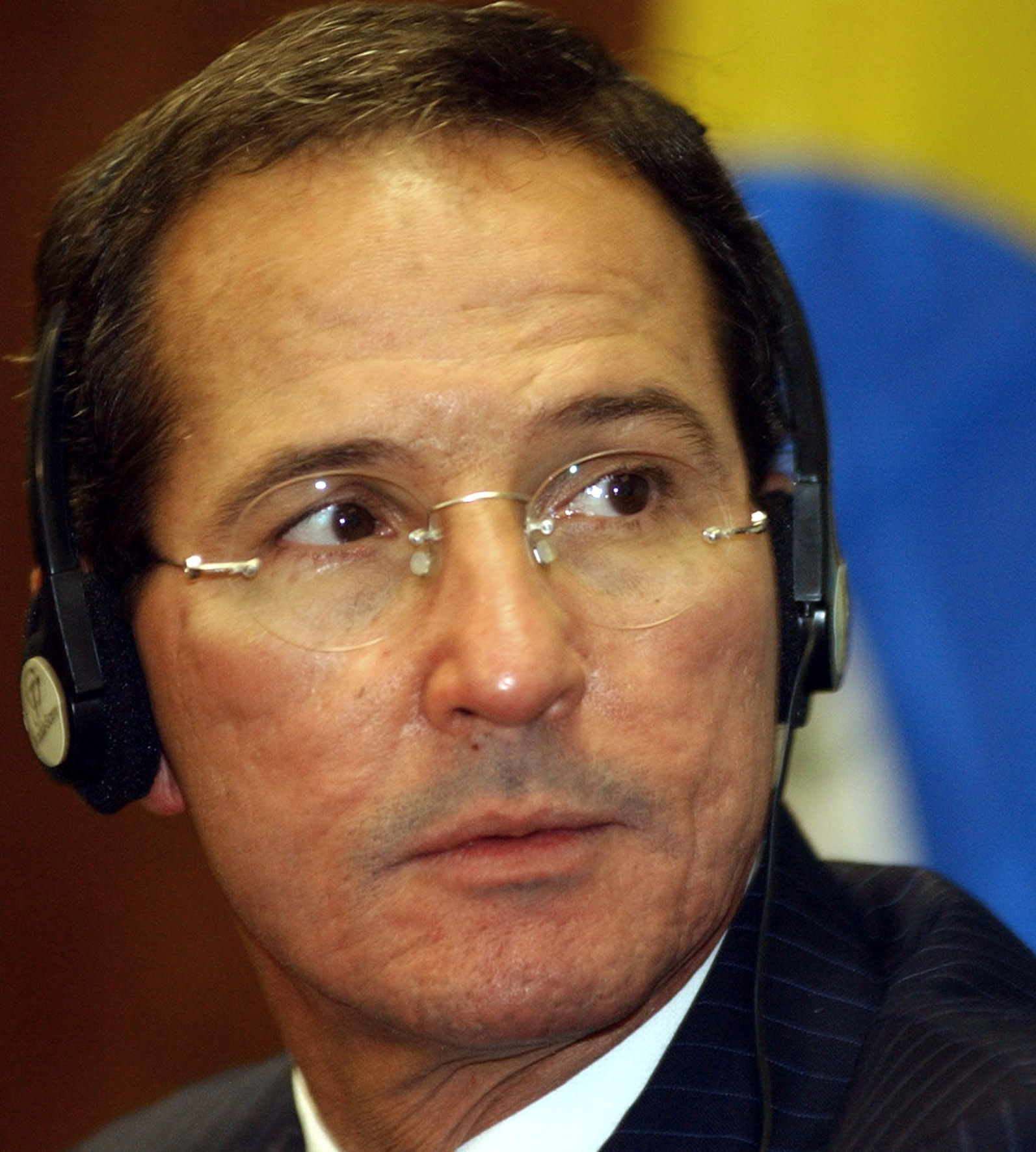

Minister of Foreign Affairs
- In office February 19, 2007 – July 16, 2008
- President: Álvaro Uribe Vélez
- Preceded by: María Consuelo Araújo
- Succeeded by: Jaime Bermúdez Merizalde

Minister of Economic Development
- In office 1998–1999
- President: Andrés Pastrana Arango

Personal details
- Born: June 27, 1955 (age 71) Cartagena, Bolívar, Colombia
- Party: Conservative
- Spouse(s): Ruby Rumié; Mónica Yamhure Gossaín
- Children: Manuel Santiago; Sergio Alejandro; Fernando Nicolás; Luis Ernesto
- Education: Pontifical Xavierian University
- Occupation: Politician, professor
- Profession: Civil Engineer
- Website: https://web.archive.org/web/20090123004133/http://feraraujo.com/

Fernando Araújo Perdomo (born 27 June 1955) is a Colombian politician. He was the Minister of Development during the administration of Andrés Pastrana. He resigned from this post after the Chambacú land deal scandal. He was later kidnapped by the FARC-EP guerrillas and held for six years until he eventually escaped. Two months later after his liberation, President Álvaro Uribe appointed him as Minister of Foreign Affairs.

== Education ==
Araújo graduated from high school in the Colegio La Salle in the city of Cartagena. He then moved to Bogotá and studied civil engineering at the Pontifical Xavierian University.

== Chambacú case ==
Araújo resigned after Ignacio Gómez published in El Espectador the note "Chambacú, corral de empresarios", in which he was accused of participating in a corrupt land deal.

== Kidnapping ==
While he was under investigation, Araújo was kidnapped on December 4, 2000, near his home in Cartagena by the Revolutionary Armed Forces of Colombia and escaped more than six years later, on December 31, 2006, after a Colombian National Army military operation in the Montes de María mountains in the southern regions of the Bolivar Department. Araújo spent several days in hiding without food or water until eventually finding help and then facing the press on January 5, 2007.

== Minister of Foreign Affairs ==
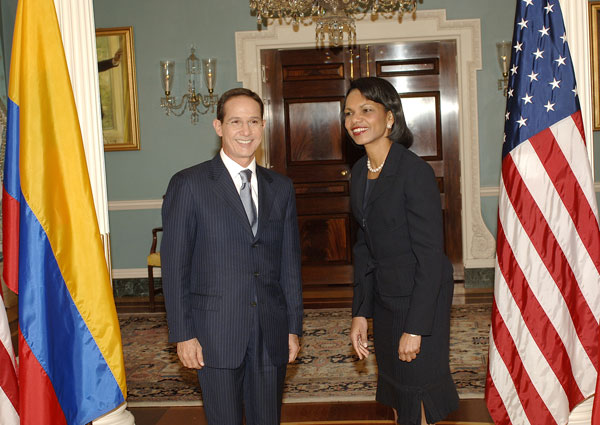
Araújo with Condoleezza Rice.

On February 19, 2007, Araújo was appointed as new Minister of Foreign Affairs by President Álvaro Uribe, replacing María Consuelo Araújo (no relation to Fernando Araújo) who resigned due to her brother's involvement in the 2006–2007 Colombian para-political scandal. Araújo resigned from the post on July 16, 2008.

== Personal life ==
Araújo is one of the eight children of Alberto Araújo Merlano and Judith Perdomo. Araújo's brothers and sisters are Alberto Ignacio, Liana, Gerardo, Judith Elvira, Carolina, Juan Carlos and Rodrigo.

=== First marriage ===
Araújo had four sons from his first marriage; Manuel Santiago, Sergio Alejandro, Fernando Nicolás and Luis Ernesto.

=== Second marriage ===
Araújo's second marriage was with Mónica Yamhure Gossaín. They had been married for only seven months and were planning to have a child when he was kidnapped on December 4, 2000, by the FARC guerrillas. Coincidentally it was on Yamhure's birthday. She left him while he was in captivity and remarried. Araújo found out about this upon his arrival to Cartagena on January 5, 2007, a few hours after being evacuated from the Montes de María jungle mountains in southern Bolivar. He was surprised by her absence after his release and asked his brother about her whereabouts, who told him of her leaving.
