= María Consuelo Araújo =

Colombian politician (b. 1971)

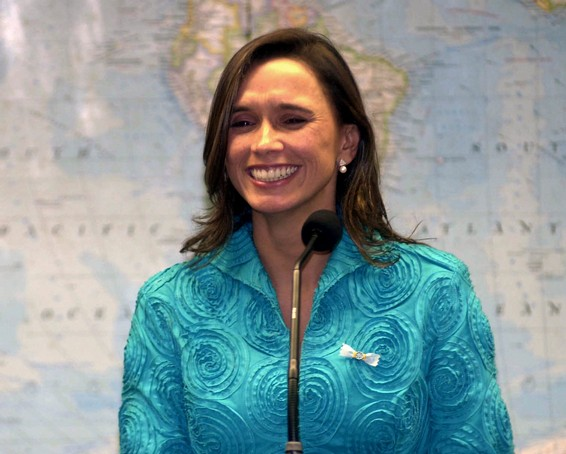
- María Consuelo Araújo in 2006

Minister of Foreign Affairs
- In office 7 August 2006 – 19 February 2007
- President: Álvaro Uribe Vélez
- Preceded by: Carolina Barco Isakson
- Succeeded by: Fernando Araújo Perdomo

Minister of Culture
- In office 7 August 2002 – 25 January 2006
- President: Álvaro Uribe Vélez
- Preceded by: Aracely Morales López
- Succeeded by: Elvira Cuervo Uribe

Personal details
- Born: María Consuelo Araújo Castro; 27 October 1971 (age 54) Valledupar, Cesar, Colombia
- Spouse: Ricardo Mazalán
- Relations: Álvaro Araújo Noguera (father); Álvaro Araújo Castro (brother); Consuelo Araújo Noguera (aunt); Hernando Molina Araujo (cousin)
- Children: Susana Mazalán Araújo
- Education: Universidad Externado de Colombia, University of Milan
- Profession: Economist, diplomat

María Consuelo "Conchi" Araújo Castro (Valledupar, October 27, 1971) is a Colombian politician. She was Minister of Culture from 2002 to 2006, and Minister of Foreign Affairs from 2006 to 2007 in the government of Álvaro Uribe Vélez. Later, during the second Mayor's Office of Enrique Peñalosa, she was Secretary of Social Integration of Bogotá and manager of TransMilenio. She is currently the CEO of Gran Colombia Gold Corp. and part of the Mañanas Blu team with Néstor Morales.

== Biography ==
=== Personal life ===
Araújo comes from a family closely linked to politics. Her father, Álvaro Araújo Noguera, was part of the government of Alfonso López Michelsen, her aunt Consuelo Araújo Noguera was Minister of Culture of Andrés Pastrana and her brother, Álvaro Araújo Castro, was a senator and leader of the ALAS-Team Colombia.

She studied Finance and International Relations at the Externado University of Colombia and is a specialist in Government, Management and Public Affairs from the same institution. She was director of the José Celestino Mutis Botanical Garden during the administration of Enrique Peñalosa as Mayor of Bogotá (1998–2000) and of the city's District Institute of Recreation and Sports, under the government of Antanas Mockus (2001–2003).

After resigning from her position as chancellor she went on to serve as postgraduate director of the Faculty of Finance, Government and International Relations of the Externado University of Colombia.

She is married to the Argentine photographer Ricardo Mazalán and has a daughter, Susana, in 2002.

=== Ministerial positions ===
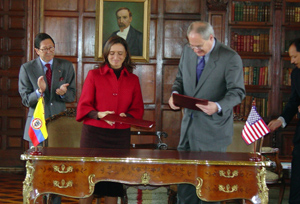

During the first term of President Álvaro Uribe Vélez (2002 - 2006), Araújo served as Minister of Culture. In 2006, after a diplomatic crisis caused by former presidents Ernesto Samper and Andrés Pastrana, Araújo, who had been designated as a future ambassador to Mexico, was appointed chancellor, replacing Carolina Barco, who went on to replace Andrés Pastrana in the United States embassy. position he held since August 7 of the same year.

On 19 February 2007, she resigned from her ministerial portfolio following the arrest of her brother, Senator Álvaro Araújo Castro, investigated and charged with giving support to paramilitary groups active in the country's ongoing internal conflict. Her father was under investigation for the same crimes.

She recommended Fernando Araújo Perdomo (no relation) and he was appointed as new minister by the president.

=== Post resignation ===
She has been the CEO of Gran Colombia Gold Corp. since 20 August 2010.

Araújo returned to public service during the second administration of Enrique Peñalosa. In 2016, she was appointed Secretary of Social Integration of Bogotá, overseeing the city's social welfare, child protection, elderly care, homelessness, disability, and poverty-reduction programs.

In February 2018, Peñalosa appointed her General Manager of TransMilenio, Bogotá's mass transit authority.

In December 2025, the National Board of the Colombian Chamber of Infrastructure unanimously elected Araújo as its next Executive President. She formally assumed office on 25 February 2026, succeeding Juan Martín Caicedo Ferrer after more than two decades in the role.
