= List of people called by the Colombian Supreme court in the parapolitics scandal =

The following is a list of people called by the Colombian Supreme Court in the Colombian parapolitics scandal. Going to court does not mean being indicted.

== List ==
Name	Role(s)	ref
Mario Uribe Escobar	Álvaro Uribe's cousin and former senator	
Horacio Serpa	former presidential candidate	
Luis Ernesto Mejía	former minister	
Álvaro Araújo Noguera		
Luis Humberto Gomez Gallo	former President of Congress	
Sergio Araújo Castro		
Coronel Hernán Mejía		
Lucas Gnecco Cerchar	former governor of Cesar Department	
Juan Carlos Vives		
Bernardo Hoyos	former mayor of Barranquilla	
Eleonora Pineda		
Salomón Saade	former congressperson	
Javier Castro Alfaro		
Álvaro Castro Socarrás		
Andrés Camilo Castro		
Rodith Trespalacios		
Édgar Arce		
John Medina Rojas		
Cesar Giraldo		
José Luis Laborde Gómez		
Coronel Orlando Páez Barón		
Luis Alberto Monsalvo		
José Gnecco Cerchar	former senator	
Lilio de Gnecco		
Álvaro Morón		
Israel Obregón		
José Elías Cruz Romero		
Gerardo Jaime		
Santander Mejía Araújo		
Ricardo Chajin		
Luis Enrique Mora Zequeria		
Óscar Pavón		
Libardo García		
Jorge Vega		
Hernán Baute Arrázola		
Luis Fernando Barrios		
Rafael Díaz Pérez		
Martha Stumo		
Dino Gravini Donado		
Leonardo Melo		
Andrés Mesa		
José Morillo		
José María Sierra		
Carlos Tomás Severino		
José Domingo Dávila		
Martha Romero Villa		
Fernando Piscioti		
José David González		
Tico Velaides		
Lucho Bruges		
Aníbal Martínez		
Jaime Martínez		
Simón Villamizar		
Edilberto López Campo		
Rafael Díaz		
Isa Eljaude		
Roberto Martínez		
Handy Stumo		
Enrique Osorio de la Rosa		
Augusto Castro Pacheco		
Libardo Duarte		
Guillermo Sánchez Quintero		
José María Barrera		
Rafael Bolaños	former governor of Cesar Department	
Víctor Ochoa		
Juana Ramírez		
