= Alfonso Araújo Cotes =

Colombian politician (1924–2023)

Colombian Ambassador to Panama
- In office 1990–1997
- President: César Gaviria Trujillo; Ernesto Samper Pizano
- Preceded by: Francisco José Jattin Safar
- Succeeded by: Edgardo Sales Sales

9th Governor of the Department of Cesar
- In office 7 June 1975 – 30 August 1977
- President: Alfonso López Michelsen
- Preceded by: Ernesto Palencia Caratt
- Succeeded by: Armando Barros Baquero

3rd Governor of the Department of Cesar
- In office 21 September 1968 – 21 August 1970
- President: Carlos Lleras Restrepo
- Preceded by: Luis Roberto García Díaz-Granados
- Succeeded by: José Antonio Murgas

Personal details
- Born: 2 September 1924
- Died: 19 April 2023 (aged 98)
- Party: Liberal
- Other political affiliations: Movimiento Revolucionario Liberal

Alfonso Araújo Cotes (2 September 1924 – 19 April 2023) was a Colombian politician, two-time Governor of the Department of Cesar; the first term between 21 September 1968, and 21 August 1970, and the second term between 7 June 1975, and 30 August 1997.

Araújo died on 19 April 2023, at the age of 98.

== Governor of Department of Cesar (1968-1970) ==
=== Cabinet ===
- Secretary of Government: Luis Rodriguez Valera
- Secretary of Development: Jesus Alejo Duran
- Administrative Office Chief: Adalberto Ovalle
- Chief of Planning: Francisco Ramos Pereira
- Chief of Judicial Bureau: Jorge Eliecer Rincon
- Private Secretary: Pedro Garcia Diaz
