= Ciro Arturo Pupo Castro =

Colombian attorney and politician

Mayor of Valledupar
- In office January 1, 2004 – December 31, 2007
- Preceded by: Elias Ochoa Daza
- Succeeded by: Rubén Alfredo Carvajal Riveira

Personal details
- Born: April 11, 1961 (age 65) Barranquilla, Atlántico, Colombia
- Party: Liberal Party
- Spouse: Obeida Lucia Salgado Zequeda
- Relations: Rodrigo Tovar Pupo (cousin)
- Education: Saint Thomas Aquinas University
- Profession: Lawyer

Ciro Arturo Pupo Castro (born April 11, 1961 in Barranquilla) is a Colombian attorney, politician and former Mayor of the Colombian city of Valledupar. He was elected mayor as a member of the Colombian Liberal Party.

He is the son of Edgardo Pupo Pupo and Nelly Castro Baute; his father was governor of the Department of Cesar and also mayor of Valledupar.

Pupo is a lawyer graduated from the Saint Thomas Aquinas University with an MBA. He is a first cousin to Rodrigo Tovar Pupo (aka Jorge 40) a United Self-Defense Forces of Colombia paramilitary leader.

His first marriage was to Indira María Gutierrez, former pageant queen of Bambuco Pageant and Folkloric Festival. He has two children with her, Ciro Arturo y Sebastián de Jesús. He is currently married to Obeida Lucia Salgado Zequeda with whom he has one son, Oscar Miguel.
