= Cecilia Caballero Blanco =

First Lady of Colombia from 1974 to 1978

Cecilia Caballero de López
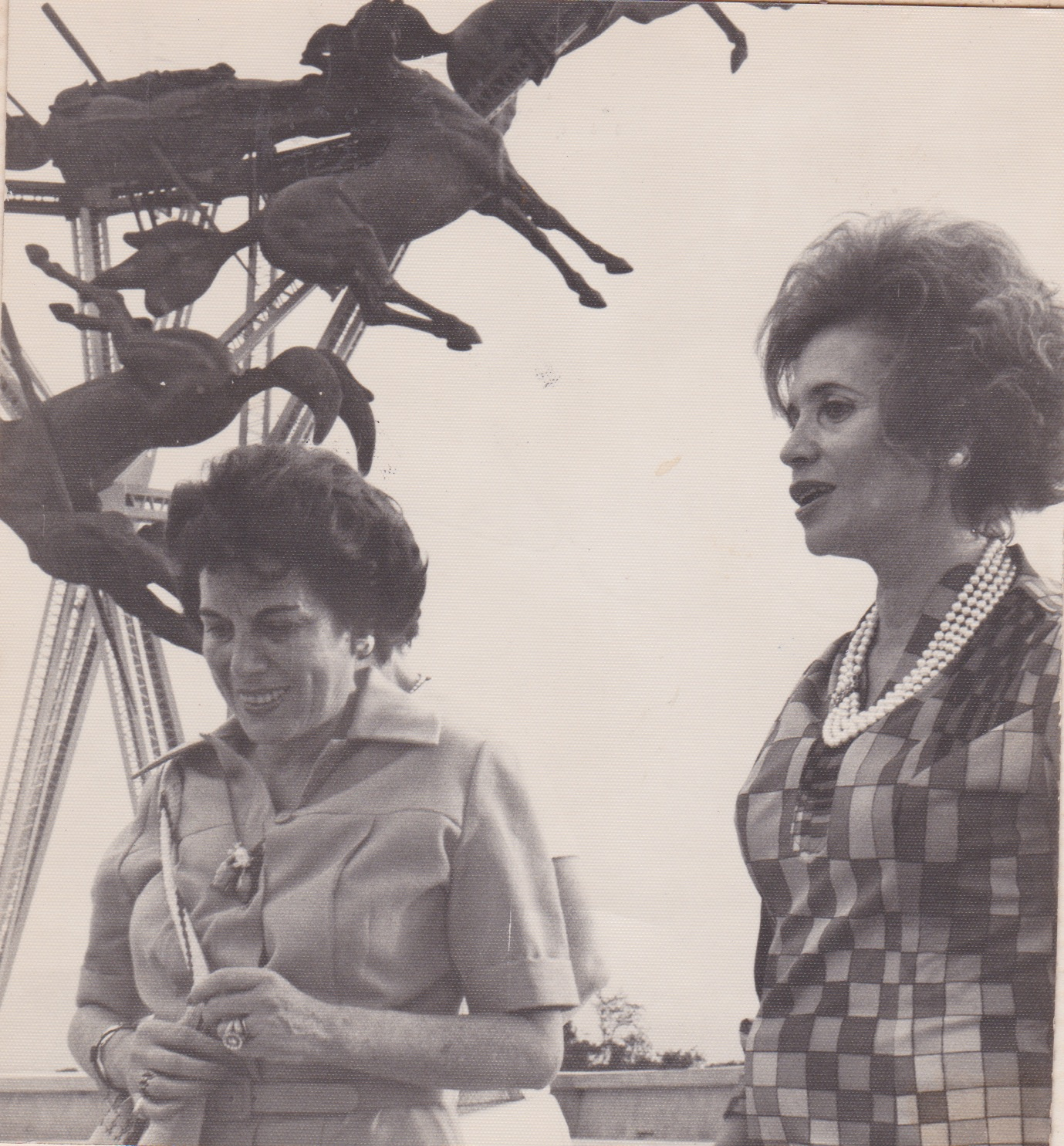
- 1993 photograph by Hernán Díaz.

First Lady of Colombia
- In role August 7, 1974 – August 7, 1978
- President: Alfonso López Michelsen
- Preceded by: María Cristina Arango Vega
- Succeeded by: Nydia Quintero

First Lady of Cesar
- In office 21 December 1967 – 14 August 1968
- Governor: Alfonso López Michelsen
- Preceded by: Position established
- Succeeded by: Margarita Puche Lacoutire

Personal details
- Born: Cecilia Caballero Blanco; September 30, 1913 Bogotá, D.C., Colombia
- Died: August 13, 2019 (aged 105) Bogotá, D.C., Colombia
- Party: Liberal
- Spouse: Alfonso López Michelsen (m. 1938; died 2007)
- Children: Alfonso López Caballero; Juan Manuel López Caballero; Felipe López Caballero

Cecilia Caballero Blanco de López (née Caballero Blanco; 30 September 1913 – 13 August 2019) was the first lady of Colombia from 1974 to 1978 as the wife of Alfonso López Michelsen, the 25th president of Colombia. Caballero de López was also first lady of Cesar from 1967 to 1968 when her husband was governor.

== Personal life ==
Cecilia was born on 30 September 1913 in Bogotá to Julio Caballero Barrera and Mary Blanco Barroso. She married Alfonso López Michelsen, lawyer and politician on 23 October 1938. They had three sons: Alfonso, an economist and diplomat, Juan Manuel, and Felipe. She turned 100 in September 2013, and died on 13 August 2019 at the age of 105. She was also the longest lived First Lady of Colombia.

Honorary titles
New title	First Lady of Cesar; 1967-1968	Next: Margarita Puche Lacoutire
Preceded by María Cristina Arango	First Lady of Colombia; 1974–1978	Succeeded by Nydia Quintero
