= Consuelo Araújo =

Colombian politician (1940–2001)

Consuelo Araújo Noguera

Minister of Culture
- In office 18 July 2000 – 11 March 2001
- President: Andrés Pastrana
- Preceded by: Juan Luis Mejía
- Succeeded by: Araceli Morales López

Personal details
- Born: Consuelo Inés Araújo Noguera; 1 August 1940 Valledupar, Cesar, Colombia
- Died: 30 September 2001 (aged 61) Valledupar, Cesar, Colombia
- Cause of death: Assassination by firearm
- Spouse(s): Hernando Molina Céspedes; Edgardo Maya Villazón
- Relations: Álvaro Araújo Castro (nephew); María Consuelo Araújo (niece)
- Children: 6, including Hernando Molina Araújo
- Occupation: Journalist, politician
- Nickname: La Cacica

Consuelo Inés Araújo Noguera (1 August 1940 – 30 September 2001), also known as "La Cacica", was a Colombian politician, writer and self-taught journalist. Her nickname was given by a fellow journalist colleague for her tenacity and determination to achieve goals and leadership.

Her most notable achievement was the creation of one of the most important cultural and musical events of Colombia, the Vallenato Legend Festival, which promoted her beloved Vallenato music.

She was kidnapped by the FARC on 24 September 2001 on the outskirts of Valledupar and was killed six days later by this guerrilla group to prevent her from being rescued by the Colombian Army on 30 September 2001 during a heavy military operation.

== Early life ==
Consuelo Inés Araújo Noguera was born on August 1, 1940, in Valledupar, Cesar, Colombia, the youngest of nine siblings. Her father, Santander Araújo, was a respected politician, militant and regional leader of the Liberal Party around Valledupar, whose firm character largely influenced his daughter.

She went to a government public nursery school and subsequently attended Escuela Tercera para Niñas. She then transferred to the Colegio Nariño Middle School and later to the Nuestra Señora del Carmen. She attended high school at the Colegio de la Sagrada Familia.

At the age of fifteen, she dropped out of high school and started to work as a bank teller to help pay for the schooling of three of her older brothers. During this period she also spent her spare time reading and self-educating.

== Career ==
=== Journalist and writer ===
Largely self-educated, Araújo was committed to becoming a freelance journalist and writer. She started as a writer for a national newspaper El Espectador, also writing a column called "La Carta Vallenata" (The Vallenata letter), published for 22 years in the same newspaper. She also collaborated with RCN Radio and RCN TV networks, and El Heraldo, a Barranquilla newspaper between 1988 and 1989. Between 1984 and 1985 she worked as a reporter in Valledupar for the Noticiero del Medio Día, a national news show. She also worked as a radio host for her own show La Cacica Contesta on Radio Guatapuri, a radio station in Valledupar owned by her family.

=== Politician ===
Always a defender of the unprotected and poor, Araújo was a harsh critic of local governments' and politicians' abuses of power and advocated women empowerment, but most of all she was devoted to the local customs and culture of Valledupar. This devotion for people pushed her to run for the governorship of the Department of Cesar, which she lost; she later became Minister of Culture for the Colombian government during Conservative president Andrés Pastrana's term.

== The Vallenato Legend Festival ==
In 1968, with the help of former Liberal president of Colombia and then acting first governor of the Cesar Department; Alfonso López Michelsen and Vallenato composer Rafael Escalona, she founded the Vallenato Legend Festival, a festival whose primary purpose was to celebrate a religious legend about a miracle by Virgin Mary during the colonial times over a fight between Spanish settlers and Indians; but the people focused more on the music, which ended up overshadowing the other events. Thus the main purpose of the festival changed, becoming a vehicle for showing and exalting local customs and culture, including the dances, music, arts and crafts, and the whole diversity of people from the region.

== Assassination ==
=== Abduction ===
On 24 September 2001, Araújo was kidnapped by the FARC on the outskirts of Valledupar.

=== Murder and investigation ===
Six days later after her captivity, she was shot dead and her body was found with two shots in the head and with gunpowder burns, indicating that the shots were probably fired at close distance by her kidnappers. Araújo's family, the Colombian government, and the OAS condemned the FARC as the party responsible for the assassination. The FARC blamed the Army for provoking the situation that led to her death.

== Personal life ==
Consuelo Araújo was first married to Hernando Molina Céspedes and had five children, Hernando César, María Mercedes, Rodolfo Augusto, Ricardo Mario and Andrés Alfredo. She later divorced and married Edgardo Maya, Colombia's Inspector General of Colombia as for 2007, with whom she had the last of her children, named Edgardo José, born in 1980. She was the aunt of politicians Álvaro Araújo, former Senator of Colombia, and María Consuelo Araújo, former Minister of Culture (2002–2006) and former Foreign Relations Minister (2006–2007).

== Relevant works ==
=== Books ===
- Vallenatologia, origenes y fundamentos de la musica Vallenata, Bogota, Ediciones Tercer Mundo (1973).
- Escalona, El hombre y el mito, Bogota, Planeta Editorial (1998).
- Lixicon del Valle de Upar, voces, modismos, giros, interjecciones, locuciones, dichos, refranes y coplas del habla popular vallenata, Bogota, Instituto Caro y Cuervo (1994).
- Trilogia Vallenata, Homenaje a Consuelo Araujonoguera, Bogota, Editorial Bailonia (2002). (Compilation of Consuelo Araujonoguera's three books) ISBN 958-33-3360-3

=== Short stories ===
- "Yo sabía" (1976), short story - Winner, "Cote Lamus" Story Contest, in Cúcuta.

== See also ==
- List of solved missing person cases: post–2000
