= María Cristina Arango Vega =

First Lady of Colombia from 1970 to 1974

María Cristina Arango
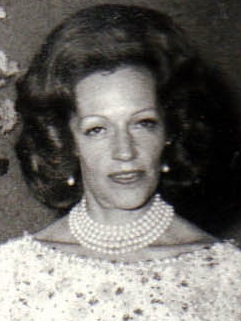
- Arango de Pastrana in 1974

First Lady of Colombia
- In role 7 August 1970 – 7 August 1974
- President: Misael Pastrana Borrero
- Preceded by: Cecilia de la Fuente de Lleras
- Succeeded by: Cecilia Caballero Blanco

Personal details
- Born: María Cristina Arango Vega; 15 October 1928 Bogotá, D.C., Colombia
- Died: 15 September 2017 (aged 88) Bogotá, D.C., Colombia
- Party: Liberal
- Spouse: Misael Pastrana Borrero (m. 1951; died 1997)
- Relations: Pastrana family
- Children: 4, including Andrés
- Parent(s): Carlos Arango Vélez; María Vega de Arango

María Cristina Arango de Pastrana (née Arango Vega; 15 October 1928 – 15 September 2017) was the first lady of Colombia from 1970 to 1974, as the wife of Misael Pastrana, the 26th president of Colombia. Among her children is Andrés Pastrana, the 33rd President of Colombia. Arango de Pastrana, Enriqueta Vásquez de Ospina, and María Michelsen de López are the only three women who have been the wife of a Colombian president and the mother of another. Arango de Pastrana was generally popular as First Lady due to her liberal political positions, which contrasted with the conservative policies of her husband.

María Cristina Arango was born in Bogotá, D.C. She met Misael Pastrana in 1946, they became engaged in the middle of that same year, and married in February 1951. Arango de Pastrana became First Lady in 1970 after her husband's inauguration as President. During her time at the Casa de Nariño, she dedicated herself fully to directing the Colombian Institute of Family Welfare, characterized by her liberal approach. She continued to actively participate in political campaigns after leaving the Casa de Nariño, as her eldest son, Andrés, ran for mayor of Bogotá and president.

== Personal life ==
María Cristina Arango Vega was born on 15 October 1928, in Bogotá, D.C., to the liberal politician Carlos Arango Vélez and María Vega de Arango (née Vega Jaramillo). Her father served as Mayor of Bogotá from 1935 to 1936. Later, in 1942, he received the Liberal party's nomination for the 1942 presidential elections, but was defeated by President Alfonso López Pumarejo, who won the majority of votes and secured the Liberal nomination that year.

She met Misael in Rome, Italy, in 1946 while her father was serving as Colombia's ambassador to the Vatican City. The couple became engaged that same year and married on 24 February 1951, in the Chapel of the Madonna Della Strada at the San Bartolomé School in Bogotá. The couple had four children: Juan Carlos, Andrés, Jaime, and Cristina.

María Cristina and Misael lived their retirement outside Bogotá. She campaigned for her son in the 1998 presidential election, maintaining a low profile. After Misael's death in 1997, María Cristina withdrew from public life, returning in 1998 for Andrés Pastrana's inauguration.

In 2010, María Cristina became the second oldest former first lady, after Cecilia Caballero Blanco. María Cristina died on 15 September 2017, at the age of 89.

Honorary titles
Preceded by Cecilia de la Fuente de Lleras	First Lady of Colombia; 1970–1974	Succeeded by Cecilia Caballero Blanco
