= Alfonso López Caballero =

Colombian politician and diplomat (born 1944)

Colombia Ambassador to the United Kingdom
- In office 7 November 2002 – 7 December 2006
- President: Álvaro Uribe
- Preceded by: Víctor Guillermo Ricardo
- Succeeded by: Carlos Medellin Becerra

Minister of the Interior and Justice
- In office 9 January 1998 – 7 August 1998
- President: Ernesto Samper
- Preceded by: Carlos Holmes Trujillo
- Succeeded by: Néstor Humberto Martínez

Colombia Ambassador to Canada
- In office 1994–1998
- President: Ernesto Samper
- Succeeded by: Fabio Avella Martínez

Minister of Agriculture and Rural Development
- In office 25 November 1991 – 4 March 1993
- President: César Gaviria
- Preceded by: María del Rosario Sintes
- Succeeded by: José Antonio Ocampo

Colombia Ambassador to France
- In office September 1990 – November 1991
- President: César Gaviria
- Preceded by: Fernando Rey Uribe
- Succeeded by: Álvaro Gómez Hurtado

Senator of Colombia
- In office 7 August 1990 – September 1990

Member of the Chamber of Representatives
- In office 7 August 1986 – 7 August 1990
- Constituency: Cundinamarca

Personal details
- Born: Alfonso López Cabellero; 17 August 1944 (age 82) Bogotá, D.C., Colombia
- Party: Liberal
- Spouse: Josefina Andrew (m. 1969)
- Relations: Alfonso López Pumarejo (grandfather); María Michelsen de López (grandmother)
- Parent(s): Alfonso López Michelsen (father); Cecilia Caballero de López (mother)
- Education: Georgetown University (B.Sc.); INSEAD (MBA); Columbia University (MA)
- Profession: Economist

Alfonso López Caballero (born 17 August 1944) is a Colombian economist and diplomat, the son and grandson of former Presidents of Colombia, Alfonso López Michelsen and Alfonso López Pumarejo respectively, and former congressman, government minister, ambassador to France, Canada, the United Kingdom, and presidential candidate.

== Background ==
Alfonso López Caballero was born in Bogotá, D.C., Colombia, to Alfonso López Michelsen and Cecilia Caballero Blanco on August 17, 1944, during the second presidency of his grandfather Alfonso López Pumarejo. He married on February 22, 1969, in Caracas, Venezuela, to Josefina Milagros Andreu Roca.

Educated first in the traditional Gimnasio Moderno of Bogotá, he finally concluded his secondary education in the United States after following his family into exile in 1952, when during the government of Mariano Ospina Pérez La Violencia against liberals targeted his family and burned down his grandfather's house. Afterwards he attended Georgetown University, his father's alma mater, where he received his Bachelor of Science in International Relations with an specialization in Economics, from then he moved to France where he attended the European Institute for Business Administration, INSEAD and received a Master of Business Administration. He moved back to the United States where he entered Columbia University received his Master's in Economics, re-enlisted as a PhD candidate in Economics but did not finish.

== Career ==
He started his professional career in the economic sector, first as Assistant Manager of CitiBank in Colombia, and then as a consultant for Arthur Young & Co.

López Caballero was ambassador to France, from where he returned to serve president Gaviria as his minister for agriculture. He served as ambassador to Canada and then returned to Colombia to serve as minister of interior.

López Caballero's effectiveness and his lack of interest for the spotlight is what led president Pastrana to appoint him as one of the government's negotiators during the peace process with the FARC communist guerrillas. During the peace negotiations he earned the respect and the trust of the top members of the guerrilla group, mainly due to his clarity, his understanding of the country and its politics, and more importantly, to the sincerity and openness with which López Caballero faced the multiple discussions . Earning this recognition from the FARC was seen as quite remarkable by some commentators given that López Caballero was clearly a representative of the political, social and economic elite of the country .

Going against his father's ideas once again, López Caballero supported Álvaro Uribe from the beginning of his presidential campaign while López Michelsen supported Horacio Serpa. López Caballero was appointed ambassador to the United Kingdom by president Uribe where he was instrumental in strengthening commercial links and in gaining support for an offensive against the guerrillas, paramilitaries and organized crime .
