= Cristian Moreno Panezo =

Colombian politician (born 1970)

33rd Governor of the Department of Cesar
- In office January 1, 2008 – December 31, 2011
- Preceded by: Hernando Molina Araujo

Personal details
- Born: September 22, 1970 (age 55) Bogotá, Colombia
- Party: Green Party of Colombia Option Center
- Profession: Lawyer, politician

Cristian Moreno Panezo (born 22 September 1970) is a Colombian politician and lawyer from the Universidad del Atlantico with a specialization in constitutional law from the National University of Colombia. On 28 October 2007, Moreno was elected as Governor of Cesar Department for the period of 2008 to 2011. He became the first independent candidate to win in the Cesar Department.

== Early years ==
Moreno started his political career after running for the Department Assembly of Cesar (Asamblea Departamental del Cesar) and was elected deputy, for which he served one term. He was later appointed Regional Director of the National Service of Apprenticeship (Servicio Nacional de Aprendizaje, SENA) in Valledupar and later as advisor to the IberoAmerican States Organization (Organización de Estados Iberoamericanos, OEI).

== First candidacy for Governor of Cesar Department ==
Moreno became notable in the local politics of Cesar Department during the 2003 Colombian regional and municipal elections, when he ran for the governorship of Cesar Department against Hernando Molina Araújo and Abraham Jose Romero. During these elections, paramilitary groups associated to the United Self-Defense Forces of Colombia (AUC) and led by Rodrigo Tovar Pupo threatened him and Romero in order to benefit candidate Molina, who was the candidate of their choice. Both candidates retreated from the race, alleging that the electoral process was rigged.

== Second candidacy for Governor of Cesar Department ==
In 2007, Moreno postulated his name again for the governorship of Cesar Department during the 2007 Colombian regional and municipal elections representing the Opción Centro of the Green Alliance party. On 24 September 2007, Moreno signed an agreement with the Alternative Democratic Pole (PDA) and summoned political forces in Cesar Department.

On 28 October 2007, Moreno was elected by the largest difference in an election for governor in the Cesar Department obtaining 140,789 votes against the candidates Arturo Calderón, 93,739 votes and Jaime Murgas Arzuaga with 47,746 votes. He became the first independent candidate to win in the Cesar Department history, traditionally dominated by traditional parties such as the Liberal and Conservative parties.
