= Alfredo Vázquez Carrizosa =

Colombian lawyer, politician and diplomat

Delegate to the Constituent Assembly of Colombia
- In office 5 February 1991 – 4 July 1991

13th Colombia Ambassador to the United Kingdom
- In office 15 January 1973 – 28 November 1977
- President: Misael Pastrana Borrero
- Preceded by: Julio César Turbay Ayala
- Succeeded by: Jaime García Parra

Minister of Foreign Affairs of Colombia
- In office 7 August 1970 – 7 August 1974
- President: Alfonso López Michelsen
- Preceded by: Indalecio Liévano Aguirre
- Succeeded by: Misael Pastrana Borrero

Permanent Representative of Colombia to the Organization of American States
- In office 8 November 1963 – 1967
- President: Guillermo León Valencia

Personal details
- Born: 9 February 1909 Bogotá, D.C., Colombia
- Died: 19 December 2001 (aged 92) Bogotá, D.C., Colombia
- Party: Conservative
- Spouse: Lucía Holguín Pardo (m. 1961)
- Relations: Alfredo Vázquez Cobo (father)
- Education: Catholic University of Leuven
- Profession: Lawyer

Alfredo Vazquez Carrizosa (9 February 1909 – 19 December 2001) was a Colombian lawyer, politician and diplomat, born in Bogotá, Cundinamarca. He was the foreign minister of Colombia from 1970 to 1974.

Carrizosa was the son of General Alfredo Vasquez Cobo, the Conservative Party's candidate for President of the Republic in 1930. He did his secondary and higher education in Belgium and graduated as a lawyer at the Catholic University of Leuven. He was linked during the decade from 1930 to the International Labour Organization, becoming the Colombian delegate during World War II, when its offices were relocated to Canada.

On his return to Colombia, he was elected to the House of Representatives for Cundinamarca, but steered clear of the Conservative Party's internal divisions. He was uninvolved, therefore, in the coup d'état of 1953. From 1958, during the reign of the National Front, Carrizosa continued his diplomatic career as Ambassador of Colombia to the United Kingdom, Belgium, the United Nations and the Organization of American States, until he attained the post of foreign minister in 1970.

After leaving the Foreign Ministry, Carrizosa devoted himself entirely to the cause of human rights, founding (and, from 1979, chairing) the Permanent Committee for the Defense of Human Rights. In 1991, he was elected to the Constituent Assembly of Colombia, representing the leftist movement Patriotic Union as its oldest constituent. He died in Bogotá on December 19, 2001. Noam Chomsky counts himself as among his admirers.

== Personal life ==
Alfredo was born in Bogotá on 9 February 1909 to Alfredo Vázquez Cobo and Ana Carrizosa Tanco. He married Lucía Holguín Pardo on 17 June 1961 in Bogotá.
