= Luis Roberto García =

Colombian politician

2nd & 6th Governor of Cesar
- In office August 15, 1974 – March 13, 1975
- Preceded by: Manuel Germán Cuello
- Succeeded by: Guillermo Baute Pavajeau
- In office August 16, 1968 – September 28, 1968
- Preceded by: Alfonso López Michelsen
- Succeeded by: Alfonso Araújo Cotes

Personal details
- Party: Conservative
- Occupation: Politician

Luis Roberto García Díaz-Granados was a Colombian politician and two time Governor of the Department of Cesar. He also served as Viceminister of Labor and Social Safety under the administration of President Julio César Turbay Ayala.

== Governor of Cesar ==
García's first term was as interim governor appointed by President Carlos Lleras Restrepo to replace his predecessor Alfonso López Michelsen for whom García worked with, as his Secretary of Government. He served as interim governor between August 15, 1968, and September 20 of the same year.

His second term was a full term appointment between August 14, 1974, and March 13, 1975, appointed by his predecessor and then President of Colombia Alfonso López Michelsen.

=== (1974–1975) Cabinet ===
- Secretary of Government: Gustavo Casado
- Secretary of Finance: Eugenio Felipe Sanchez
- Secretary of Development: Lucas Monsalvo Villazon
- Secretary of Education: Amadeo Rodriguez Queruz
- Chief of Planning: Luis Eduardo Vides Gomez
- Chief of Judicial Bureau: Alfonso Daza Fuentes
- Secretary General: Mendelson Ruiz Vence
