= Álvaro Araújo Castro =

Colombian politician

Senator of Colombia
- In office 17 February 2005 – 7 May 2007
- In office 20 July 2002 – 17 August 2004

Member of the Chamber of Representatives of Colombia
- In office 20 July 1994 – 20 July 2001
- Constituency: Cesar Department

Personal details
- Born: 7 November 1967 (age 58) Santa Marta, Magdalena, Colombia
- Party: Team Colombia
- Other political affiliations: Somos Región Colombia; Alternative for Social Advance; Liberal
- Relations: María Consuelo Araújo Castro (sister); Consuelo Araújo Noguera (aunt); Hernando Molina Araújo (cousin)
- Education: Universidad Externado de Colombia
- Profession: Economist

Álvaro Araújo Castro (born 7 November 1967) is a Colombian economist and former actor and Senator of Colombia. A Liberal politician, leader of the ALAS-Team Colombia political movement, and founder of Alternative for Social Advance (ALAS); he was arrested and jailed in 2007 for participating in parapolitics. Prior to serving in the Senate, he was also a Member of the Chamber of Representatives of Colombia from 1994 to 2001.

== Career ==
After graduating as Economist from the Externado University in Bogotá, 27-year-old Araújo ran for the Chamber of Representatives, representing the Liberal Party and was elected. Two years later, along with his father, he founded a dissident political movement called Alternative for Social Advance (ALAS). After his second term in the Chamber, he ran for the Senate receiving more than half of his votes from the department of Cesar and Bogotá, where he got the highest vote for someone from the Caribbean Region. His movement supported Álvaro Uribe for the Presidency of Colombia.

Flyer of Álvaro Araújo for the senate.

The voter turnout in the Cesar raised suspicion, because of the influence of paramilitary forces in the area. In May 2005, Semana published an article revealing a possible plan by paramilitary forces to influence elections. The Department of Cesar was divided into two zones, the G-8, formed by 8 municipalities in central Cesar Department where revenues from mining industry are high, and in which Senator Mauricio Pimiento and Representative Jorge Enrique Ramírez got most of their votes, and the G-11, formed mostly by southern municipalities where Representative Miguel Duran Gelvis and Senator Araújo had a high turnout. Araújo responded to these accusations by citing years of hard work politics and his family's influence in the region. He also pointed out that results, like the ones in Tamalameque where he received more than 70% of the total votes, were easily explained because of the influence of his third runner-up, Ricardo Chajín Florián, who had been Mayor of Tamalameque.

In the Senate, Araújo was a member of the Fifth Commission of the Senate in which he promoted Hydrocarbon projects and proposed the Mines Code which is cited for duplicating the production of coal in Colombia. He was also a proponent of equal ownership rights for gay couples, and integrating demobilized members of the Cacique Nutibara Bloc into the Armed Forces of Colombia if they met certain judicial requisites.

He was temporarily replaced in the Senate from 17 August 2004 to 17 February 2005 by Ricardo Chajín Florián, the third-runner up in his list.

== Parapolitica scandal ==
On January 19, 2006 Araújo was first accused by then candidate for Senate Gustavo Petro, of having ties with paramilitary groups headed by the now demobilized paramilitary leader Jorge 40 and his men. The Supreme Court of Colombia investigated the accusations in what became known as the Parapolitics scandal, as a result, on 16 February 2007, Araújo was arrested along with other senators for having ties to illegal paramilitary groups.

=== Accomplice in kidnapping ===
Arising from his investigation in parapolitics, Araújo was also formally accused of the kidnapping and extortion of former Mayor of Valledupar, Elías Ochoa Daza's brother Víctor. He was found guilty of the charges and sentenced to 9 years and 3 months of prison on March 18, 2010.

== Family ==
Álvaro was born on 7 November 1967 to Álvaro Araújo Noguera and María Lourdes Castro, and he is married to Sandra Estevao. Of his four siblings, Sergio and Ana María were implicated in the parapolitics scandal, María Consuelo was Minister of Foreign Affairs, and Sara Araújo Castro is a journalist.

== Acting spell ==
Álvaro represented Miguel Casares in the Colombian drama Escalona aired in the beginning of the nineties and produced by Caracol Televisión.
