= Rodolfo Campo Soto =

Colombian politician (born 1942)

Mayor of Valledupar
- In office January 1, 1998 – December 31, 2000
- Preceded by: Johnny Pérez Oñate
- Succeeded by: Elias Ochoa Daza
- In office January 1, 1992 – December 31, 1994
- Preceded by: Fausto Cotes Núñez
- Succeeded by: Johnny Pérez Oñate

Personal details
- Born: August 15, 1942 (age 84) Valledupar, Cesar, Colombia
- Party: Conservative
- Education: Pontifical Bolivarian University
- Occupation: Politician
- Profession: Mechanical engineer

Rodolfo Campo Soto (born August 15, 1942) is a Colombian politician and Mechanical engineer from the Pontifical Bolivarian University. Campo Soto became the first elected Mayor of Valledupar in 1992, and was reelected again for a second term in 1998.
