= List of governors of Cesar Department =

Number of governors of the Department of Cesar by party affiliation
Party	Governors
Liberal	16
Conservative	5
Green	1

The governor of Cesar Department is the popularly elected leader of the department of Cesar in northern Colombia to manage executive functions.

Since the establishment of the Cesar Department on December 21, 1967, governors were appointed by the president of Colombia until the Colombian Constitution of 1991 changed it to election by popular vote.

== Governors ==
Order	Image	Governor	Term	Notes
1		Alfonso López Michelsen	December 21, 1967 - August 14, 1968	First Governor of the Department of Cesar
2		Luis Roberto García	August 16, 1968 - September 28, 1968	Interim
3		Alfonso Araújo Cotes	September 21, 1968 - August 21, 1970	
4		José Antonio Murgas	August 22, 1970 - June 17, 1971	
5		Manuel Germán Cuello	June 19, 1971 - August 13, 1974	
6		Luis Roberto García	August 14, 1974 - March 13, 1975	
7		Guillermo Baute Pavajeau	March 14, 1975 - May 19, 1975	
8		Ernesto Palencia Caratt	May 22, 1975 - June 5, 1975	Interim
9		Alfonso Araújo Cotes	June 7, 1975 - August 30, 1977	
10		Armando Barros Baquero	August 31, 1977 - April 25, 1978	
10		Jaime Murgas Arzuaga	April 25, 1978 - August 24, 1978	
11		José Guillermo Castro Castro	August 25, 1978 - March 12, 1981	
12		Carmen García Vargas	March 12, 1981 - March 23, 1981	Interim
13		Jorge Dangond Daza	March 23, 1981 - August 27, 1982	Appointed by General Gustavo Rojas Pinilla.
14		Edgardo Pupo Pupo	August 27, 1982 - August 23, 1983	
15		Luis Rodriguez Valera	August 23, 1983 - August 25, 1986	
16		Maria Inés Castro de Ariza	August 25, 1986 - March 6, 1987	
17		Alfredo Araujo Castro	March 7, 1987 - April 13, 1989	Interim
18		Paulina Mejía de Castro	April 14, 1989 - February 8, 1990	
19		Armando Maestre Pavajeau	February 9, 1990 - September 2, 1990	
20		Adalberto Ovalle Muñoz	September 3, 1990 - June 14, 1991	
21		Juan Carlos Quintero Castro	June 15, 1991 - July 18, 1991	
22		Abraham José Romero	July 19, 1991 - November 13, 1991	
23		Carlos Alberto Henao	November 14, 1991 - January 1, 1992	
24		Lucas Segundo Gnecco Cerchar	January 1, 1992 - January 1, 1995	First popularly elected governor
25		Mauricio Pimiento	January 1, 1995 - January 1, 1998	
26		Lucas Segundo Gnecco Cerchar	January 1, 1998 - 2000	
27		César Gustavo Solano Noriega	2000	Interim
28		Rafael Bolaños Guerrero	January 1, 2001 - January 1, 2004	
29		Hernando Molina Araujo	January 1, 2005 - May 17, 2007	Involved in the Colombian parapolitics scandal
30		Luis Carlos Ramirez Ariza	May 17, 2007 - July 26, 2007	Interim
31		Rodrigo Canosa	July 26, 2007 - December 21, 2007	Interim - Removed on charges of corruption
32		Clara Inés Collazos	December 21, 2007 - January 1, 2008	Interim
33		Cristian Moreno Panezo	January 1, 2008 - December 31, 2011	
34		Luis Alberto Monsalvo Gnecco	January 1, 2012 – December 31, 2015	
35		Francisco Ovalle Angarita	January 1, 2016 – December 31, 2019	
36		Luis Alberto Monsalvo Gnecco	January 1, 2020 – December 31, 2023	
37		Elvia Milena Sanjuan Dávila	January 1, 2024 –	

== See also ==
- List of mayors of Valledupar
- List of Colombian department governors
