= Manuel Germán Cuello =

Colombian politician

5th Governor of the Department of Cesar
- In office 19 June 1971 – 13 August 1974
- President: Misael Pastrana Borrero
- Preceded by: José Antonio Murgas
- Succeeded by: Luis Roberto García Díaz-Granados

Mayor of Valledupar
- In office 16 December 1967 – 21 September 1968
- Preceded by: Jose Guillermo Castro Castro
- Succeeded by: Jaime Calderon Bruges

Personal details
- Party: Conservative

Manuel Germán Cuello was a Colombian politician, Mayor of Valledupar in 1967 and Governor of the Department of Cesar by appointment under the presidency of Misael Pastrana between June 19, 1971 and August 13, 1974. Cuello was member of the Colombian Conservative Party.

== Governor of Department of Cesar (1971–1974) ==
=== Cabinet ===
- Secretary of Government: Efrain Quintero Araujo
- Secretary of Development: Cerveleon Padilla
- Secretary of Finances: Parmenides Salazar
- Secretary of Education: Jaime Araujo Noguera
- Chief of Planning: Francisco Ramos Pereira
- Chief of Judicial Bureau: Jorge Enrique Restrepo
- Private Secretary: Marcos J. Orozco
