= Colombian parapolitics scandal =

2006 political scandal on paramilitary collusion

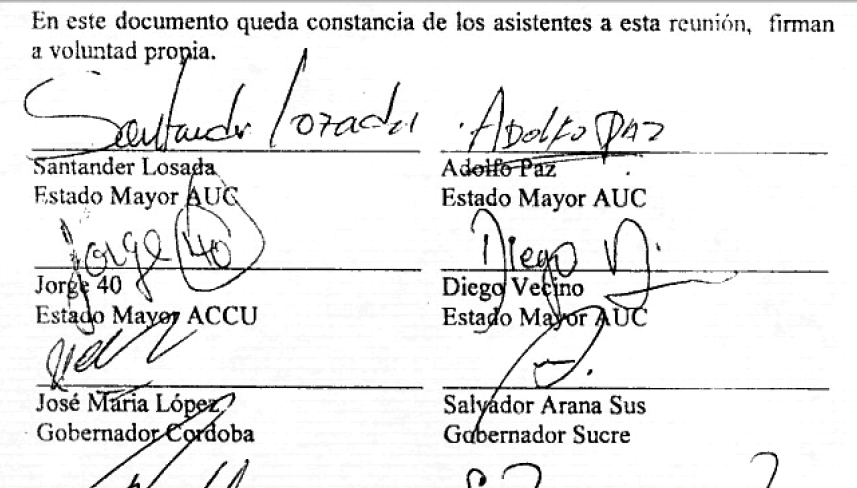
The signatures of paramilitary leaders and two politicians on the Pact of Ralito, a document which agreed to seek a "re-foundation" of Colombia.

The Colombian parapolitics scandal (known as parapolítica in Spanish, a portmonteau of paramilitar and política) refers to the Colombian congressional scandal in which several congressmen and other politicians have been indicted for colluding with the United Self-Defense Forces of Colombia (AUC), a paramilitary group which is responsible for killing thousands of Colombian civilians. The scandal broke in 2006 and by April 17, 2012, 139 members of Congress were under investigation.

Five governors and 32 lawmakers, including Mario Uribe Escobar, cousin of President Álvaro Uribe and former President of Congress, were convicted.

== Background ==
Relations between politicians and government officials, security forces, high profile members of other sectors of society, and paramilitary groups have developed for years, resulting in the latter's infiltration of Colombian politics and government.

According to the newspaper El Tiempo, one of the paramilitary leaders involved, Rodrigo Tovar Pupo, sought to achieve total power in the Atlantic Coast and eventually over Colombia. To achieve this, he and other paramilitary leaders contacted politicians both before, during and after the AUC demobilizations.

In 2001, some 32 people, including members of congress, politicians, paramilitary leaders and others, met at Santa Fe de Ralito in order to sign a secret document known as the Pact of Paramillo Knot or as the "Pact of Ralito". The text of the document called for "refounding the country", signing a new social contract and maintaining national independence, among other statements. When the document's existence was revealed in late 2006, participants such as former congresswoman Elenora Pineda have argued that the document sought to be a contribution to the search of peace in Colombia. Opposition senator Juan Manuel López Cabrales, who also signed the document, argued that he did so in ignorance and under pressure.

After the demobilizations had concluded and the scandal broke, several arrests have been made, most recently on February 15, 2007. Senator Álvaro Araújo Castro, brother of former foreign minister María Consuelo Araújo, was among five congressmen arrested on that day. Also arrested were Mauricio Pimiento, Dieb Maloof, Alfonso Campo Escobar, and Luis Eduardo Vives. His arrest lead to her resignation four days later.

A Supreme Court of Justice investigation into ties between paramilitary groups and congress has been based largely on files discovered on a laptop computer belonging to the organization of former paramilitary leader Rodrigo Tovar Pupo, aka Jorge 40.

== Political involvement ==
The so-called "para-political scandal" was set in motion in June 2005 after Clara López Obregón, a member of the opposition Alternative Democratic Pole party, formally denounced before the Colombian Supreme Court the existence of links between paramilitaries and some congressmen. Previously, paramilitary leader Salvatore Mancuso had said during an interview that some 35% of the elected Congress in 2002 were friendly towards their group.

The confiscation of a laptop computer belonging to the organization of paramilitary leader Jorge 40 gave increased momentum to the scandal. It contained numerous files that mentioned or implicated politicians and members of the security forces that collaborated with his paramilitary force.

== First arrests ==
On November 9, 2006, the Supreme Court ordered the detention of three implicated congressmen.

=== Álvaro García ===
Congressman Álvaro García was accused based on charges of conspiracy to commit aggravated delinquency, aggravated homicide, and embezzlement. García was accused by the Supreme Court for organizing, promoting, arming and financing illegal paramilitary groups in the Sucre Department since 1997, for participating in the Macayepo massacre in the year 2000, in which 20 peasants were massacred, for the assassination of Georgina Narváez Wilchez on November 19, 1997 and the appropriation of public funds to finance paramilitary groups.

=== Jairo Merlano ===
Congressman Jairo Merlano was accused by the Supreme Court and six witnesses of being a formal member of one of the AUC paramilitary groups led by men known by the aliases of "Diego Vecino" (Edward Cobo) and "Cadena" (Rodrigo Mercado Pelufo) among others.

=== Erick Morris ===
Congressman Erick Morris was accused by one witness of having ties to paramilitary groups. Congressman Álvaro García was one of his political mentors.

== The Araújos ==
=== María Consuelo Araújo ===
On November 15, 2006 the then Minister of Foreign Relations, María Consuelo Araújo, met with the Attorney General and her brother, Senator Álvaro Araújo Castro to inquire about the existence of any investigations against her family. Two days later her brother Álvaro was identified as part of the investigation. On November 22, minister Araújo publicly announced that the meeting had taken place.

During a debate in the Senate on November 29, 2006, senate members of the Alternative Democratic Pole (PDA) headed by Jorge Enrique Robledo and members of the Liberal Party headed by Cecilia López Montaño asked for the Minister's resignation due to her brother's ties to the paramilitaries. Most claimed that they had no personal complaints against her, but that she should not remain in her position.

As late as February 18, she refused calls for her to step down and received a statement of support from President Álvaro Uribe, who had previously rejected her resignation. However, after her brother's arrest, her second resignation was accepted by the president on February 19, 2007. Uribe selected former Development Minister Fernando Araújo Perdomo as her replacement, just weeks after his escape from six years as a FARC hostage.

=== Álvaro Araújo ===
On November 21, 2006 members of the pro-Uribe caucus met in the Palacio de Nariño to discuss the Supreme Court decision on the three jailed congressmen. In that meeting Senator Álvaro Araújo Castro mentioned;

If they come for me, it means that they are also coming for the minister (his sister), the Inspector General (Edgardo Maya Villazon) and the President (Uribe).

When knowledge of this remark was leaked to the press, Araújo explained that he was talking about the possible political toll of the scandal and not about judicial responsibilities. After this controversial comment, Araújo temporarily resigned from his party, Alas-Team Colombia, on November 29, 2006. He was called to testify to the Supreme Court.

On February 15, 2007 he was arrested by an order from the Supreme Court, which found enough evidence to continue investigating him for his alleged ties to paramilitary groups and for the crimes of kidnapping with extortion.

=== Hernando Molina Araújo ===
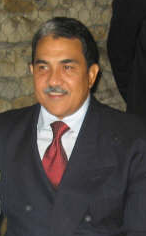
Hernando Molina Araújo, governor of Cesar Department.

The governor of Cesar Department, Hernando Molina Araújo, is accused of handling the money of the paramilitary leader "Jorge 40" during his time as diplomat in Guatemala and co-authoring a massacre.

During the elections of 2003 Molina Araújo was accused of benefiting from the paramilitary decision to support his candidacy over the two other contestants Cristian Moreno Panezo and Abraham Romero who were threatened and forced to resign by the paramilitaries.

== DAS scandal ==
On November 21, 2006, Rafael García Torres, the former Information Technologies Chief of the Administrative Department of Security (DAS) (Departamento Administrativo de Seguridad) was questioned by the Supreme Court after being arrested and charged with taking bribes from paramilitaries and narcotraffickers in exchange for erasing or altering their judicial history from the state intelligence database. García claimed to have knowledge of Jorge 40's plans to corrupt congressmen and install those friendly to his causes.

García had already contended that former chief of DAS Jorge Noguera maintained a close relationship with Jorge 40 and that they met several times to talk about local politics, including support for candidates in the 2003] municipal, gubernatorial and presidential elections, among them the Magdalena Department governor Trino Luna and in the Cesar Department with Hernando Molina Araújo, among others.

President Uribe publicly asked Noguera to appear before the Attorney General's office, but Noguera refused alleging economic and security reasons. Noguera was then acting consul-general in Milan, Italy. He later resigned, returned to the country and appeared before judicial authorities. On February 22, 2007 Noguera was arrested, accused of having ties to paramilitaries.

On June 11, 2008, the Colombian Supreme Court ordered the immediate release of Jorge Noguera. According to the José Alvear Restrepo Lawyers' Collective, Noguera was only released due to procedural defects; however the charges against him -conspiracy to commit a crime, misuse of authority through an arbitrary and unjust act, and improper use of classified or secret information- may still be prosecuted.

== Judicial branch scandal ==
The former president of the Superior Council of Judicature, José Alfredo Escobar Araújo acknowledged that he had a friendship with Italian mobster Giorgio Sale, but denied knowledge of Sale's activities as narcotrafficker. Sale has been associated with paramilitary leader Salvatore Mancuso, himself accused of money laundering, and the Italian mafia group known as 'Ndrangheta.

On November 28, 2006 Escobar Araújo said that he would accept any decision and obey any orders from the Magistrates of the Penal Chamber of Judicature regarding his connection to Sale.

Escobar Araújo's wife, Ana Margarita Fernández, was an official in the Inspector General's office. Escobar resigned the presidency of the Superior Council on November 30 but continued as a magistrate of that body.

== President Álvaro Uribe ==
On November 15, 2006 former president and leader of the opposing Liberal Party, César Gaviria, made a call to support the Supreme Court on the situation and uncover the truth behind the paramilitary-politicians links. He alleged that problems were not only in congress, but also in other sectors of Colombian society. He further alleged that other elected officials indirectly benefited from the paramilitary pressure over voters.

The President [Uribe] had a passive attitude throughout the campaign in relation to these subjects and I would say that he has been a little too passive all the time, but he is still on time to assume a more decisive position to confront these problems.

— Cesar Gaviria

Two days later on November 17 in a speech directed to the Supreme Court, president Uribe reacted to the Court's decision to indict any politician linked to paramilitaries and said that "criminal responsibilities are individual" and that "the truth that was surfacing was a result of his democratic security plan and the demobilization process of the paramilitary groups". He also mentioned that "the nation needed to know the links between politicians and the guerrilla groups" and that "the judicial and political search for truth for past and present events done by guerrillas and paramilitaries should be supported"

On November 29 prior to a debate in Congress, President Uribe reasserted that penal responsibility was individual and that it was necessary to investigate politicians with ties to guerrillas. He also commented that the suspect congressmen were being accused for acts perpetrated before he assumed the presidency in 2002 as a way of distancing himself from the growing scandal. On the same day, the former Interior Minister during President Samper's administration and prominent Liberal Party leader, Horacio Serpa, called for the Chamber of Representative's Commission of Accusations to investigate President Uribe's possible links to paramilitaries.

On April 23, 2008 President Uribe revealed that a former paramilitary fighter had accused him of helping to plan a 1997 massacre, a charge which he said was under official investigation. Uribe described the accuser as a "disgruntled convict with an axe to grind", denied the charges and said there was proof of his innocence. The Colombian newsweekly Revista Semana reported that the paramilitary in question, Francisco Enrique Villalba Hernández, had not mentioned Uribe during previous declarations made more than five years ago, when he was sentenced for his own role in the massacre. The magazine also listed a number of possible inconsistencies in his most recent testimony, including the alleged presence of General Hernando Manosalva, who had died months before the date of the meeting where the massacre was planned.

His cousin and former Colombian senator, Mario Uribe, was arrested under suspicion of ties to the right-wing paramilitary groups.

== Others implicated ==
=== Salvador Arana ===
Former governor of the Sucre Department and former ambassador to Chile, Salvador Arana was accused of homicide. The Attorney General's Office accused him of being the mastermind behind the assassination of Eduardo Díaz, mayor of El Roble. Díaz had publicly warned that he had been threatened by the paramilitaries. Arana was formally accused by a demobilized paramilitary member called Jairo Castillo, also known as "Pitirry".

=== Nancy Patricia Gutiérrez ===
Colombia’s Supreme Court announced on April 18, 2008 they are investigating President of Congress Nancy Patricia Gutiérrez for having ties with paramilitary groups. According to Colombian newspaper El Tiempo the Supreme court started the investigation after statements made by former congresswoman Rocío Arias in Cambio. In an interview, the former congresswoman, who was also arrested for being involved in parapolitics, said that Gutiérrez was supported by paramilitary leader John Fredy ‘The Bird’ Gallo. Gallo is held responsible for the murder of dozens in the Department of Cundinamarca.

=== Mario Uribe Escobar ===
Mario Uribe Escobar, cousin of President Álvaro Uribe and former President of Congress sought political asylum at the Costa Rican embassy on April 22, 2008, after a prosecution arrest warrant was made public. According to prosecutors, witnesses have claimed that the former President of Congress met with paramilitary leaders in 1998 to jump start a strategy to seize farms in several departments. Former paramilitary boss Salvatore Mancuso had previously told the Prosecution he had met with Uribe Escobar in 2002, to ensure the Senator would win the elections in the Córdoba Department. Mancuso later retracted this statement. According to his lawyer, Uribe went to the Costa Rican embassy in Bogotá on the grounds that he didn't have adequate procedural guarantees in Colombia.

Mario Uribe was temporarily released from prison 20 August 2008. He was released from prison on November 15, 2012. He spent 54 months in jail.

== Response and public discourse ==
In February 2007, Colombian Senator Jorge Enrique Robledo suggested another term, "parauribismo", indicating that the scandal was mainly affecting officials or political allies of President Álvaro Uribe's administration.

=== Political reforms ===
On April 9, 2008 the Álvaro Uribe Administration supported a political reform law, presented by some congressmen, to tackle the growing scandal of parapolitics in the Colombian Senate. By then 51 Congressmen were suspected of parapolitics. 29 of them were in jail awaiting trial. The government proposed the "Empty Chair" solution; Senators that are suspended or jailed for alleged ties with illegal armed groups may not be replaced by their political parties. This way the parties would be forced to keep their fraction "clean". A majority of the Colombian House of Representatives agreed with the law. The biggest opposition party Polo Democrático Alternativo, also one of the few parties not affected by the scandal, voted against the law, saying the current legislative chambers have no credibility to solve the problem. On April 16, 2008, one day after the vote in the House, Senator Carlos Garcia, President of the Partido de la U, began to be officially investigated under suspicion of paramilitary ties. Garcia resigned from his Partido de la U position, but said he would not quit Congress.

== See also ==
- List of people called by the Colombian Supreme court in the parapolitics scandal
- Right-wing paramilitarism in Colombia
- Corruption in Colombia
