= Mauricio Pimiento =

Colombian politician

Mauricio Pimiento Barrera

Senator of Colombia
- In office 20 July 2002 – 16 February 2007

25th Governor of Cesar
- In office 1 January 1995 – 1 January 1998
- Preceded by: Lucas Segundo Gnecco Cerchar
- Succeeded by: Lucas Segundo Gnecco Cerchar

Personal details
- Born: March 17, 1961 (age 65) Bucaramanga, Santander, Colombia
- Party: Social National Unity
- Spouse(s): Janis Martinez; Florina Lemeitre; Adela Maestre Cuello
- Children: José Martín Pimiento Martinez; María Cristina Pimiento Martinez
- Education: Free University of Colombia; American University
- Profession: Lawyer

Mauricio Pimiento Barrera (born March 17, 1961) is a Colombian politician, former Senator of Colombia. Pimiento was arrested on February 16, 2007, after being involved in the Para-political scandal. On May 16, 2008, Colombian justice condemned Pimiento to 7 years in prison for conspiring with a terrorist group and electoral fraud.

== Early life ==
Pimiento studied law and graduated from the Free University of Colombia and has a master in Law from the American University in the United States.

== Career ==
Pimiento has been Secretary General and Sub-Director of the National Institute of Social Security and General Director of the Co-Financing Fund for the Rural Sector.

With the political support of the Araujo family in Valledupar he became Governor of the Cesar Department between 1995 and 1997. He was later elected as Senator of Colombia, participating in the first senate committee.

Pimiento was arrested February 16, 2007 after being involved in the Para-political scandal.
