= Andrés Julián Rendón =

Colombian politician (born 1978)

Andrés Julián Rendón Cardona
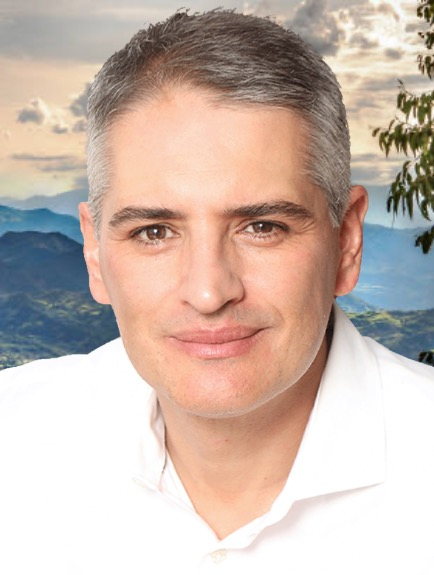
- 2023
- Incumbent
- Assumed office 1 January 2024
- Preceded by: Aníbal Gaviria

Mayor of Rionegro
- In office 1 January 2016 – 31 December 2020
- Preceded by: Hernán Ospina
- Succeeded by: Rodrigo Hernández

Councilor of Rionegro
- In office 1 January 2001 – 17 October 2002

Personal details
- Born: Andrés Julián Rendón Cardona; 9 January 1978 (age 48) Rionegro, Antioquia, Colombia
- Party: Centro Democrático - 2008
- Spouse: Susana Ochoa Henao (m. 2012)
- Children: Emiliana Rendón García Abigail Rendón Ochoa Salvador Rendón Ochoa
- Education: Economics, EAFIT University (1996–2001) Specialization in economic regulation, EAFIT University (2004–2005) Master's degree in economics, University of the Andes (2005–2007) Master's degree in public administration, American University (2012–2014)
- Occupation: Economist, Public Administrator, University Lecturer, Politician

Andrés Julián Rendón Cardona Andrés Julián Rendón Cardona (born 9 January 1978) is a Colombian economist, public administrator and politician from Rionegro, Antioquia. He has been Governor of Antioquia since 1 January 2024, for the 2024–2027 term.

He previously served as a member of the Rionegro Municipal Council, as Secretary of Government of Antioquia, and as Mayor of Rionegro from 2016 to 2019.

== Biography ==
Rendón completed his secondary education at the Seminario Corazonista, a private school in Marinilla, Antioquia. He then studied English as a second language at Robron High School in Canada, where he took part in a student exchange. He graduated in economics from EAFIT University and completed a specialization in economic regulation at the same university. He holds a master's degree in economics from the University of the Andes and, in the United States, earned a master's degree in public administration from American University.

He has held various positions during his political career. He entered public life when he was elected to the Rionegro Municipal Council, where he served for just under a year (2001–2002), resigning in October 2002 to take up a position as a macroeconomic analyst at Suvalor, a company based in Medellín. He later served as an adviser to Colombia's Ministry of Finance and Public Credit under minister Roberto Junguito Bonnet, during the government of Álvaro Uribe.He left political life for a time to pursue personal aspirations in the public sector, and returned shortly afterwards as Secretary of Government of Antioquia during Luis Alfredo Ramos's term as governor of the department. On 25 October 2015 he was elected mayor of Rionegro, in his third candidacy in the municipality, with almost 63% of the vote. He became Governor of Antioquia after defeating former governor Luis Pérez Gutiérrez in the 2023 election.

== Political career ==
=== Rionegro municipal councillor ===
Rendón was elected to the council of the municipality of Rionegro, Antioquia, on Sunday 29 October 2000 with a total of 1,440 votes, the second-highest vote in the municipality, behind his fellow Liberal Party member Humberto de Jesús Quintero.

He left the post on 17 October 2002 after receiving a job offer, which would allow him to continue his studies and academic experience, to work as a macroeconomic analyst at Suvalor, a company based in Medellín.

=== Secretary of Government of Antioquia ===
Luis Alfredo Ramos chose Rendón as part of his cabinet for the 2008–2012 term, and Rendón held the position until the end of that term. During this time he served as acting governor (gobernador encargado) on 11 occasions, when the incumbent was absent for various reasons.

According to EAFIT University, Rendón made progress in security and in the control of illicit activities in the department: the formation of 41 new police commands, a 53% reduction in the area under coca cultivation, a 30% reduction in the homicide rate and in illegal armed groups, and the creation of 28 justice houses (casas de justicia). He turned the administrative unit into a support for the department's public security forces and security agencies.

He directed the coordination of actions aimed at the demobilization of guerrillas and the dismantling of illegal structures in the region. He supervised the team in the case of the voluntary surrender of Alberto de Jesús Morales Morales, alias El Pájaro, a leader of the 36th Front of the FARC.

For most of his tenure, Rendón worked hand in hand with the intelligence work of several bodies, including the Administrative Department of Security, the Army's Seventh Division, the Fourteenth Brigade and the Air Force. During his tenure, security improved in Northeast Antioquia, especially in Anorí, and peasant farmers were freed from the threat posed by various armed structures engaged in illicit activities such as illegal mining and drug trafficking.

=== Mayor of Rionegro ===
Rendón ran unsuccessfully in two consecutive elections for mayor of Rionegro. In 2003 he stood as the candidate of Cambio Radical, obtaining 11,359 votes and finishing second. Four years later, in the 2007 election, he ran again for the same party, improving his result to 14,368 votes but again finishing second. Despite these defeats, he was elected mayor of his municipality in 2015.

Rendón was elected mayor on 25 October 2015 with 62.51% of the vote. His candidacy was supported by various sectors and political parties in a coalition called Unidos por Rionegro. He received the main endorsement (aval) of his party, the Centro Democrático, and the support of the Partido Conservador Colombiano, Opción Ciudadana and the Indigenous Authorities of Colombia (AICO).

As mayor-elect, Rendón appointed his cabinet for his term, made up of a total of eight men and four women in the various secretariats:

Municipal cabinet of Mayor Andrés Julián Rendón, 2016–2020 term

Officeholder	Secretariat
Mauricio de Jesús Rendón González	Private Secretariat
Martha Patricia Correa Taborda	Secretariat of Justice
Hugo Parra Galeano	Secretariat of Government
Rodrigo Hernández Alzate	Secretariat of Finance
Adrián Castro Alzate	Secretariat of Security
Yised Baena Aristizábal	Secretariat of Education
Guillermo León Gómez Rendón	Secretariat of Planning
Eliana María Ceballos Zuluaga	Administrative Secretariat
Diana María Mejía Valencia	Secretariat of Social Health
Hernán Darío Álvarez Suárez	Secretariat of Infrastructure
Óscar Rodrigo Rendón Serna	Secretariat of Entrepreneurship
Jorge Humberto Rivas Urrea	Secretariat of the Environment

Rendón's government plan envisaged an administration focused on sustainable development and the improvement of public services in the municipality. During his term, Empresas Públicas de Rionegro (EP Rio) was separated from the municipality and transferred to Empresas Públicas de Medellín (EPM) as a strategic measure. EPM was allowed to modernize the water networks, investing COP 300 billion (300,000 million pesos) without affecting user tariffs.

The Gilberto Mejía Mejía hospital was liquidated and its operations were transferred to the San Juan de Dios hospital, which saw improvements in its operations and in its health and budgetary results.

By the end of his term, Rionegro had become the only non-capital city in Colombia to take part in the sustainable cities programme of the Inter-American Development Bank. The tender for the construction of a light rail line was awarded. More than 1,500 new homes and 2,000 home improvements were delivered, and progress was made on a 29.5 km road plan, under way and financed with COP 450 billion (450,000 million pesos).

Rendón also promoted improvements in other sectors: greater coverage of early childhood services, larger food rations in schools, the expansion of full-day schools, scholarships for young people at universities in Antioquia through the BecaSaber programme, and the inclusion of older people in the municipality's old-age protection network.

Security efforts, including investment, crime-specific management units (gerencias por delitos) and citizen security fronts, helped to promote self-care and to change the perception of security in Rionegro, as reflected in the slogan #RionegroSeTransforma used in the municipality.

=== Governor of Antioquia ===
==== Election ====
Rendón was elected governor on 29 October 2023 with 37.31% of the vote. His candidacy was supported by various sectors and political parties in a coalition called Por Antioquia Firme.^{]} He received the main endorsement of his party, the Centro Democrático, and the support of Creemos, MIRA, the Partido Liberal, the significant group of citizens Una AntioquiaViva (led by Eugenio Prieto), the Partido de la U, the Movimiento Salvación Nacional and the Autoridades Indígenas de Colombia.

Rendón did not win in most of the municipalities of Antioquia. Former governor Luis Pérez won instead, especially in the Urabá and Bajo Cauca regions, which had been considered strategic for Rendón's campaign. Luis Fernando Begué, the campaign's financial manager, said that the strategy in those areas had been to even out the contest. Rendón secured his victory above all in Medellín, where he beat Luis Pérez by a wide margin of votes. He also won in other strategic municipalities such as Bello, La Estrella, Itagüí and Sabaneta.

==== Departmental cabinet ====
Rendón's departmental cabinet, in office since he became governor on 1 January 2024, was formed with the aim of balancing gender representation and political diversity, with a significant number of women and men in the various secretariats and key departments. During his term, adjustments were made in several areas of the cabinet in response to administrative needs and political changes. For the most part, the cabinet has included a strong presence of traditional parties and of other parties with regional relevance.

Departmental cabinet of Governor Andrés Julián Rendón
Secretaría	Titular	Partido	Período
Secretaría General	Martha Patricia Correa Taborda	Partido Conservador	01/01/2024 - 04/09/2026
Secretaría General	Cristel Guisel Jaramillo Álvarez	Partido Conservador	04/09/2026 - En el cargo
Secretaría de Gobierno	Lina Marcela Cuartas Ospina	Independiente	01/01/2024 - 18/09/2024
Secretaría de Gobierno	María Patricia Giraldo Ramírez	Partido Conservador	19/09/2024 - 31/12/2024
Secretaría de Gobierno	Luis Fernando Begué Trujillo	Centro Democrático	31/12/2024 - 04/08/2026
Secretaría de Gobierno	María Patricia Giraldo Ramírez	Partido Conservador	04/08/2026 - En el cargo
Secretaría de Hacienda	Eugenio Prieto Soto	Partido Liberal	01/01/2024 - 25/07/2024
Secretaría de Hacienda	Santiago Valencia González	Centro Democrático	25/07/2024 - 31/12/2024
Secretaría de Hacienda	Ofelia Elcy Velásquez Hernández	Centro Democrático	01/01/2025 - En el cargo
Secretaría de Seguridad, Justicia y Paz	Luis Eduardo Martínez Guzmán	Independiente	01/01/2024 - En el cargo
Secretaría de Desarrollo Económico	Santiago Valencia González	Centro Democrático	01/01/2024 - 25/07/2024
Secretaría de Desarrollo Económico	Manuel Alejandro Naranjo Giraldo	Independiente	25/07/2024 - 24/08/2026
Secretaría de Desarrollo Económico	Camilo Tamayo Calle	Independiente	24/08/2026 - En el cargo
Secretaría de Salud e Inclusión Social	Martha Cecilia Ramírez Orrego	Partido Conservador	01/01/2024 - 04/03/2026
Secretaría de Salud e Inclusión Social	Diego Alejandro Villa Valderrama	Centro Democrático	16/03/2026 - 06/05/2026
Secretaría de Salud e Inclusión Social	Alma Johana Solano Sanchez	Independiente	06/05/2026 - En el cargo
Secretaría de Talento Humano y Servicios Administrativos	Martha Patricia Correa Taborda	Partido Conservador	01/01/2024 - 25/07/2024
Secretaría de Talento Humano y Servicios Administrativos	Rosa María Acevedo Jaramillo	Centro Democrático	25/07/2024 - En el cargo
Secretaría de Educación	Mauricio Alviar Ramírez	Partido Creemos	01/01/2024 - 01/11/2025
Secretaría de Educación	Mónica Ospina Londoño	Centro Democrático	11/12/2025 - En el cargo
Secretaría de Ambiente	Jimmy Collazos Franco	Partido Liberal	01/01/2024 - 01/04/2025
Secretaría de Ambiente	Beatriz Elena Pabón Acevedo	Partido Liberal	01/04/2025 - En el cargo
Secretaría de Infraestructura Física	Luis Horacio Gallon Arango	Partido Conservador	01/01/2024 - 15/07/2026
Secretaría de Infraestructura Física	Sebastián Castaño Gómez	Independiente	16/07/2026 - En el cargo
Secretaría de Mujeres	María del Pilar Solano Sierra	Partido Creemos	01/01/2024 - 15/08/2024
Secretaría de Mujeres	Carolina Lopera Tobón	Partido Creemos	15/08/2024 - En el cargo
Secretaría de Juventudes	Roberto José Rave Ríos	Centro Democrático	01/01/2024 - 29/07/2024
Secretaría de Juventudes	Juan Felipe Marín Muñoz	Centro Democrático	30/07/2024 - 31/12/2024
Secretaría de Juventudes	Katherine Zapata Orrego	Centro Democrático	01/01/2025 - 18/07/2025
Secretaría de Juventudes	Daniel Alberto Arbeláez Echeverri	Partido Liberal	18/07/2025 - En el cargo
Dependencias	Titular	Partido	Período
Departamento Administrativo de Planeación	Manuel Alejandro Naranjo Giraldo	Partido Creemos	01/01/2024 - 25/07/2024
Departamento Administrativo de Planeación	Eugenio Prieto Soto	Partido Liberal	25/07/2024 - 12/07/2026
Departamento Administrativo de Planeación	Luis Fernando Agudelo Henao	Independiente	16/07/2026 - En el cargo
Departamento Administrativo de Gestión del Riesgo	Octavio Duque Jiménez	Partido de la U	01/01/2024 - 02/07/2024
Departamento Administrativo de Gestión del Riesgo	Carlos Andrés Ríos Puerta	Centro Democrático	02/07/2024 - 31/10/2025
Departamento Administrativo de Gestión del Riesgo	Óscar Daniel Galeano Tamayo	Centro Democrático	01/11/2025 - 03/03/2026
Departamento Administrativo de Gestión del Riesgo	Vanessa Paredes Zúñiga	Independiente	03/03/2026 - En el cargo
Departamento del Instituto Departamental de Deportes	Luis Fernando Begué Trujillo	Centro Democrático	01/01/2024 - 28/07/2024
Departamento del Instituto Departamental de Deportes	Ferney Cardona Echeverri	Partido de la U	29/07/2024 - 09/08/2024
Departamento del Instituto Departamental de Deportes	Luis Giovany Arias Tobón	Centro Democrático	09/08/2024 - 22/11/2025
Departamento del Instituto Departamental de Deportes	Santiago Valencia González	Centro Democrático	05/01/2026 - En el cargo
Departamento de Auditoría Interna	Liliana Andrea López Noreña	Partido de la U	01/01/2024 - En el cargo
Departamento de Fábrica de Licores de Antioquia	Esteban Ramos Maya	Centro Democrático	01/01/2024 - 16/07/2026
Departamento de Fábrica de Licores de Antioquia	Luis Fernando Begué Trujillo	Centro Democrático	16/07/2026 - En el cargo
Departamento de Promotoría del Ferrocarril	Marcela Holguín Moreno	Centro Democrático	01/01/2024 - En el cargo
Departamento del Instituto para el Desarrollo	Catalina Gómez Toro	Independiente	01/01/2024 - En el cargo
