= Alfonso López Michelsen =

President of Colombia from 1974 to 1978

His Excellency Alfonso López Michelsen
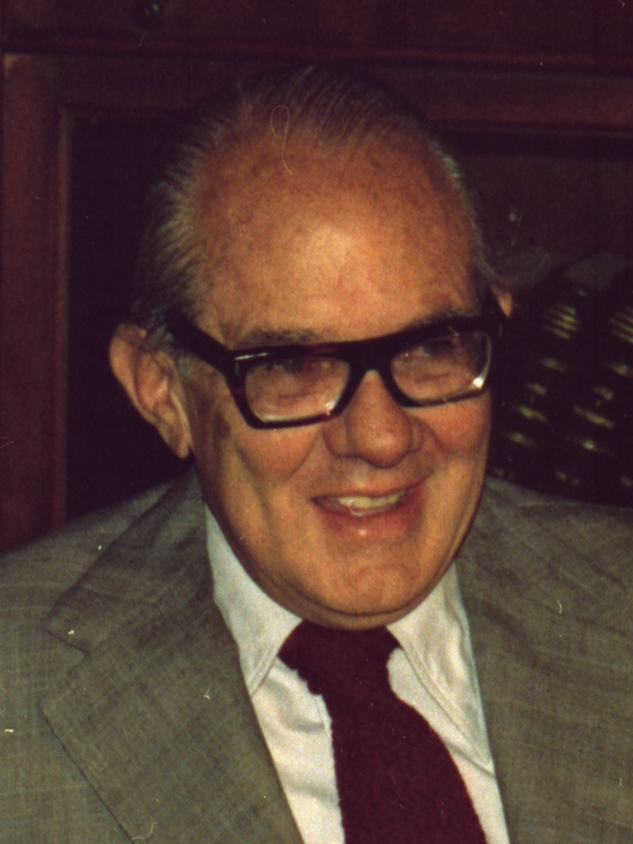
- López in 1977

25th President of Colombia
- In office 7 August 1974 – 7 August 1978
- Preceded by: Misael Pastrana Borrero
- Succeeded by: Julio César Turbay Ayala

Minister of Foreign Affairs
- In office 14 August 1968 – 7 August 1970
- President: Carlos Lleras Restrepo
- Preceded by: Germán Zea Hernández
- Succeeded by: Alfredo Vázquez Carrizosa

1st Governor of Cesar
- In office 21 December 1967 – 14 August 1968
- Preceded by: Position established
- Succeeded by: Luis Roberto García

Personal details
- Born: 30 June 1913 Bogotá, D.C., Colombia
- Died: 11 July 2007 (aged 94) Bogotá, D.C., Colombia
- Resting place: Central Cemetery of Bogotá
- Party: Liberal
- Spouse: Cecilia Caballero Blanco (m. 1938)
- Children: Alfonso López Caballero; Juan Manuel López Caballero; Felipe López Caballero
- Parent(s): Alfonso López Pumarejo; María Michelsen Lombana
- Education: Our Lady of the Rosary University (JD, 1937)
- Profession: Lawyer

Alfonso López Michelsen (30 June 1913 – 11 July 2007) was a Colombian politician and lawyer who served as the 25th President of Colombia from 1974 to 1978. He was nicknamed "El Pollo" (The Chicken), a popular Colombian idiom for people with precocious careers.

== Early years ==
López was the son of former two-time president of Colombia, Alfonso López Pumarejo and his first wife María Michelsen Lombana, who was of Danish descent. He was born and raised in Bogotá. He studied at the Gimnasio Moderno School and later in other cities: Paris, Brussels, London and Santiago de Chile. He graduated with a degree in law from the Universidad del Rosario.

During his father's presidency, López maintained a low profile in politics and instead focused on becoming a university professor at the Universidad del Rosario.

In 1938, López married Cecilia Caballero Blanco in Bogotá and they had three sons. They moved to the outskirts of Bogotá in a hacienda in the then municipality of Engativá, Cundinamarca Department (nowadays a Locality of Bogotá). Settled in this town, López had his first experience of politics becoming a town councilman. During this time, his fellow councilmen included two other politicians who went on to become key political players in the country, Álvaro Gómez Hurtado and future president Julio César Turbay Ayala.

== Political career ==
In 1959, a group of his former college students founded the Liberal Revolutionary Movement (MRL) as a reaction against the pact between the Liberal Party and the Conservative Party to create the National Front, in which the two parties took turns to govern. López Michelsen was then offered the leadership of the newly created MRL and he accepted, becoming a presidential candidate for the 1962 presidential elections. López lost the election by a large margin to Conservative candidate Guillermo León Valencia.

=== Governor of the Department of Cesar (1967–1968) ===
In 1966, López was elected as a senator and negotiated the return of the MRL to the Liberal Party in 1967. This same year López traveled to the city of Valledupar after being appointed by President Carlos Lleras Restrepo as the first governor of Cesar Department, a newly created province in the northern Caribbean Region of Colombia. López was able to trace his grandmothers' family ancestors "the Pumarejos," back to this town. During those years, he was also instrumental in the creation of the Vallenato Legend Festival (nowadays, one of the most important cultural events in Colombia) along with vallenato composer Rafael Escalona and journalist Consuelo Araújo. He served as governor of Cesar from 21 December 1967, until 14 August 1968.

==== Cabinet ====
- Secretary of Government: Luis Roberto García
- Secretary of Development: Alvaro Pupo Pupo
- Administrative Office Chief: Alvaro Araujo Noguera
- Chief of Planning: Jorge Chaild Velez
- Chief of Education: Cesar Fernandez Dager
- Chief of Agricultural Sector: Hernan Osorio
- Chief of Public Works: Emiro Alfonso Zuleta
- Chief of Budget and Accountability: Teobaldo Manjarrez
- Chief of General Services: Damazo Lora
- Chief of Personnel: Jorge Gomez
- Chief of Judicial Bureau: Uribe Habid Molina
- Administrator of Rents: Diomedes Daza Daza
- Private Secretary: Cesar Escobar Ortega
- Chief of Public Relations: Rafael Escalona

=== Minister of Foreign Affairs ===
A year later, he was appointed Minister of Foreign Affairs until the end of the presidential term of President Carlos Lleras Restrepo in 1970.

=== Presidency (1974–1978) ===
In 1974, López was chosen by the Liberal Party as their candidate for president, after defeating former president Carlos Lleras Restrepo in the party presidential primaries, with the support of former candidate (and presidential successor) Julio César Turbay. He won the general election by a large margin against the Conservative Party candidate Álvaro Gómez Hurtado, and the ANAPO candidate, María Eugenia Rojas. His 2,929,719 votes were the highest ever for any president until that time.

His inaugural presidential speech, delivered on 7 August 1974, is mostly remembered for calling the disputed border area in the Gulf of Venezuela by its native indigenous name, "Gulf of Coquibacoa" given by the Wayuus. In his speech he also promised to reduce the growing gap between farmer and urban populations and to fight poverty, messages that attracted the support of many left-wing political movements.

As a president, López declared economic emergency in order to correct the fiscal deficit, which allowed him to implement a number of regulatory measures to control spending, and to reduce subsidies and programs like the tax credit certificate (CAT) which reimbursed partial or total taxes for exporting companies. He also introduced a tax and fiscal reform which increased national saving, and allowed an increase in public investment and exports. Crop production increased 16%, and he also created public offices devoted to the improvement of farming. Under his government, also, power grids were expanded, and infrastructure investment increased. In contrast, inflation reached under his government its highest historical values, at around 32%.

Early support for his policies soon turned to fierce opposition, as many of his campaign promises, in particular those to make deals with unions and in the improvement of potable water access, went unfulfilled, and as subsidies were eliminated and inflation rose. Unions and other leftist activists had been accumulating frustration and resentment for decades after the killing of Jorge Eliécer Gaitán, and the subsequent violence, and the hope for a more open society that came with Lopez's election turned into feelings of betrayal. As a result, and after three years as president the major Colombian Unions got together and managed to propose and organize a massive, general strike. The López administration took a hard approach towards the planned strike, calling it subversive and at some point threatening arrest and forbidding public meetings. This only enraged the participants, and the major unionists were joined by teachers, students, independent workers, housewives, guerrilla leaders, and even members of the opposition conservative party. The organizing committee demanded among other things salary increases, frozen prices for essential goods and public services fees, re-establishment of the right to meet and strike, and a reduction in work hours.

The strike, occurring on 14 September 1977, came to be known as the National Civil Strike, and it attracted such a large number of discontented participants that the organizing committee soon lost control of it. Major roads were blocked all over Bogota, and in many other cities around the country, and very soon many small skirmishes between protesters and riot police started occurring all over. The manifestations and skirmishes soon turned into riots, and protesters started pillaging big stores and vandalizing factories and cars. By 4 pm the major declared curfew which only made protesters more enraged. Hundreds of protesters were wounded, and thousands were arrested and assembled in the city's Soccer stadium and bullfighting arena. Riots and skirmishes continued all night and well into the next day, which devastated the city. About 20 or 30 people died in the middle of it. As a consequence, unions declared victory and the López Michelsen's government had to make concessions. However, the riot made his government adopt a harsher, more repressive stance.

=== Post presidency ===
Upon the end of his term in 1978, he again became the leader of Liberal Party. He ran for president again in 1982, but was defeated by the Conservative Party candidate, Belisario Betancur.

He continued to actively participate in the decision making of the Liberal Party until the early 1990s when he decided to withdraw from political activity. He was a regular columnist for the Colombian newspaper El Tiempo which drew attention to many critical issues. For this reason he was called "el hombre que pone a pensar al pais" (Spanish for "The man who makes the country think").

Lopez Michelsen died in Bogotá on 11 July 2007, after suffering a heart attack.

Political offices
Preceded by Misael Pastrana Borrero	President of Colombia; 1974–1978	Succeeded by Julio César Turbay Ayala
