= List of mayors of Valledupar =

The following is a list of mayors of the city of Valledupar, Colombia. (Spanish: Alcaldes de Valledupar)

Term	Mayor	Notes
c. 1550	Emilio de la Cruz	Valledupar founded in 1550 by Hernando de Santana and accompanied by Juan de Castellanos
	Cristobal de Almonacid	
1576	Lope de Orozco	
1806 - 1813	Marqués de Valde-Hoyos	
1826	José Manuel Martinez	
1906	Moisés Martínez	
1951 - 1954	Tte. Jose Joaquin Diaz Linero	
1955	Jorge Dangond Daza	
1963	Jaime Dangon Ovalle	
1965 - 1966	Jose Joaquin Diaz Linero	
September 13, 1966 - December 16, 1967	Jose Guillermo Castro	
1967	Manuel German Cuello	
September 21, 1968	Jaime Calderon Bruges	
August 22, 1970	Jorge Dangond Daza	
June 19, 1971	Edgardo Pupo Pupo	
August 20, 1974	Miguel Meza Valera	
1975	Jaime Calderon Bruges	
1977	Camilo Lacouture Dangond	
1978	Guillermo Castro Mejia	
1978	Miguel Gnecco Hernandez	
1981	Maria Clara Quintero de Daza	
1982	Alfredo Cuello Davila	
1986	Fausto Cotes Núñez	
July 10, 1990 - May 31, 1992	Aníbal Martínez Zuleta	Former Controller General of Colombia, jailed on January 29, 1985 for corruption. Elected mayor with 29,542 votes
1992 - 1994	Rodolfo Campo Soto	First popularly elected mayor of Valledupar
January 1, 1995 - December 31, 1997	Johnny Perez Oñate	
1998 - 2000	Rodolfo Campo Soto	
January 1, 2001 - December 31, 2004	Elias Ochoa Daza	
January 1, 2005 - December 31, 2007	Ciro Arturo Pupo Castro	Won with 42,889 votes against Jose Calixto Mejia 31,335 votes.
January 1, 2008	Ruben Carvajal	
	Luis Fabian Fernandez	
	Fredy Socarras	
