= Alternative for Social Advance =

Political party in Colombia

Liberal Alternative for Social Advance Alternativa Liberal de Avanzada Social
- Abbreviation: ALAS
- Merged into: Somos Región Colombia (2005)

The Alternative for Social Advance (Alternativa Liberal de Avanzada Social, ALAS) was a political party in Colombia. During the legislative elections on 10 March 2002, the party won parliamentary representation. They received a total of 171,090 votes, or 1.8%, in the 2010 general elections. In 2005, it merged with Team Colombia to form ALAS-Team Colombia, later Somos Región Colombia.

== See also ==
- Somos Región Colombia
