= Hernando Molina Araújo =

Colombian politician

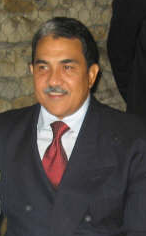

30th Governor of Cesar Department
- In office January 1, 2004 – May 17, 2007
- Preceded by: Rafael Bolaños Guerrero
- Succeeded by: Cristian Hernando Moreno Panezo

Personal details
- Born: August 28, 1961 (age 64) Valledupar, Cesar, Colombia
- Spouse: Katica Carvajal Riveira
- Relations: Consuelo Araújonoguera (mother); Maria Consuelo Araújo (cousin); Álvaro Araújo Castro (cousin)
- Children: Diana Carolina; Hernando Enrique; Andrés David
- Profession: politician

Hernando César Molina Araújo (born August 28, 1961 in Valledupar) is a Colombian politician. Son of Hernando Molina Céspedes and Consuelo Araújo, he studied at the Colegio Nacional Loperena in Valledupar and later studied Law in the Antonio Nariño University, but dropped out. He declares himself a self-taught man. Molina was governor of the Colombian Department of Cesar for the period 2004–2007, a term which he did not complete due to his involvement in the Parapolitica scandal. he was called to testify on May 17, 2007 at the Office of the Attorney General of Colombia.

== Career ==
- Manager of Electrocesar, an energy state-owned company
- Valledupar city councilman
- Municipality of Valledupar Finance Secretary
- Colombian consul in Guatemala, Costa Rica, and Panama
- Temporary Colombian ambassador to Costa Rica
- Vallenato Legend Festival coordinator
- Elected governor of the Cesar Department

=== Governorship ===
In 2003 Molina ran for the Cesar Department governorship without contestants after a highly influential AUC paramilitary leader in the region named Jorge 40 allegedly mounted pressure over the other two candidates to make them renounce their candidacies. These raised questions about Molina and his possible involvement with illegal paramilitary groups.

== See also ==
- Consuelo Araújo
- María Consuelo Araújo
- Cesar Department
