= Andrés Pastrana Arango =

President of Colombia from 1998 to 2002

His Excellency Andrés Pastrana Arango
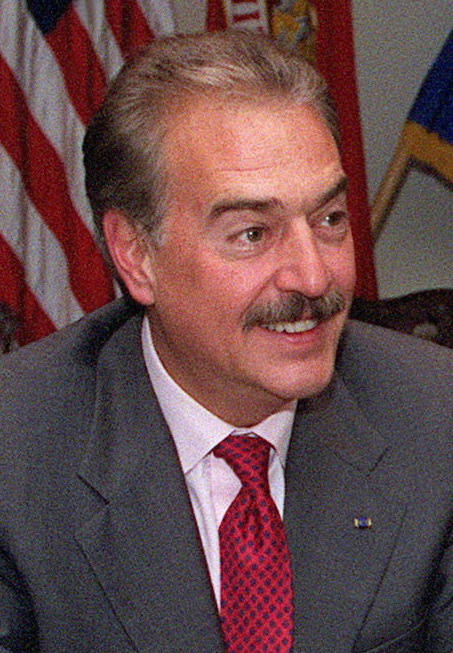
- Pastrana in 2001

31st President of Colombia
- In office 7 August 1998 – 7 August 2002
- Vice President: Gustavo Bell Lemus
- Preceded by: Ernesto Samper
- Succeeded by: Álvaro Uribe

30th Ambassador of Colombia to the United States
- In office 24 October 2005 – 11 July 2006
- President: Álvaro Uribe
- Preceded by: Luis Alberto Moreno
- Succeeded by: Carolina Barco Isakson

18th Secretary General of the Non-Aligned Movement
- In office 7 August 1998 – 2 September 1998
- Preceded by: Ernesto Samper Pizano
- Succeeded by: Nelson Mandela

18th Mayor of Bogotá
- In office 1 January 1988 – 1 January 1990
- Preceded by: Julio César Sánchez
- Succeeded by: Juan Martín Caycedo Ferrer

Personal details
- Born: 17 August 1954 (age 72) Bogotá, D.C., Colombia
- Party: Conservative
- Other political affiliations: Great Alliance for Change
- Spouse: Nohra Puyana Bickenbach (m. 1981)
- Relations: Misael Pastrana Borrero (father); María Cristina Arango Vega (mother)
- Children: Santiago Pastrana Puyana; Laura Pastrana Puyana; Valentina Pastrana Puyana
- Education: Our Lady of the Rosary University (LLB, 1977); Harvard University (WCIA Fellow, 1978)
- Profession: Lawyer

Andrés Pastrana Arango (born 17 August 1954) is a Colombian politician who was President of Colombia from 1998 to 2002, following in the footsteps of his father, Misael Pastrana Borrero, who was president from 1970 to 1974.

== Early years ==
Pastrana was born on 17 August 1954 in Bogotá to Misael Pastrana Borrero, who later served as the 23rd President of Colombia, and María Cristina Arango Vega, the former First Lady of Colombia.

During his father's presidency, he was a high school student at Colegio San Carlos where he served as president of the student council and graduated in 1973. He later acquired a degree in law at the Our Lady of the Rosary University in 1977, and attended Harvard University as a 1978 Weatherhead Center for International Affairs Fellow. He founded the magazine Guión and a programadora known as Datos y Mensajes, whose flagship program was the newscast Noticiero TV Hoy. As a regular news anchor he became a nationally known figure.

In 1982, he formally began his political career by gaining a seat on the local Bogotá council. He also specialized in press articles on the production and trafficking of cocaine for which he gained many journalistic awards. In 1991, he was elected Senator.

== Kidnapping by Medellín Cartel and elected Mayor of Bogotá ==
He was kidnapped on January 18, 1988, in Antioquia by the Medellín Cartel, which was pressuring the Colombian government into preventing the extradition of Pablo Escobar and other drug lords to the United States. He was found by the National Police a week later, and in March, he was elected Mayor of Bogotá, a position that he held until 1990.

== First candidacy for President of Colombia ==
In 1994, he stood for the presidency against the Liberal candidate, Ernesto Samper, and lost by only 2% in the second round. Pastrana immediately accused Samper of using drug money to finance his campaign and provided audio recordings to the authorities that subsequently attracted much media attention and eventually led to a scandal known as 8.000 Process (Proceso 8.000).

While the accusation underwent a parliamentary investigation, Pastrana retired into his private life. In 1998, Pastrana announced his intention to run for president. This time, he won that year's presidential election.

Former paramilitary Salvatore Mancuso, commander of the AUC, admitted in 2023 that his organisation had supported Andres Pastrana's presidential campaign in 2002.

== President of Colombia (1998–2002) ==
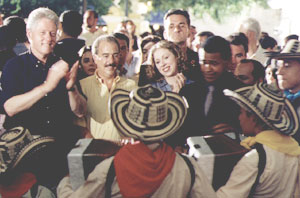
Bill Clinton, Andrés Pastrana (center) and Chelsea Clinton in Cartagena, Colombia, 30 August 2000

His presidency is remembered for his negotiations with the two left-wing guerrilla groups FARC and ELN, culminating in the grant of a demilitarized safe haven to the guerrillas the size of Switzerland, and for his breaking off the negotiations. It is also remembered for a growing degree of unpopularity in polls as his term progressed. Some critics accused him of possibly accepting unspecified bribes from leading FARC and ELN members, but no concrete evidence of that was presented during his presidency. He was also heavily criticized for all the seemingly-pleasure trips that he took around the world during his term.

In 1999, he and U.S. President Bill Clinton launched Plan Colombia to fight the communist guerrillas with the payment by the United States of $1.6 billion over three years to the Colombian army. An amendment quickly emphasized the plan's second function: to encourage foreign investment by "insisting that the Colombian government complete the urgent reforms designed to open its economy completely to foreign investment and trade."

In 2002, he supported the ousting of Hugo Chávez and the Interim Government of Pedro Carmona. Military counterguerrilla operations caused the forced displacement of more than one million people in four years. Cocaine production increased by 47% during that period.

== Ambassador of Colombia to the United States ==
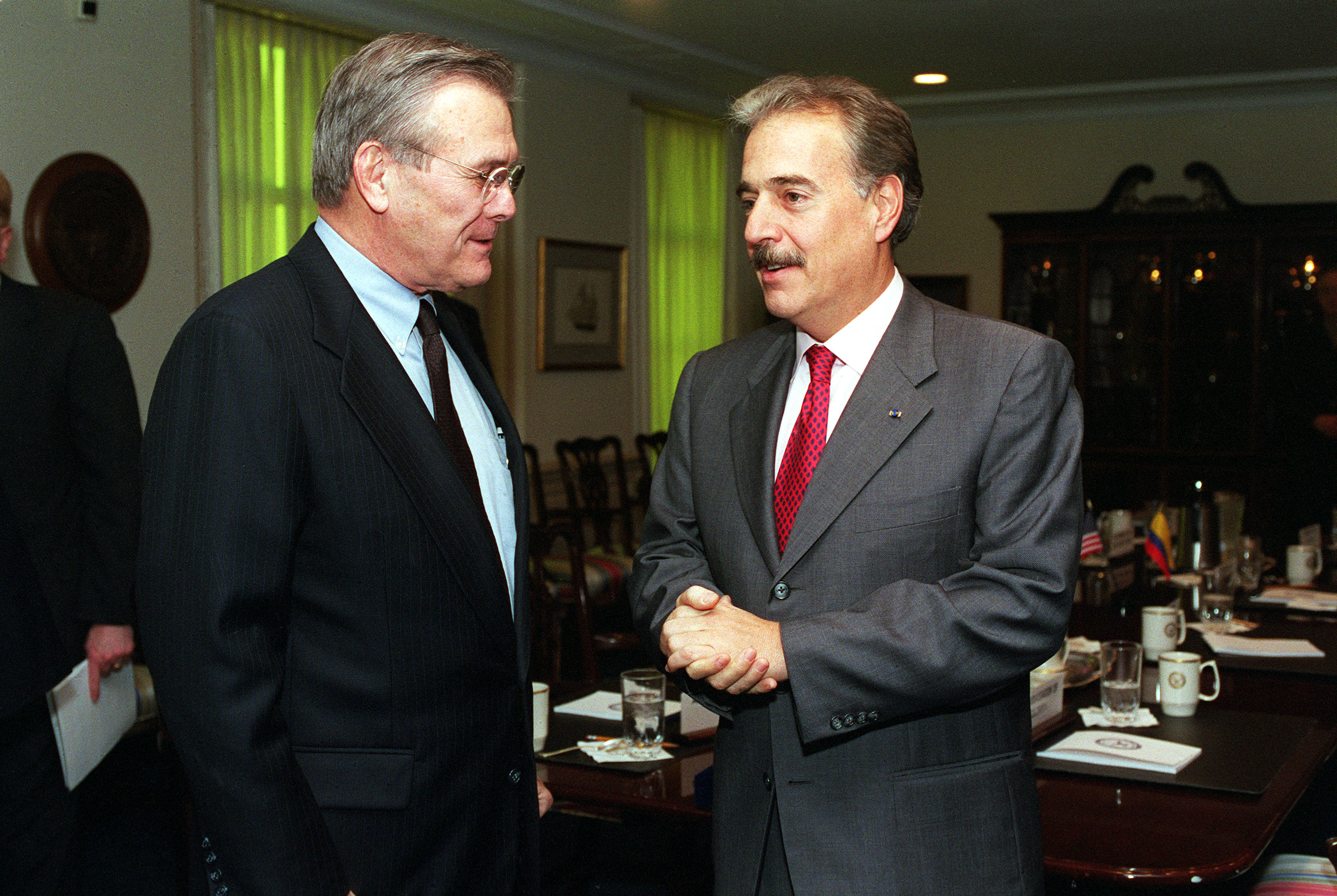
US Secretary of Defense Donald Rumsfeld meeting with Andrés Pastrana

In 2005 President Álvaro Uribe Vélez, who had been a critic of Pastrana's peace process with the FARC and had received criticisms from Pastrana regarding his negotiations with Colombian paramilitary groups, surprisingly offered the former president the post of Ambassador to the United States in Washington, DC. After consulting his family and his political supporters, Pastrana accepted.

Some political analysts theorized that Uribe considered that Pastrana would be a useful diplomat in Washington because he would help to renegotiate Plan Colombia and in general to maintain U.S. aid to Colombia, which has contributed to the successes of the Uribe administration.

=== Resignation ===
In July 2006, a few days after Uribe had appointed former President Ernesto Samper as Colombian ambassador to France, Pastrana told Uribe that he was "morally impeded" from participating in a government along with ex-President Samper. Pastrana resigned and returned to Colombia, and Samper rejected his own appointment. However, that move was not well received by the Conservative Party, which was committed to Uribe, who had won the presidency as an independent, and left Pastrana alone.

== Mentions in the Epstein files ==
Pastrana had a close friendship with Ghislaine Maxwell since 2002. According to Maxwell, they met in a pub in Dublin, and Pastrana invited Maxwell and Epstein to Colombia to fly Colombian army helicopters. In 2003, Pastrana visited Maxwell and Epstein in New York and Palm Beach, invited them to meet Fidel Castro in Cuba, and maintained email correspondence with Maxwell. According to the Epstein files, in 2009, Epstein emailed Jean-Luc Brunel with instructions involving Pastrana. Brunel emailed Pastrana, indicating prior acquaintance and enthusiasm to reconnect.

== Other activities ==
Pastrana is a board member in the International Foundation for Electoral Systems, and the honorary president of the Union of Latin American Parties (UPLA). He is also a member of the Fondation Chirac's honour committee, and of the Club de Madrid, a group of more than 80 former leaders of democratic countries, which works to strengthen democratic leadership worldwide. Pastrana also serves on the board of advisors for the Global Panel Foundation, and as a counsellor for One Young World's Dublin summit in 2014, along with four other former presidents from Latin American countries.

He now maintains a distant and hostile relationship with his own party, even referring to it as "absolutely corrupt". He has also levied accusations of corruption against two of the most prominent party leaders, Efraín Cepeda and Hernán Andrade.

He campaigned in 2016 against the peace agreements signed between the Colombian government and the guerrilla. He is a signatory of the Madrid Charter launched in 2020 by the Spanish party Vox to unite the radical right in Spain and Latin America against "narco-communism, the left and organized crime." In October 2021, his name was mentioned in the Pandora Papers as the owner of a company located in Panama, a country considered a tax haven, through which he makes investments in Colombia. He supported far-right candidate Javier Milei in 2023 Argentine general election.

Coat of arms of Andrés Pastrana as knight of the Order of the Golden Fleece

== Awards and honors ==
In 2013, Pastrana was awarded the Hanno R. Ellenbogen Citizenship Award jointly by the Prague Society for International Cooperation and Global Panel Foundation.

=== Foreign honours ===
- Chile:
  - Collar of the Order of the Merit of Chile (1999)
- Spain:
  - Knight of the Collar of the Order of Isabella the Catholic (1999)
- Ecudaor:
  - Grand Collar of the National Order of Merit (2000)
- Bolivia:
  - Grand Collar of the Order of the Condor of the Andes (2001)
- France:
  - Grand Cross of the National Order of the Legion of Honour (2001)
- Malaysia:
  - Honorary Recipient of the Order of the Crown of the Realm (2001)
- Peru:
  - Grand Cross with Diamonds of the Order of the Sun of Peru (2001)
- Poland:
  - Grand Cross of the Order of Merit of the Republic of Poland (2002)

== Popular culture ==
- Pastrana was a guest star on the TV Soap Opera Yo soy Betty, la fea.
- Andrés Pastrana is portrayed by the actor Andrés Ogilvie in TV Series Escobar, el Patrón del Mal.
- In TV series Tres Caínes is portrayed by Andrés Suárez as the character of Antonio Arango.
- In TV Series En la boca del lobo is portrayed by an unknown model as the character of Esteban Aldana.

== See also ==
- List of kidnappings
- Plan Colombia
- List of solved missing person cases (1980s)

Political offices
| Preceded by Julio César Sánchez | Mayor of Bogotá; 1988–1990 | Succeeded by Juan Martín Caycedo Ferrer |
| Preceded by Ernesto Samper | President of Colombia; 1998–2002 | Succeeded by Álvaro Uribe |
Party political offices
| Preceded by Rodrigo Hernán Lloreda | Conservative nominee for President of Colombia; 1994, 1998 | Succeeded by Juan Camilo Restrepo Salazar; Withdrew |
Diplomatic posts
| Preceded by Ernesto Samper | Secretary General of the Non-Aligned Movement; 1998 | Succeeded by Nelson Mandela |
| Preceded by Luis Alberto Moreno | Colombian Ambassador to the United States; 2005–2006 | Succeeded by Carolina Barco |
Order of precedence
| Preceded by Ernesto Samper as former President | Order of precedence of Colombia former President | Succeeded by Álvaro Uribe as former President |
