= Team Colombia =

Colombian political party

Team Colombia (Equipo Colombia) was a conservative political party in Colombia. In the 2002 legislative elections, the party won, as one of the many small parties, parliamentary representation. In the 2006 legislative elections, it joined forces with the Alternative for Social Advance (ALAS), another small party, and won 7 out of 166 deputies and 5 out of 100 senators. The two political movements joined to form ALAS-Team Colombia in 2005, later becoming Somos Región Colombia.
