= Chamicero de Perijá =

Nature reserve in Colombia

Chamicero de Perijá is a small nature reserve in Colombia established in 2014. It is centered on the Colombian side of the Serranía de Perijá mountain range, part of the East Andes. It holds incredible biodiversity and home to numerous endangered and endemic bird species. Chamicero de Perijá protects a 1,850 acres (750 ha) area of cloud forest habitat which is home to several rare bird taxa, including the Perijá Thistletail, the Perijá Metaltail, the Perijá Brushfinch, an endemic subspecies of the Rufous Antpitta, and the Perijá Tapaculo.

== Biodiversity ==
Other, more common, birds that reside within this reserve include the Rufous Spinetail, Yellow-breasted Brushfinch, Crested Quetzal, Golden-headed Quetzal, Barred Fruiteater, Andean Condor, Black-Chested Buzzard-Eagle, Plushcap, Buff-banded Mountain Tanager, Lacrimose Mountain Tanager, Hook-billed Kite, White-rumped Hawk and Páramo Seedeater. Due to its remoteness, it is very likely that there are many more species that have still not been documented yet in the region.

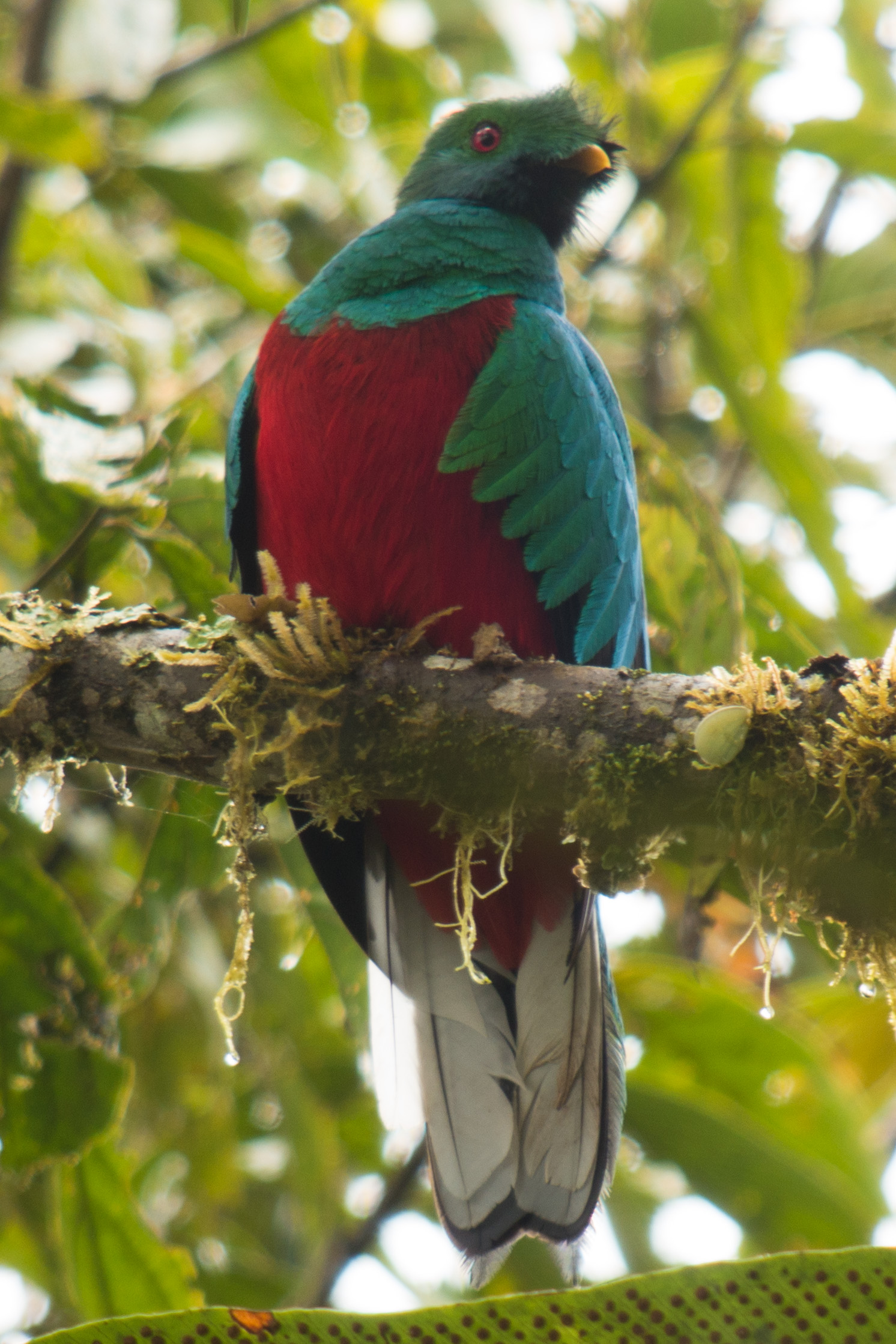
A Crested Quetzal.

== Geography ==
The Chamicero de Perijá reserve is located in the northern part of South America's Andes range, as part of the smaller Serranía de Perijá mountain range. The region is covered mainly by high Andean forest, páramo, and subpáramo grasslands. The region also has a number of rivers that run through it, most of which are feeders for the Manaure River.

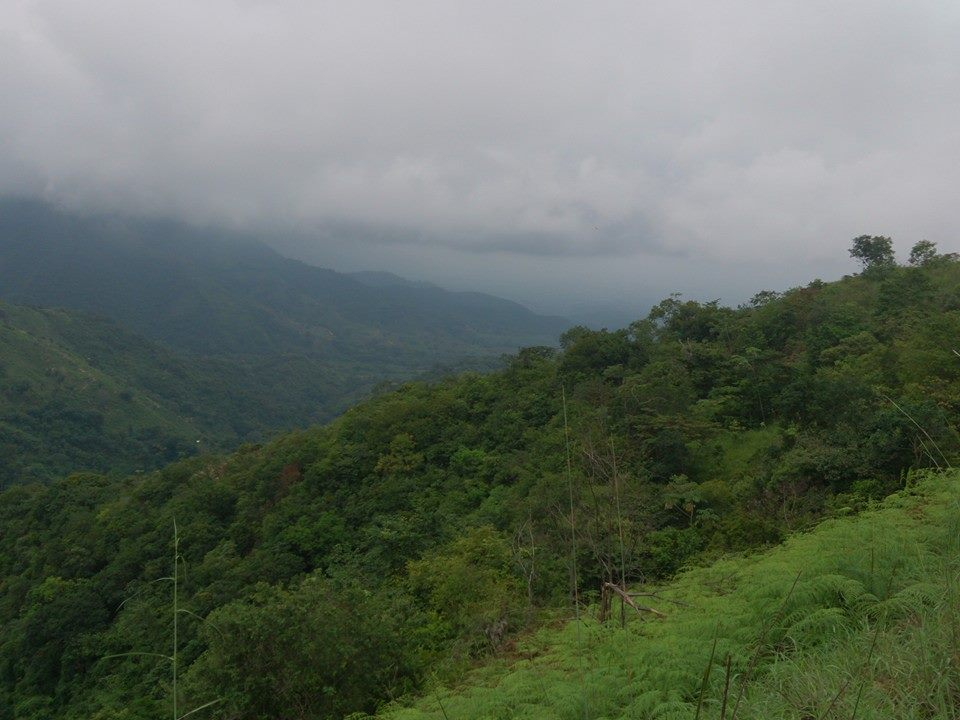
Overlook in the Serrania de Perijá, within which the Chamicero de Perijá reserve is located.

== Politics and founding ==
For decades, the region was inhabited by guerrilla fighters and narcos. In 2006, the Colombian government redoubled efforts to establish control in the area. Then in 2014, ProAves and the Rainforest Trust raised over $180,000 to buy the 1,850 acres to establish the reserve and help to protect it from deforestation, which had picked up pace in the years prior. Since then, birders and scientists have entered into the reserve to more thoroughly document the region and its endemic species.
