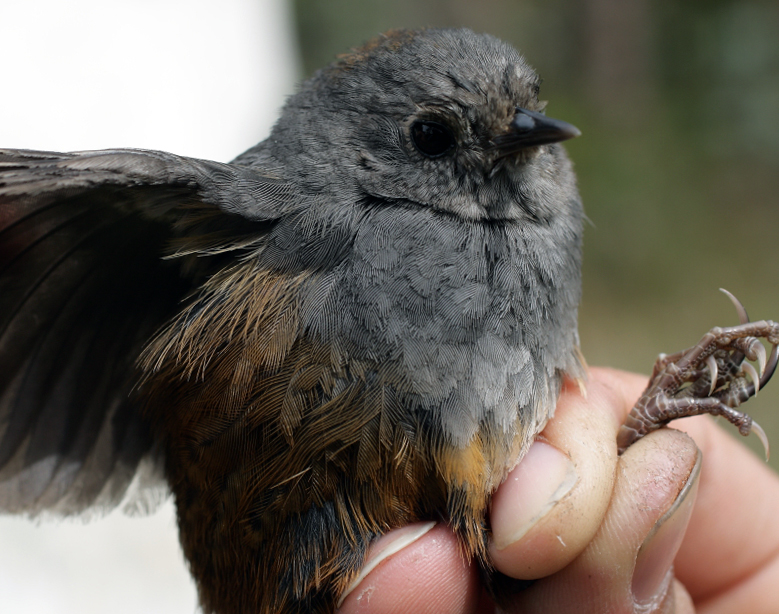

Conservation status
- Near Threatened (IUCN 3.1)

Scientific classification
- Kingdom: Animalia
- Phylum: Chordata
- Class: Aves
- Order: Passeriformes
- Family: Rhinocryptidae
- Genus: Scytalopus
- Species: S. perijanus

Binomial name
- Scytalopus perijanus Avendaño et al., 2015
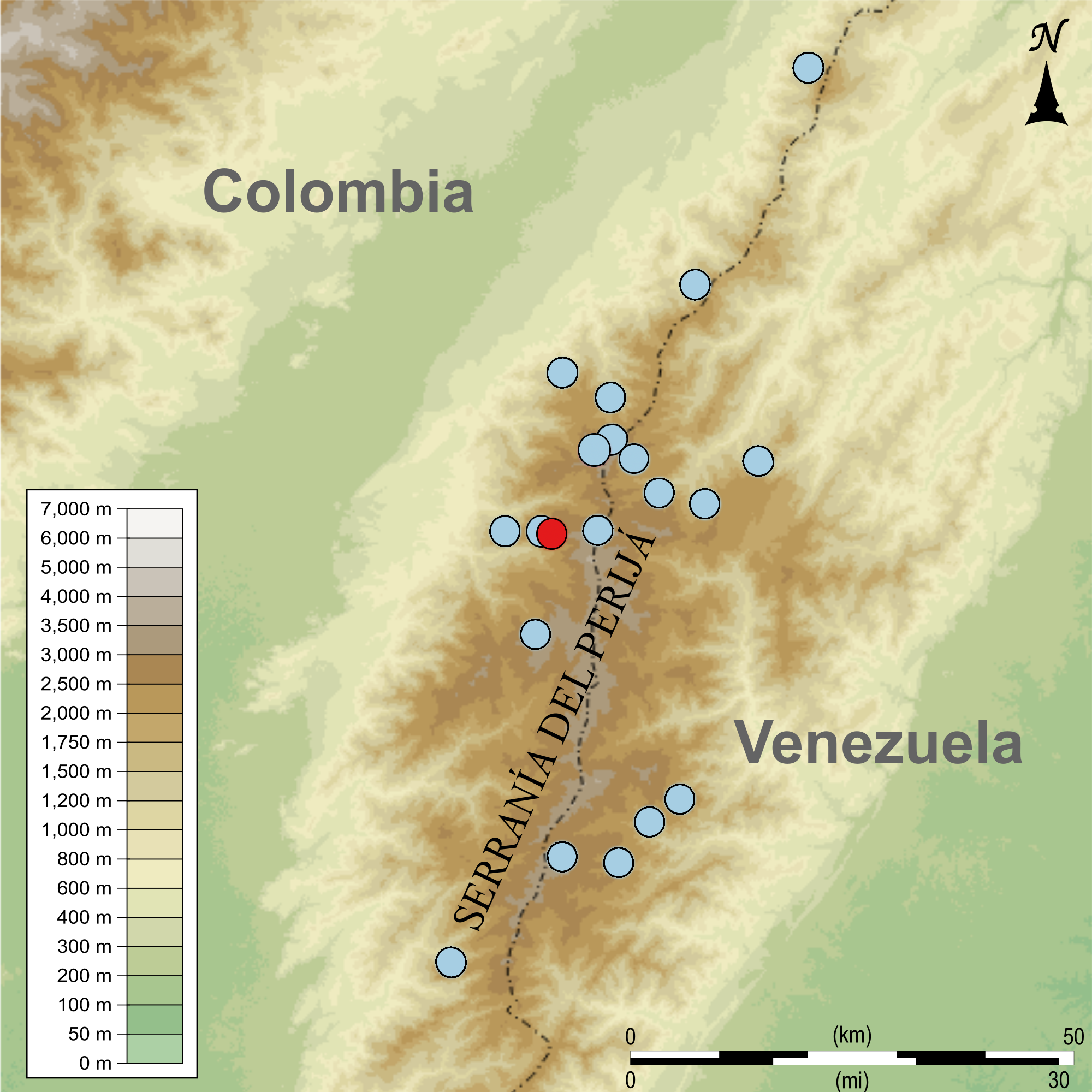
- Species records Type specimen Map of the Serranía del Perijá range

= Perijá tapaculo =

Passerine bird in Rhinocryptidae family, endemic to Colombia and Venezuela

The Perijá tapaculo (Scytalopus perijanus) is a species of passerine bird in the family Rhinocryptidae (tapaculos). Endemic to the Serranía del Perijá mountain range on the Colombia–Venezuela border, the Perijá tapaculo is found at altitudes of 1,600–3,225 metres (5,200–10,600 feet). Its body is 10 to 12 centimetres (3.9 to 4.7 inches) long and its tail is about 4 cm (1.6 in) long. Specimens have long been stored in museums, but the species was described only in 2015 based on sixteen specimens found between July 2008 and February 2009. It is considered vulnerable to extinction.

Adults have neutral grey heads, brown necks, brown-sepia striped backs, and grey-white bellies, breasts, and throats. Males have some buff markings on their breasts, and less sharp brown spots on their napes than females. The Perijá tapaculo is a secretive bird and therefore difficult to observe; as a result its ecology is poorly known. It feeds on insects and reproduces between April and July. Its range is partially within Chamicero de Perijá Bird Reserve in Colombia and the Sierra de Perijá National Park in Venezuela.

== Taxonomy ==
Tapaculos are the most primitive family of suboscines, divided into 12 genera containing 60 species. Scytalopus, the genus to which the Perijá tapaculo belongs, has an abundance of similar species, many of which are difficult to classify through appearance. Some individual species from other genera are like Scytalopus in size and plumage, but have different behaviour and morphological features. Vocal studies and mitochondrial DNA analysis are often used to differentiate between species within the genus; a number of visually identical species previously classified as subspecies of the Magellanic tapaculo (S. magellanicus) have been identified through these methods, and the majority of subspecies within the genus have subsequently been reclassified as separate species.

Between 1941 and 1942, American ornithologist Melbourne Armstrong Carriker collected 27 specimens of the Perijá tapaculo in six locations on the western side of the Serranía del Perijá. He identified them as specimens of the white-crowned tapaculo (S. atratus), despite size and colour differences, and sent them to the National Museum of Natural History in Washington, D.C. In 1953, the specimens began to attract the attention of biologists, and were successively identified as the brown-rumped tapaculo (S. latebricola), the Caracas tapaculo (S. caracae), and the Mérida tapaculo (S. meridanus). Some further believed that the specimens could belong to an undescribed species, or constitute a subspecies of the pale-bellied tapaculo (S. griseicollis) or the Mérida tapaculo based on morphological studies, but they were never classified as any of these.

In September 2006, biologists Juan Pablo López and Alexander Cortés Diago found two specimens in a cloud forest at an altitude of 2,450 m (8,000 ft) on the western side of the Serranía del Perijá in Colombia, but the information collected was insufficient to identify a new species. Between July 2008 and February 2009, sixteen new specimens were collected in an area previously explored by Carriker. New vocal, morphological, genetic, and ecological studies of these specimens confirmed that they constituted a new species, Scytalopus perijanus, first described by Jorge Enrique Avendaño et al. on 11 March 2015 following a three-year expedition, and accepted by the South American Classification Committee. The Latin word perijanus refers to the Serranía del Perijá mountain range, and the genus name Scytalopus comes from the Greek skutale (stick) and pous (foot).

The type specimen of the Perijá tapaculo, an adult male, was found in the Serranía del Perijá near the El Cinco vereda of Manaure, Cesar Department, Colombia, at an altitude of 2,450 m (8,000 ft). Avendaño lured the specimen by playing a recording of its song on 10 July 2008 at the edge of a montane forest. Sequence analysis of the mitochondrial gene ND2 from the Perijá tapaculo showed that its nearest relatives are the brown-rumped tapaculo, Caracas tapaculo, and Mérida tapaculo.

== Description ==
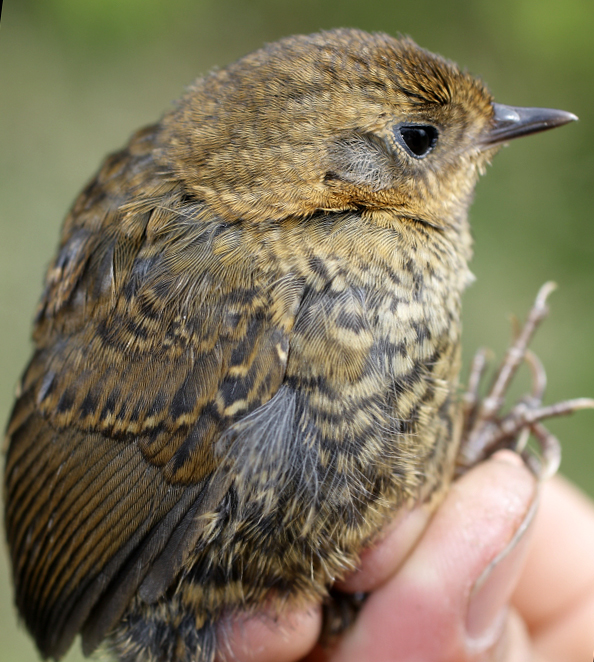
A juvenile specimen of the Perijá tapaculo

The Perijá tapaculo is a small bird, 10 to 12 cm (3.9 to 4.7 in) in length with an average mass of 17 to 18 grams (about 0.6 oz). The bill averages 6.8 millimetres (0.27 inches) long, 2.9 mm (0.11 in) wide, and 3.5 mm (0.14 in) high. The legs are about 21 mm (0.83 in) long. The Perijá tapaculo's tarsus averages 21.1 millimetres (0.83 in) long. The wings measure 57.4 mm (2.26 in) on average and the tail is about 40 mm (1.6 in) long with between 8 and 12 rectrices.

The forehead, lores, crown, mantle, and scapular area are a neutral grey colour. There is a brown spot on the nape. The top of the tail is brown, and the bottom is faintly striped brown. The bird's back and rump are striped brown-sepia, and the throat, breast, and belly are grey-white. Its lower belly and flanks are tawny. The iris is dark brown. Male specimens are distinguished by having less sharp brown spots on their napes, and the bottom of their breasts are mixed with a pale buff colour. The legs are brown on the back and whitish on the front. Young birds have a yellowish appearance with striped brown flanks.

The bird's plumage colouration is most similar to the pale-bellied tapaculo. The S. g. morenoi subspecies of the pale-bellied tapaculo can be differentiated from the Perijá tapaculo by its entirely brown back and nape, and its different calls. Juveniles of this subspecies have a dull ventral plumage, while the Perijá tapaculo has a more yellow plumage. It also resembles the Caracas tapaculo but has a duller ventral colour.

== Ecology and behaviour ==
Song and call

Like other species in genus Scytalopus, the Perijá tapaculo is secretive and therefore difficult to observe. The call and song differ from those of most other species in the genus, and the latter is composed of two short churrs repeating up to 65 times at 0.5 to 3 second intervals. The diet of the species is little known, but studies of the stomach contents of seven specimens suggested that they fed exclusively on insects.

Little is known about the reproduction of the species, but it is believed to nest between April and July. The species builds its globular nests in underground cavities about 12 cm (4.7 in) in diameter and about 14.5 cm (5.7 in) in height, lined with mosses, grasses, and plant roots around a central space about 9 cm (3.5 in) wide. The nests are accessed by a short tunnel with a depth of 10 cm (3.9 in) and a diameter of 4.2 cm (1.7 in). Young birds may leave the nest at the end of June. Like those of other Scytalopus species, male specimens have demonstrated involvement in parenting.

== Distribution and habitat ==
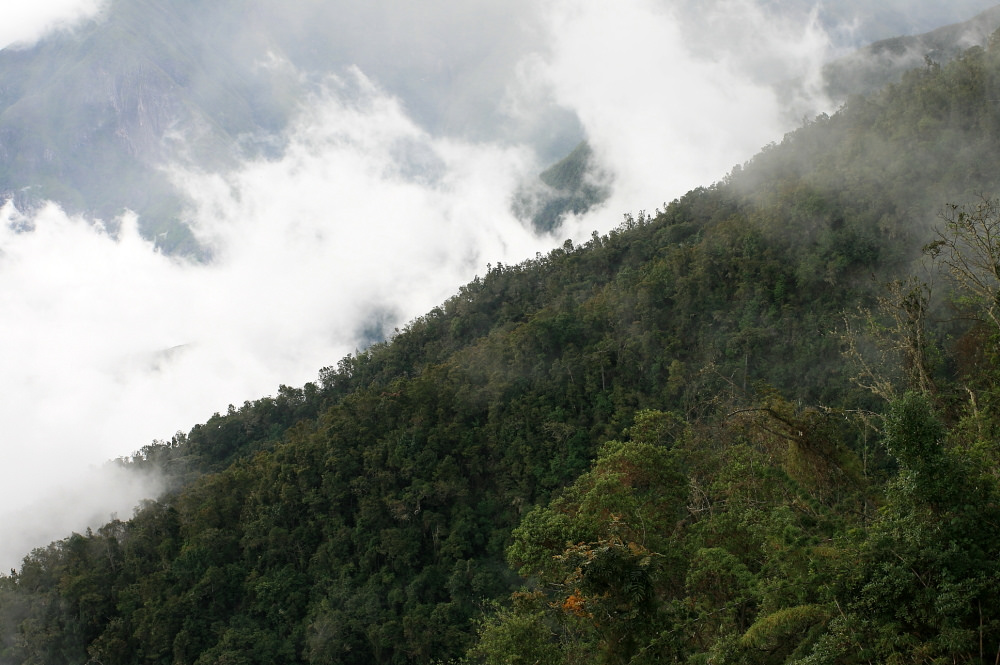
The Serranía del Perijá mountain range near the El Cinco vereda in Colombia, where the type specimen was collected

The Perijá tapaculo is endemic to the Serranía del Perijá, a mountain range on the Colombia–Venezuela border known for its high rates of endemism. It has been observed in nineteen localities on both sides of the border between altitudes of 1,600 and 3,225 m (5,200 and 10,600 ft) above sea level; in its northern range, there are no suitable forests below 1,600 m (5,200 ft). The bird has been observed at 1,800–3,120 m (5,900–10,200 ft) on the Venezuelan side, and at 1,600–3,225 m on the Colombian side.

The Perijá tapaculo lives in and on the edges of humid rainforests, as well as in elfin forests and amongst woody páramo shrubs in high-mountain grassland areas, especially at altitudes of 2,500–3,000 m (8,200–9,800 ft). Some specimens have been observed feeding in dense thickets within 1 m (3 ft) of the ground, often near the forest. Others have been observed running among bushes through open grassy areas.

The species has not been identified as being sympatric with any other species of the genus Scytalopus. However, there is a possibility that its range overlaps with that of the S. atratus nigricans, which occupies a different micro-habitat on the eastern side of the Serranía del Perijá at altitudes of 1,500–1,900 m (4,900–6,200 ft); or that it may be found within the range of the pale-bellied tapaculo in the lower reaches of the Serranía de Los Motilones mountain range, south of the Serranía del Perijá.

== Threats and protection ==
Avendaño et al. wrote in the original description of the Perijá tapaculo that the size and quality of the species' range are being reduced, although it can tolerate a certain level of fragmentation of its range. Its natural habitat covers about 5,000 square kilometres (1,900 sq mi). The description entails the International Union for Conservation of Nature (IUCN) classification of this species as near threatened. The authors believe that to protect the Perijá tapaculo, conservation measures on the Colombian side of the border should be implemented, as the forests of the Serranía del Perijá have been largely destroyed on the Colombian side by logging activities and forest clearance for agriculture.

On 28 January 2014, prior to the formal description of the bird, the Chamicero de Perijá Bird Reserve was created by Fundación ProAves to maintain one of Colombia's most fragile habitats. In addition to the Perijá tapaculo, several other Perijá-endemic endangered species, such as the Perijá metaltail (Metallura iracunda) and Perijá thistletail (Asthenes perijana) are protected within this reserve's 749 hectares (1,850 acres). The Colombian section of the Serranía del Perijá is dangerous for scientific excursions due to the presence of the FARC guerrilla group in the region. In Venezuela, the Sierra de Perijá National Park covers 300,000 hectares (740,000 acres) and partially protects the habitat of the Perijá tapaculo.
