= Aromobates tokuko =

Conservation status
- Vulnerable (IUCN 3.1)

Scientific classification
- Kingdom: Animalia
- Phylum: Chordata
- Class: Amphibia
- Order: Anura
- Family: Aromobatidae
- Genus: Aromobates
- Species: A. tokuko

Binomial name
- Aromobates tokuko Rojas-Runjaic, Infante-Rivero, and Barrio-Amorós, 2011

Species of frog

Aromobates tokuko, or Perija's nurse frog, is a frog. It is endemic to Zulia, Venezuela.

== Habitat ==
This diurnal frog lives in riparian habitats in basomontane forests and in evergreen forests at higher elevations on the east side of Sierra de Perijá. Most of the sites where this frog has been observed are near indigenous villages. Scientists have observed the frog 419–1,005 metres (1,375–3,297 ft) above sea level.

Almost all of the frog's known range overlaps with Sierra de Perijá National Park.

== Reproduction ==
The male frog calls to female frogs during the day from a hiding place beneath a rock or inside a rotting log. Scientists saw tadpoles in pools associated with the same streams where the adults were found. Scientists infer that the rest of the reproductive process takes place in the same manner as in other frogs in Aromobates: The female frog lays eggs in leaf litter and, after the eggs hatch, the male frog carries the tadpoles to water.

== Threats ==
The IUCN classifies this frog as vulnerable to extinction. Much of its range is within a protected park, but it is subject to some habitat loss in favor of large cocoyam plantations. The frog has been observed living on traditional shade coffee farms, so scientists infer it can tolerate some habitat disturbance.

== Original publication ==
- Rojas-Runjaic FJM; Infante-Rivero EE; Barrio-Amoros CL (2011). "A new frog of the genus Aromobates (Anura, Dendrobatidae) from Sierra de Perija, Venezuela". Zootaxa. 2919: 37–50.
