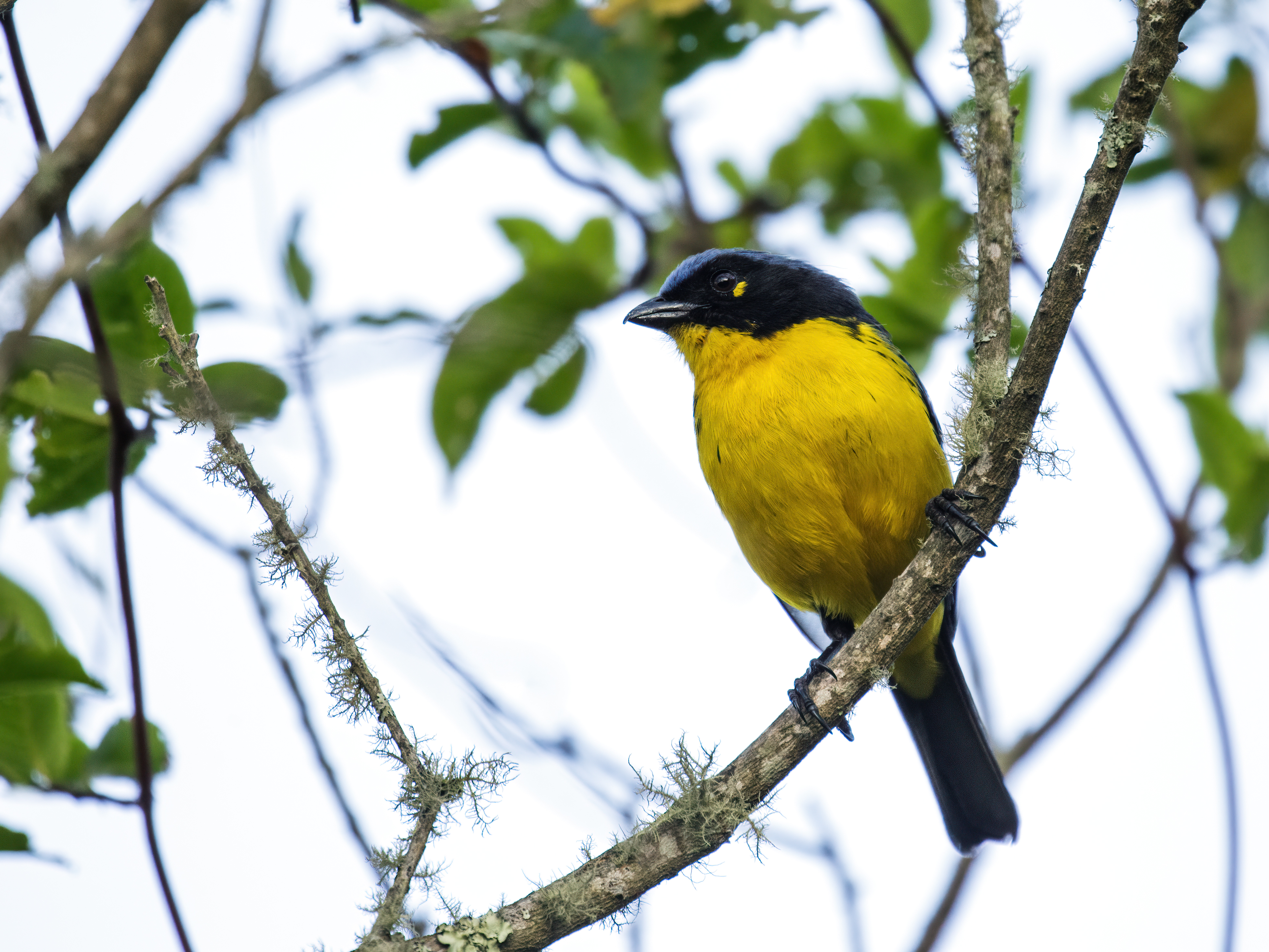

Conservation status
- Least Concern (IUCN 3.1)

Scientific classification
- Kingdom: Animalia
- Phylum: Chordata
- Class: Aves
- Order: Passeriformes
- Family: Thraupidae
- Genus: Anisognathus
- Species: A. melanogenys

Binomial name
- Anisognathus melanogenys (Salvin & Godman, 1880)

= Santa Marta mountain tanager =

Species of bird

The Santa Marta mountain tanager (Anisognathus melanogenys), also known as the black-cheeked mountain tanager, is a species of bird in the family Thraupidae. It is endemic to highland forest in the Santa Marta Mountains in Colombia. It is closely related to the widespread lacrimose mountain tanager, but the distributions of the two do not overlap.

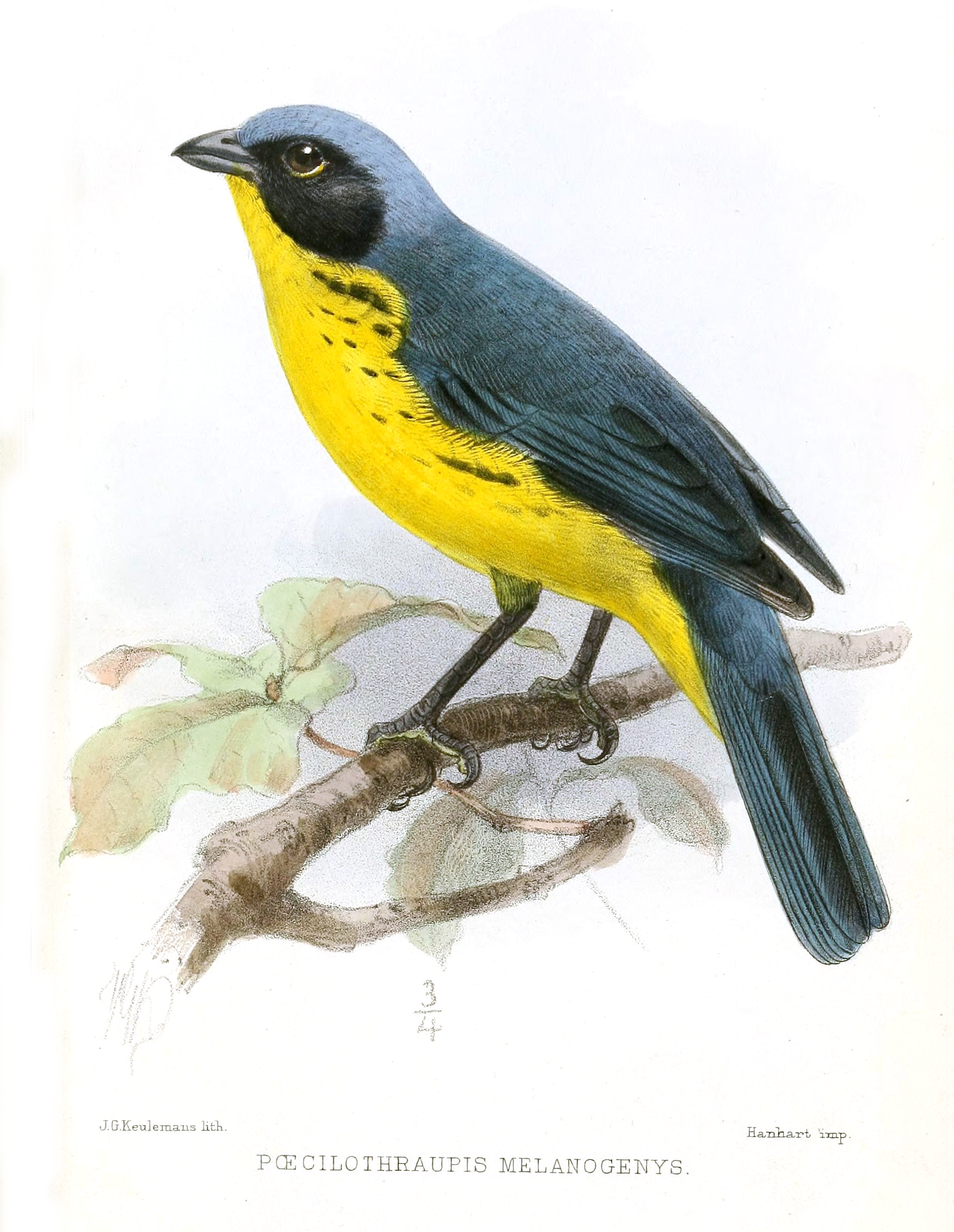
