= Sierra de Perijá National Park =

National park in Venezuela

Sierra de Perijá National Park Perijá National Park
- IUCN category II (national park)
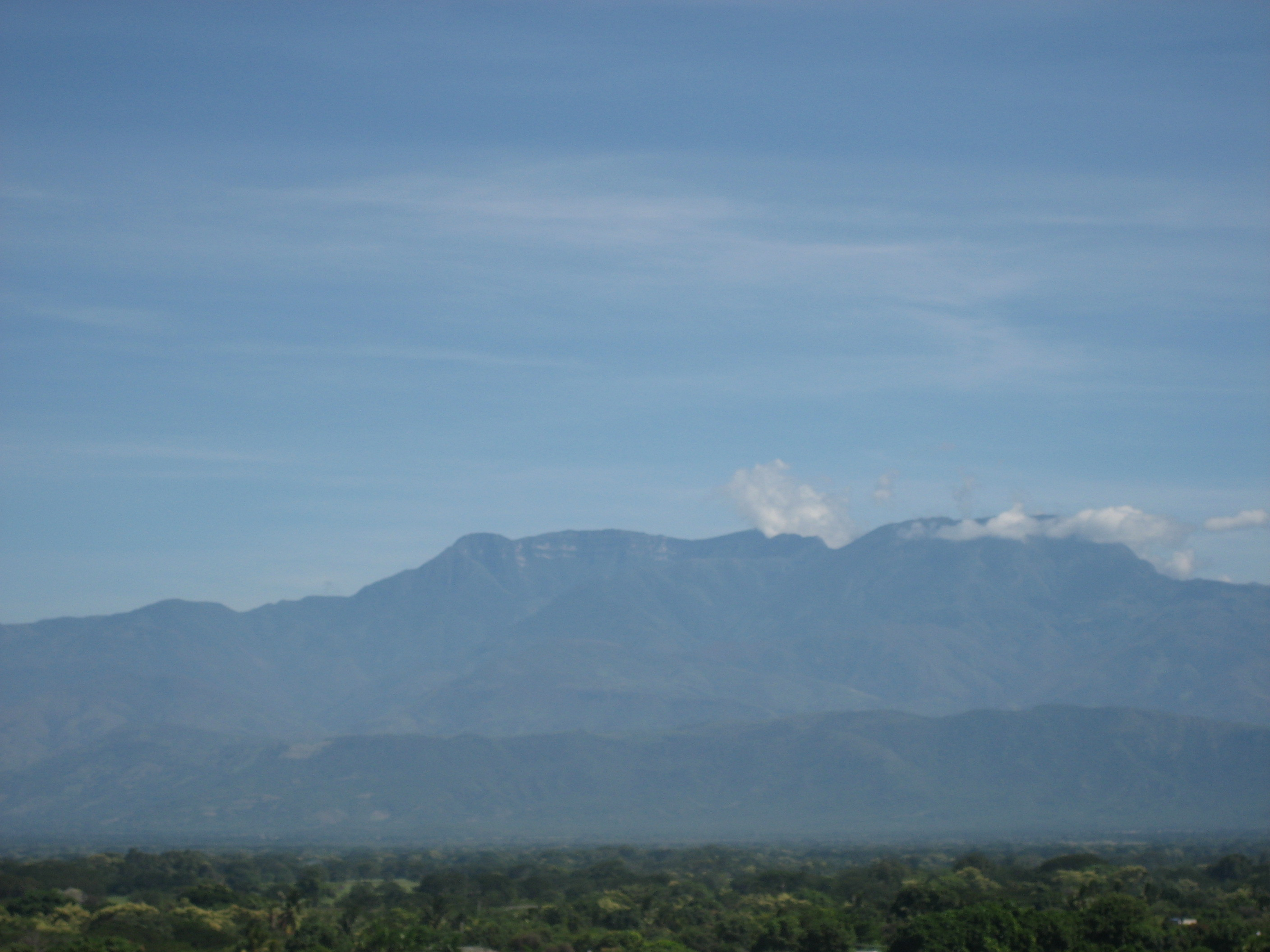
- Perijá National Park

- Location within Venezuela
- Location: Venezuela
- Nearest city: Maracaibo
- Coordinates: 9°32′0″N 73°0′0″W
- Area: 295,288 hectares (729,670 acres)
- Established: 1978
- Governing body: Instituto Nacional de Parques(INPARQUES) ’’National Park Institute’’

Sierra de Perijá National Park, also known as Perijá National Park (Spanish: Parque Nacional Sierra de Perijá) is a protected area in western Venezuela, in the Serranía de Perijá mountains, on the border with Colombia. The national park, located southwest of Zulia state and Lake Maracaibo, was established in 1978 with the objective of protecting the biodiversity of the hilly regions.

== Geography ==
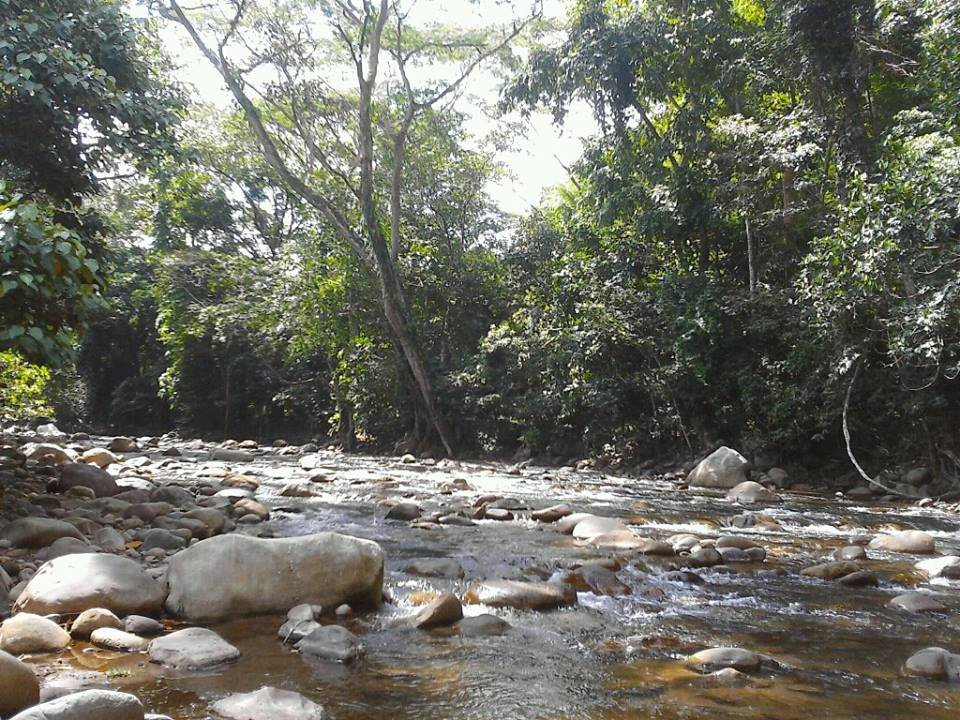
A river in the park.

Sierra de Perijá National Park is in the Perija and Colon municipalities of Zulia State. The park is accessible by road from Maracaibo.

The park includes a portion of the Serranía de Perijá mountains, which rises above the southwestern area of Lake Maracaibo, a large brackish bay connected to the Gulf of Venezuela. The highest elevation is Pico Tétar at 3,500 metres (11,500 ft). It covers an area of 295,288 hectares (729,670 acres).

== Flora and fauna ==
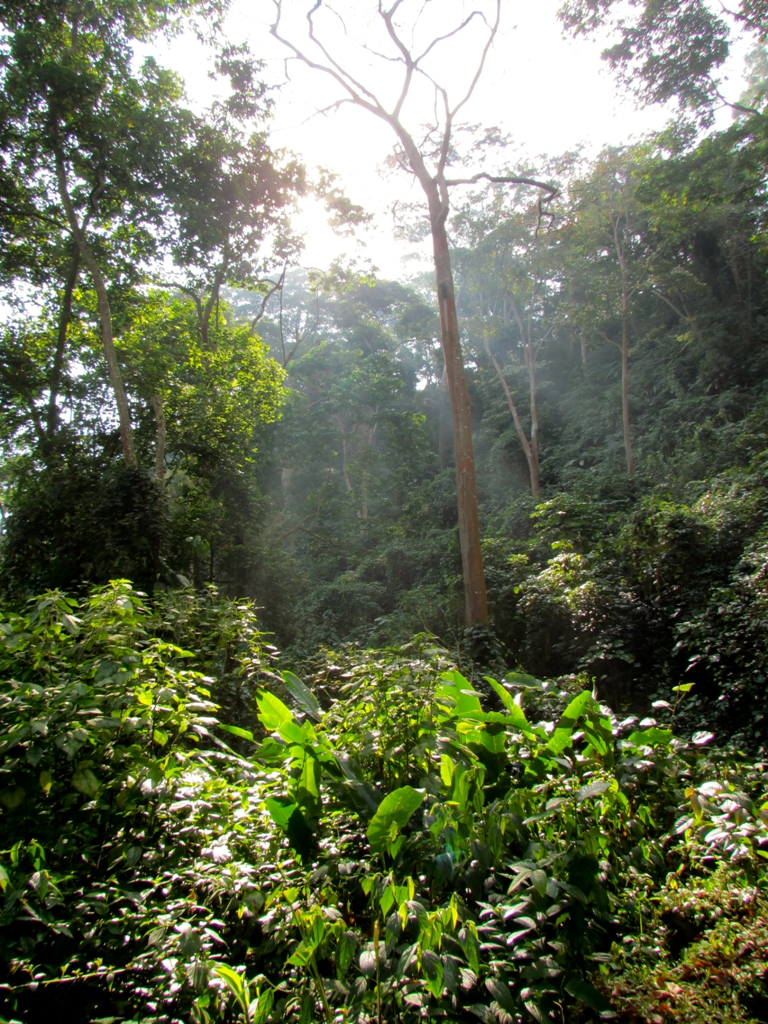
Forested area

The vegetation in the park consists mainly of rainforest, cloud forests, highland moors and some sub-alpine and alpine tundra. Typical species of trees include Anacardium excelsum, the wax palms Ceroxylon, Cecropia, Gyranthera caribensis, Tabebuia chrysantha, T. billbergii, T. chrysea and Podocarpus oleifolius, as well as countless herbaceous and flowering plants, epiphytic and vining aroids, ferns, mosses, lichens, carnivorous plants, tropical cacti and bromeliads. Aquatic plant species are varied, as well, including Echinodorus,

Fauna in the park is varied, and includes some larger carnivores and omnivores, such as the rare spectacled bear (Tremarctos ornatus—the only extant bear species found in South America). Iconic South American mammals include the red-rumped agouti (Dasyprocta leporina), lesser capybara (Hydrochoerus isthmius), giant anteater, northern tamandua, paca, and larger felids, including the puma or South American mountain lion (Felis c. concolor) and the ocelot (Leopardus pardalis). Rare, but potential, sightings of jaguar (Panthera onca) and jaguarundi (Felis yagouaroundi) can occur. These predators typically stalk the region's small native deer, including the Amazonian brown brocket (Mazama nemorivaga), the common red brocket (Mazama americana) and the little red brocket (Mazama rufina), as well as the collared peccary (Tayassu angulatus), a wild relative of pigs. Primates include the Colombian red howler (Alouatta seniculus), grey-handed night, varied capuchin (Cebus versicolor) and long-haired spider monkeys (Ateles hybridus). Guiana dolphins (Sotalia guianensis) living in Lake Maracaibo are proposed to be included under a protection program through the South American River Dolphin Protected Area Network.

Birds are many, and include parrot species such as the well-known and endangered military macaw (Ara militaris), as well as many hummingbirds, including the endangered Perijá metaltail (Metallura iracunda) and Coeligena consita, an endemic species of the southern Sierra de Perijá. A newly described species of tapaculo found in the park is the Perijá tapaculo (Scytalopus perijanus), first formally described in 2015.

== Threats ==
Uncontrolled fires and deforestation are major threats to the natural ecosystems in the park.

== Bibliography ==
- Dallmeier, Francisco Gomez; Cringan, Alexander T. (1989). Biology, Conservation and Management of Waterfowl in Venezuela. Editorial Ex Libris. ISBN 978-980-6200-13-5.
- Hoyt, Erich (2 October 2012). Marine Protected Areas for Whales, Dolphins and Porpoises: A World Handbook for Cetacean Habitat Conservation and Planning. Routledge. ISBN 978-1-136-53830-8.
