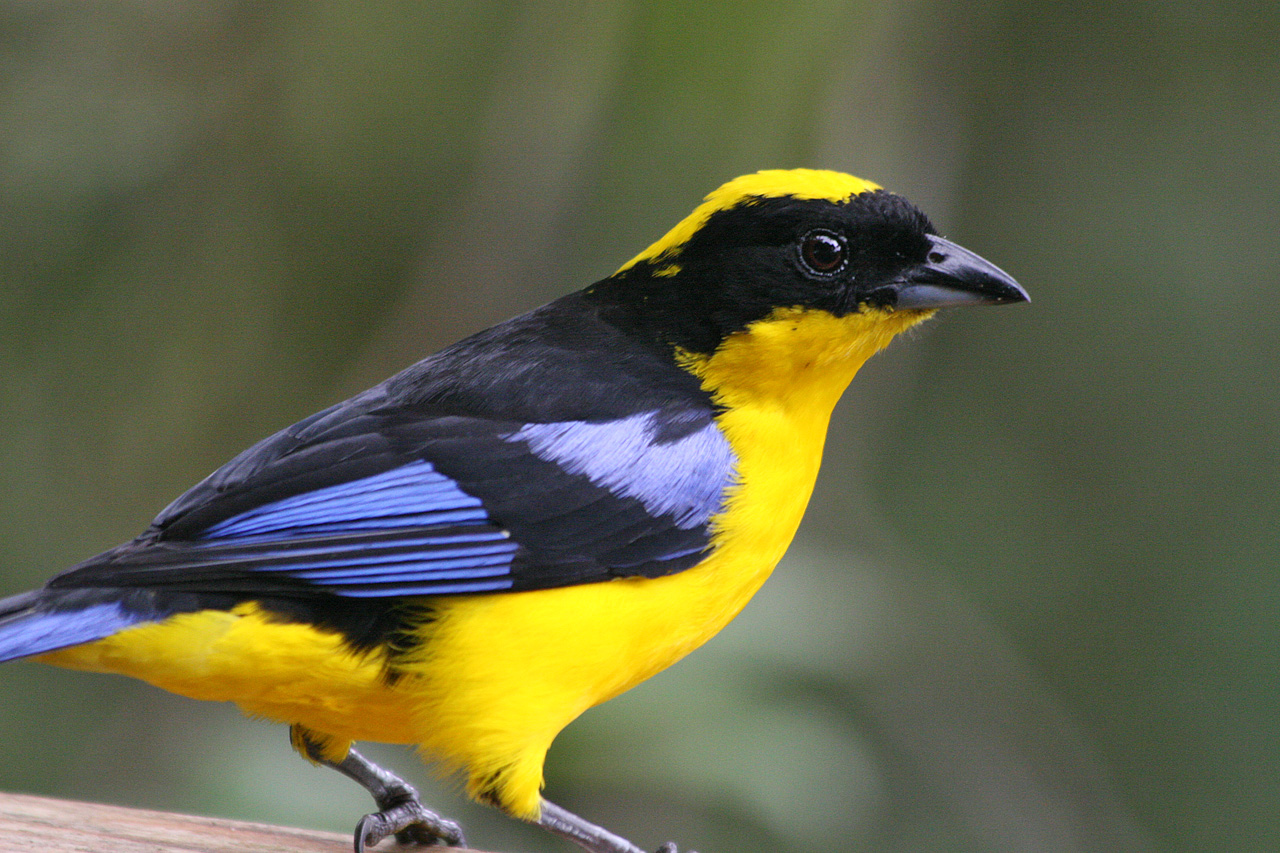
- In Ecuador

Conservation status
- Least Concern (IUCN 3.1)

Scientific classification
- Kingdom: Animalia
- Phylum: Chordata
- Class: Aves
- Order: Passeriformes
- Family: Thraupidae
- Genus: Anisognathus
- Species: A. somptuosus

Binomial name
- Anisognathus somptuosus (Lesson, 1831)

Synonyms
- Anisognathus flavinucha (Lesson, 1831)

= Blue-winged mountain tanager =

Species of bird

The blue-winged mountain tanager (Anisognathus somptuosus) is a species of bird in the family Thraupidae, the tanagers. It is found in highland forest and woodland in the Andes of Bolivia, Colombia, Ecuador, Peru and Venezuela, as well as a disjunct population in the Venezuelan Coastal Range. It is a common species and its populations appear to be stable. It is generally bright yellow and black with blue to the wings and tail; some populations have a moss-green back. In Bolivia and southernmost Peru, the rump is blue and the voice is very different; this population is sometimes recognized as a separate species, the Bolivian mountain tanager (A. flavinucha).

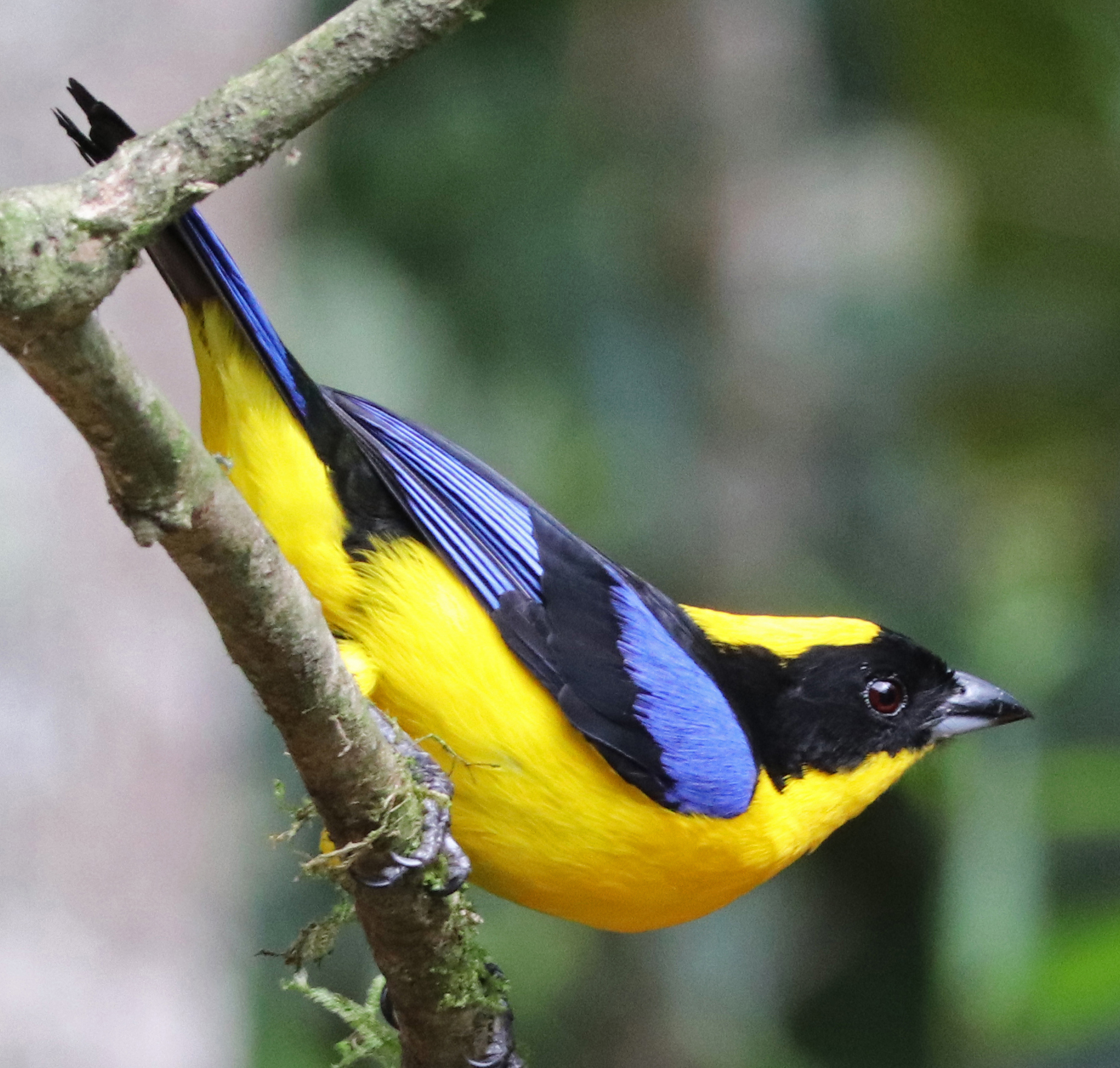
Blue-winged mountain tanager in northwest Ecuador
