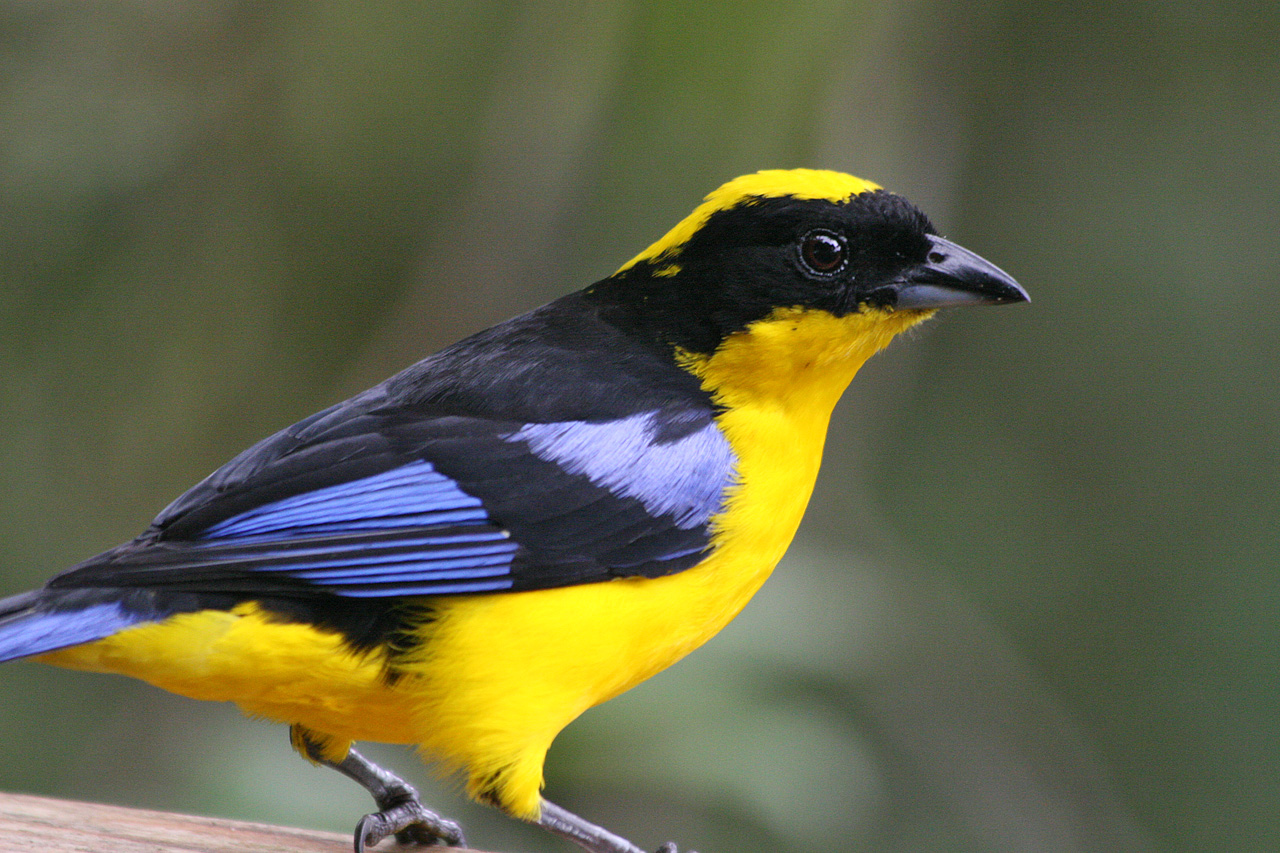
- Blue-winged mountain tanager (Anisognathus somptuosus)

Scientific classification
- Kingdom: Animalia
- Phylum: Chordata
- Class: Aves
- Order: Passeriformes
- Family: Thraupidae
- Genus: Anisognathus; Reichenbach, 1850

Type species
- Tanagra igniventris d'Orbigny & Lafresnaye, 1837

Species
- See text

= Anisognathus =

Genus of birds

Anisognathus is a genus of boldly colored tanagers found in the highland forests and woodlands of South America.

== Taxonomy and species list ==
The genus Anisognathus was introduced in 1850 by the German naturalist Ludwig Reichenbach. The type species was subsequently designated as the scarlet-bellied mountain tanager by the French naturalist Charles Lucien Bonaparte. The genus name combines the Ancient Greek anisos meaning "unequal" and gnathos meaning "lower jaw". Five species are placed in this genus.

Image	Scientific name	Common name	Distribution
	Anisognathus melanogenys	Santa Marta mountain tanager	Santa Marta Mountains in Colombia
	Anisognathus lacrymosus	Lacrimose mountain tanager	Venezuela, through Colombia and Ecuador, to Peru.
	Anisognathus igniventris	Scarlet-bellied mountain tanager	Bolivia, Colombia, Ecuador, Peru, and Venezuela
	Anisognathus somptuosus	Blue-winged mountain tanager	Bolivia, Colombia, Ecuador, Peru, Venezuela and Brazil
	Anisognathus notabilis	Black-chinned mountain tanager	Colombia and Ecuador
