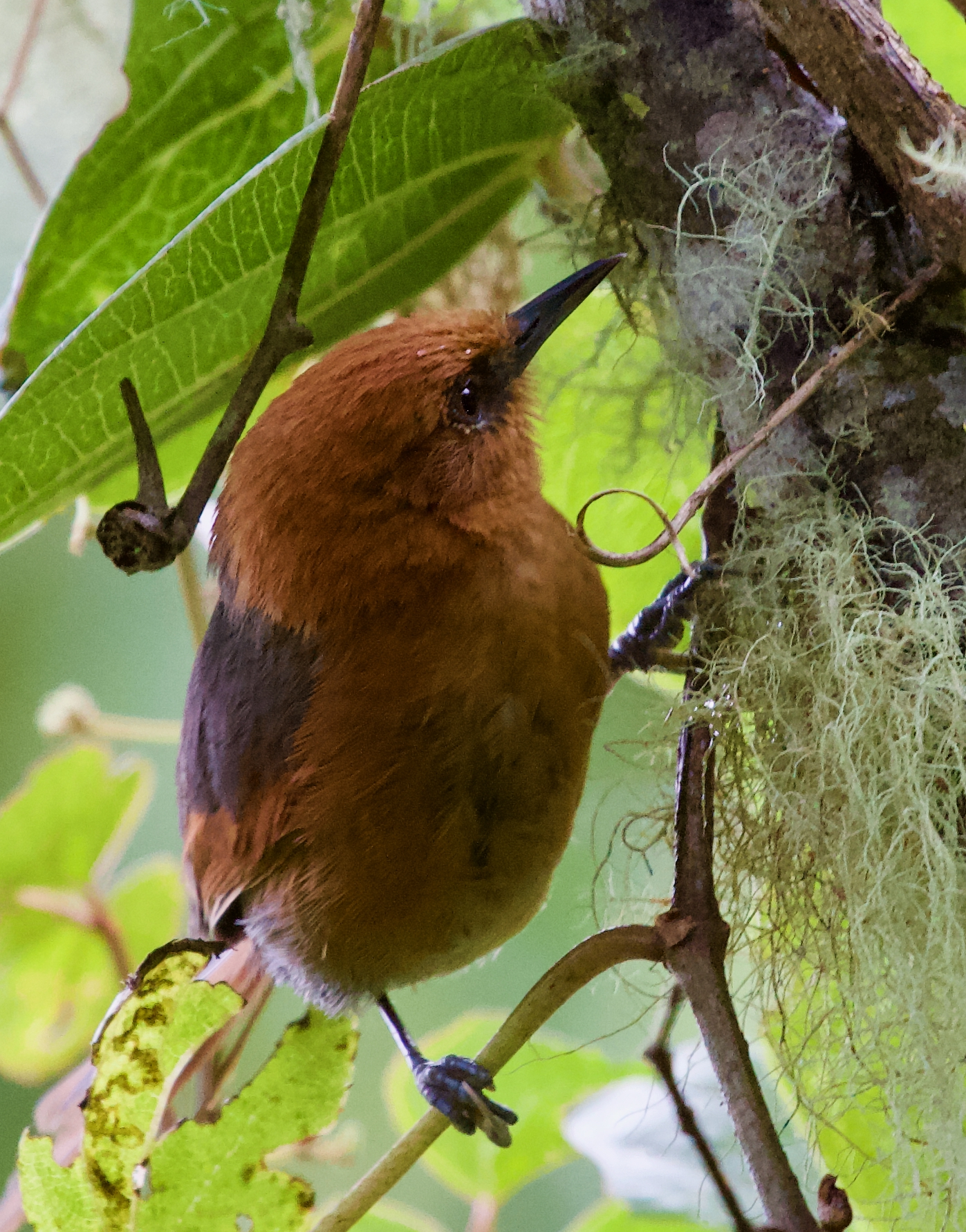
- foraging in undergrowth

Conservation status
- Near Threatened (IUCN 3.1)

Scientific classification
- Kingdom: Animalia
- Phylum: Chordata
- Class: Aves
- Order: Passeriformes
- Family: Furnariidae
- Genus: Synallaxis
- Species: S. fuscorufa

Binomial name
- Synallaxis fuscorufa Sclater, PL, 1882

= Rusty-headed spinetail =

Species of bird

The rusty-headed spinetail (Synallaxis fuscorufa) is a Near Threatened species of bird in the Furnariinae subfamily of the ovenbird family Furnariidae. It is endemic to Colombia.

== Taxonomy and systematics ==
The rusty-headed spinetail, rufous spinetail (S. unirufa), and black-throated spinetail (S. castanea) are closely related and some authors have treated them as a single species. The rusty-headed spinetail is monotypic.

== Description ==
The rusty-headed spinetail is 16 to 18 cm (6.3 to 7.1 in) long and weighs 15 to 17 g (0.53 to 0.60 oz). The sexes have the same plumage. Adults are mostly bright reddish rufous. They do have dark lores, a dull grayish olive back, olive flanks, and a somewhat duller rufous tail. Their iris is reddish brown, their maxilla black, their mandible blue-gray, and their legs and feet gray to blue-gray. Juveniles have a much duller crown than adults, and tawny-olive edges on their underparts' feathers and faint barring on their belly. Their irises are light brown and their mandible yellowish pink.

== Distribution and habitat ==
The rusty-headed spinetail is found only in the isolated Sierra Nevada de Santa Marta of northern Colombia. It occurs only locally, inhabiting the bushy edges and undergrowth of evergreen forest, overgrown clearings, and second-growth scrub in the subtropical and temperate zones of the mountain range. In elevation it mostly ranges between 2,000 and 3,000 m (6,600 and 9,800 ft) but occurs as low as 760 m (2,500 ft).

== Behavior ==
=== Movement ===
The rusty-headed spinetail is a year-round resident throughout its range.

=== Feeding ===
The rusty-headed spinetail feeds on arthropods. It usually forages in pairs, gleaning prey from foliage and small branches in dense cover up to about 2 m (7 ft) above the ground.

=== Breeding ===
The rusty-headed spinetail's breeding season appears to include January to June. Nothing else is known about its breeding biology.

=== Vocalization ===
The rusty-headed spinetail's song is "3 fast notes, di-di-du". It is often repeated at short intervals for minutes at a time.

== Status ==
The IUCN originally in 2004 assessed the rusty-headed spinetail as Vulnerable but since 2021 has rated it Near Threatened. It has a small range; its estimated population of between 2500 and 10,000 mature individuals is believed to be stable. "Only 15% of the original vegetation in the Sierra Nevada de Santa Marta is currently unaltered" and forests are "at risk from illegal agricultural expansion, encroachment, logging and burning". It is considered fairly common to common but local.
