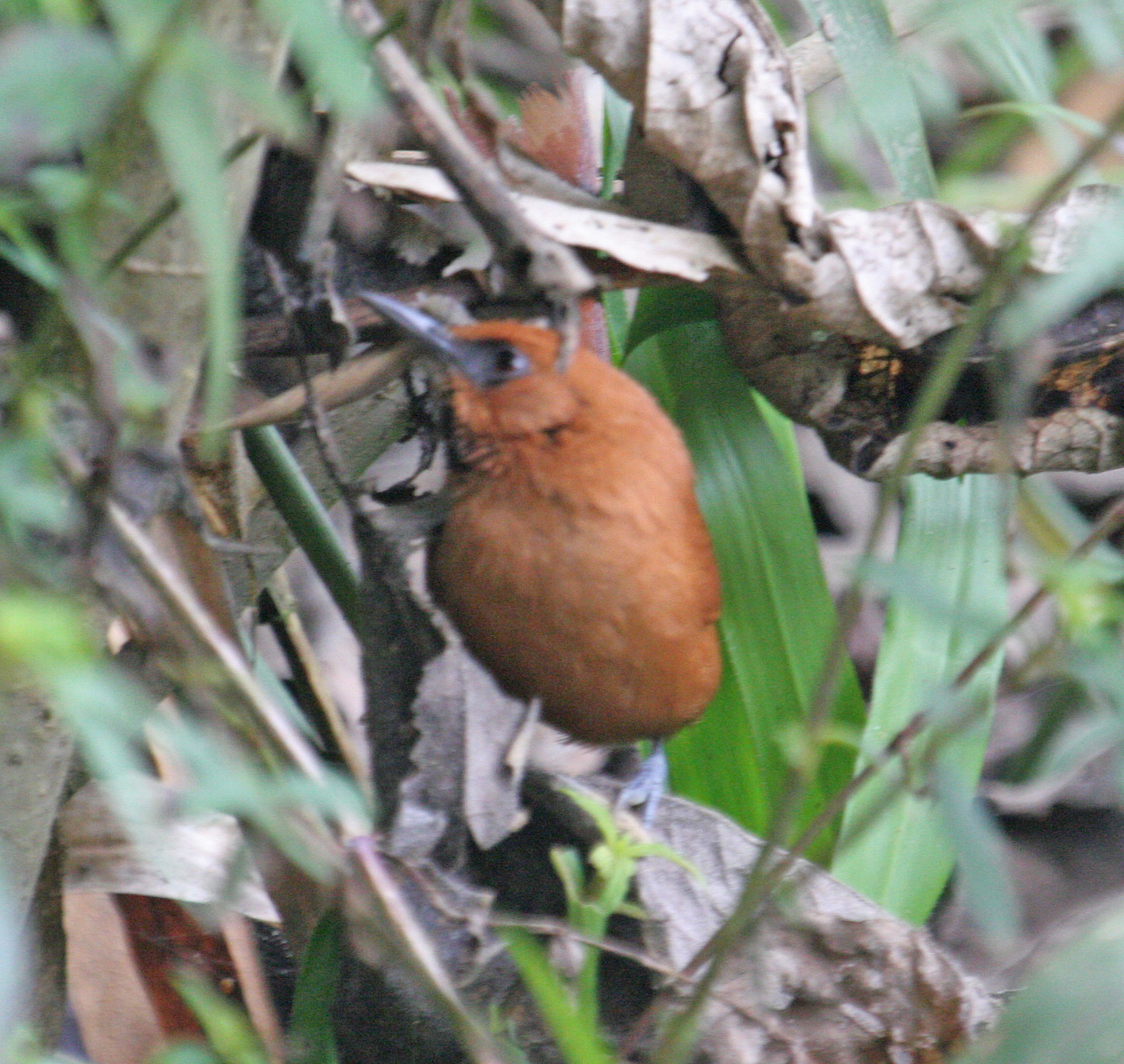

Conservation status
- Least Concern (IUCN 3.1)

Scientific classification
- Kingdom: Animalia
- Phylum: Chordata
- Class: Aves
- Order: Passeriformes
- Family: Furnariidae
- Genus: Synallaxis
- Species: S. castanea

Binomial name
- Synallaxis castanea Sclater, PL, 1856

= Black-throated spinetail =

Species of bird

The black-throated spinetail (Synallaxis castanea) is a species of bird in the Furnariinae subfamily of the ovenbird family Furnariidae. It is endemic to Venezuela.

== Taxonomy and systematics ==
For a period in the mid twentieth century the black-throated spinetail was treated as a subspecies of the rufous spinetail (S. unirufa); they are now known to be sister species. The two of them and the rusty-headed spinetail (S. fuscorufa) have been treated by some authors as a single species.

The black-throated spinetail is monotypic.

== Description ==
The black-throated spinetail is 16 to 18 cm (6.3 to 7.1 in) long. It is one of the larger members of genus Synallaxis. The sexes have the same plumage. Adults are mostly bright rufescent. They do have a paler chin and the eponymous solid black throat. Their iris is dark reddish brown, their bill blackish, and their legs and feet blue-gray. Juveniles are duller and browner than adults, with a dull and indistinct throat patch and faint dusky markings on the head and underparts.

== Distribution and habitat ==
The black-throated spinetail is found only in the Venezuelan Coastal Range from Aragua east to the vicinity of Caracas in Miranda. It inhabits montane evergreen forest, secondary forest, and the undergrowth and edges of cloudforest. It is often seen along brushy roadsides and occasionally in stands of Chusquea bamboo. In elevation it ranges between 1,300 and 2,200 m (4,300 and 7,200 ft).

== Behavior ==
=== Movement ===
The black-throated spinetail is a year-round resident throughout its range.

=== Feeding ===
The black-throated spinetail's diet is not known in detail but is assumed to be mostly arthropods. It usually forages in pairs and is thought to glean prey from foliage and small branches up to about 2 m (7 ft) above the ground.

=== Breeding ===
The black-throated spinetail breeds between April and July. Nothing else is known about its breeding biology.

=== Vocalization ===
The black-throated spinetail's song is "a rapid 'ke-che-che-che-che-che' followed immediately by louder 'ker-chéé-chéé' " and is often sung in duet. Its call is "a loud 'ki-kík' ".

== Status ==
The IUCN has assessed the black-throated spinetail as being of Least Concern. It has a small range; its estimated population of 2500 to 10,000 mature individuals is believed to be stable. No immediate threats have been identified. It is considered fairly common and occurs in two national parks.
