= Neostrengeria =

Scientific classification
- Domain: Eukaryota
- Kingdom: Animalia
- Phylum: Arthropoda
- Class: Malacostraca
- Order: Decapoda
- Suborder: Pleocyemata
- Infraorder: Brachyura
- Family: Pseudothelphusidae
- Genus: Neostrengeria; Pretzmann, 1965

Genus of crabs

Neostrengeria is a genus of crabs in the family Pseudothelphusidae, containing the following species:

- Neostrengeria alexae Campos, 2010
- Neostrengeria appressa Campos, 1992
- Neostrengeria aspera Campos, 1992
- Neostrengeria bataensis Campos & Pedraza, 2008
- Neostrengeria binderi Campos, 2000
- Neostrengeria botti Rodríguez & Türkay, 1978
- Neostrengeria boyacensis Rodríguez, 1980
- Neostrengeria celioi Campos & Pedraza, 2008
- Neostrengeria charalensis Campos & Rodríguez, 1985
- Neostrengeria fernandezi Campos, 2017
- Neostrengeria gilberti Campos, 1992
- Neostrengeria guenteri (Pretzmann, 1965)
- Neostrengeria lasallei Rodríguez, 1980
- Neostrengeria lassoi Campos, 2017
- Neostrengeria lemaitrei Campos, 2004
- Neostrengeria libradensis Rodríguez, 1980
- Neostrengeria lindigiana (Rathbun, 1897)
- Neostrengeria lobulata Campos, 1992
- Neostrengeria macarenae Campos, 1992
- Neostrengeria macropa (H. Milne-Edwards, 1853)
- Neostrengeria monterrodendoensis (Bott, 1967)
- Neostrengeria natashae Campos, 2011
- Neostrengeria niceforoi (Schmitt, 1969)
- Neostrengeria perijaensis Campos & Lemaitre, 1998
- Neostrengeria sketi Rodríguez, 1985
- Neostrengeria tencalanensis Campos, 1992
- Neostrengeria tonensis Campos, 1992
