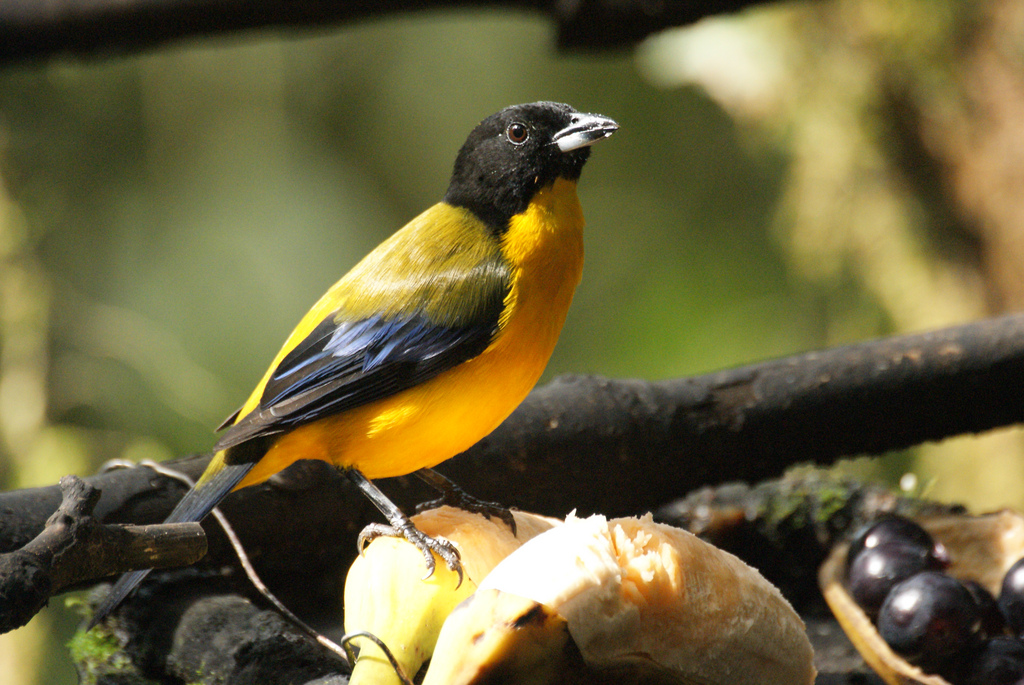
- In Ecuador

Conservation status
- Least Concern (IUCN 3.1)

Scientific classification
- Kingdom: Animalia
- Phylum: Chordata
- Class: Aves
- Order: Passeriformes
- Family: Thraupidae
- Genus: Anisognathus
- Species: A. notabilis

Binomial name
- Anisognathus notabilis (Sclater, PL, 1855)

= Black-chinned mountain tanager =

Species of bird

The black-chinned mountain tanager (Anisognathus notabilis) is a species of bird in the family Thraupidae. It is found in Colombia and Ecuador. Its natural habitat is subtropical or tropical moist montane forests.
