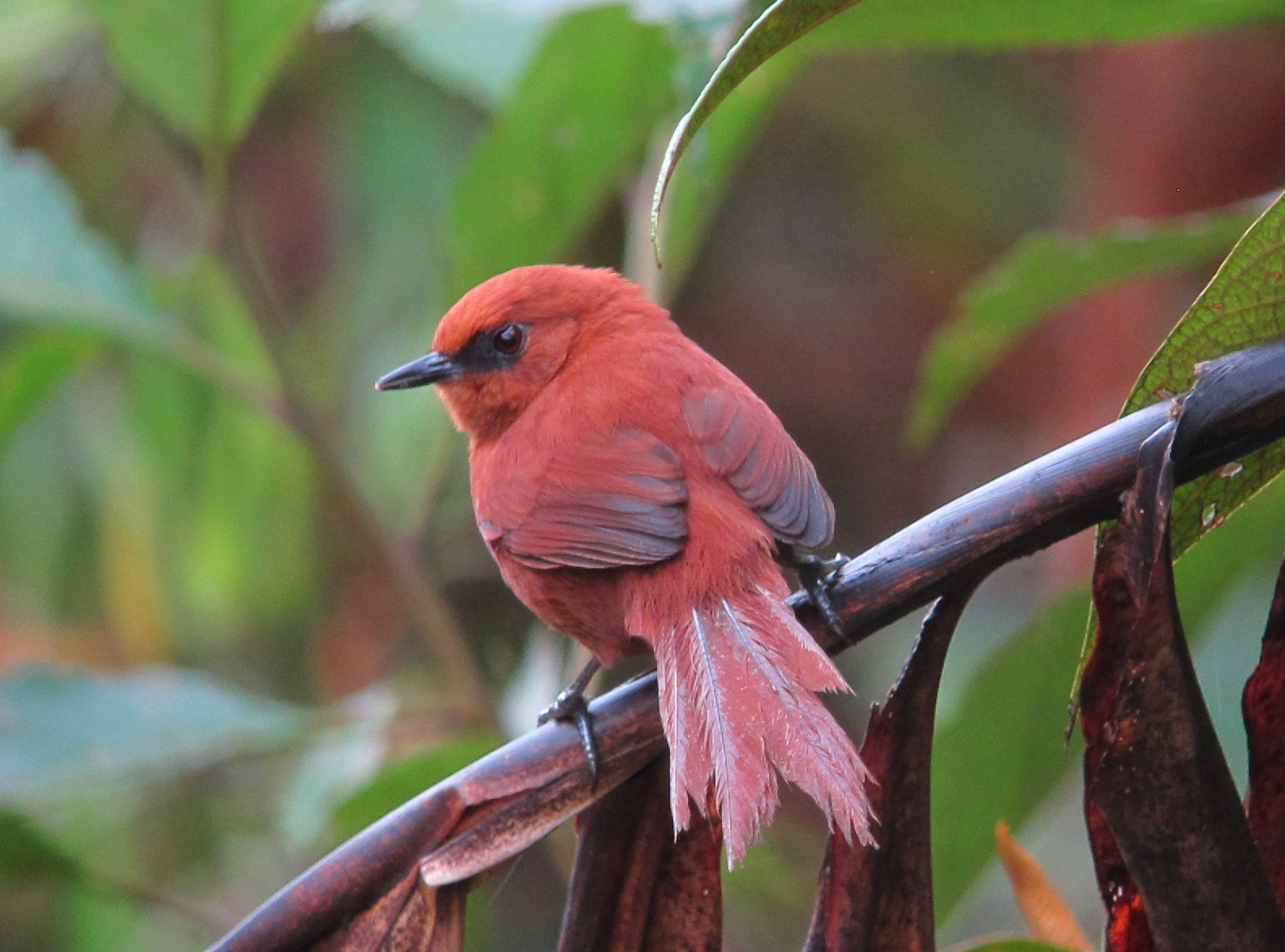

Conservation status
- Least Concern (IUCN 3.1)

Scientific classification
- Kingdom: Animalia
- Phylum: Chordata
- Class: Aves
- Order: Passeriformes
- Family: Furnariidae
- Genus: Synallaxis
- Species: S. unirufa

Binomial name
- Synallaxis unirufa Lafresnaye, 1843

= Rufous spinetail =

Species of bird

The rufous spinetail (Synallaxis unirufa) is a species of bird in the Furnariinae subfamily of the ovenbird family Furnariidae. It is found in Colombia, Ecuador, Peru, and Venezuela.

== Taxonomy and systematics ==
The rufous spinetail has these four subspecies:

- S. u. munoztebari Phelps, WH & Phelps, WH Jr, 1953
- S. u. meridana Hartert, EJO & Goodson, 1917
- S. u. unirufa Lafresnaye, 1843
- S. u. ochrogaster Zimmer, JT, 1935

For a period in the mid twentieth century the black-throated spinetail (S. castanea) was treated as another subspecies of the rufous spinetail; they are now known to be sister species. The rufous spinetail, black-throated spinetail, and rusty-headed spinetail (S. fuscorufa) were treated by some authors as a single species.

== Description ==
The rufous spinetail is 16 to 18 cm (6.3 to 7.1 in) long and weighs 17 to 21 g (0.60 to 0.74 oz). It is one of the larger members of genus Synallaxis. The sexes have the same plumage. Adults of the nominate subspecies S. u. unirufa are mostly bright reddish rufous. Their forehead is slightly paler and they have sooty blackish lores. Their throat feathers have black bases that are seldom visible. Their iris is dark brown to dark reddish brown, their bill black with sometimes a pale base to the mandible, and their legs and feet gray to dark gray. Juveniles have brown upperparts, sometimes an olivaceous tinge to the head, and paler underparts than adults.

Subspecies S. u. munoztebari of the rufous spinetail is paler than the nominate, with a faint buff supercilium and forehead and no black on the throat feathers. Subspecies S. u. meridana is paler than the nominate, with somewhat visible black bases to the throat feathers. S. u. ochrogaster has the palest underparts of all four subspecies, especially in the center of its belly.

== Distribution and habitat ==
The rufous spinetail has a disjunct distribution. The nominate subspecies is by far the most widely distributed. It is found in all three ranges of the Colombian Andes, on the west slope of Ecuador's Andes as far south as Cotopaxi Province, and on the east slope through Ecuador into extreme northern Peru north of the Marañón River. Subspecies S. u. munoztebari is found in the Serranía del Perijá that straddles the border between northeastern Colombia and northwestern Venezuela. S. u. meridana is found in the Andes of western Venezuela between Trujillo and Táchira and the far northwestern part of Colombia's Eastern Andes.S. u. ochrogaster is found in the Peruvian Andes south of the Marañón River between the departments of Amazonas and Cuzco.

The rufous spinetail inhabits montane evergreen forest, elfin forest, and the undergrowth and edges of cloudforest in the Andes' subtropical and temperate zones. It tends to prefer the forest undergrowth and favors stands of Chusquea bamboo. In elevation it overall mostly ranges between 1,700 and 3,700 m (5,600 and 12,100 ft) and is found locally as low as 1,200 m (3,900 ft). It has narrower elevational ranges of 2,000 and 3,300 m (6,600 and 10,800 ft) in Colombia and 2,200 and 3,200 m (7,200 and 10,500 ft) in Ecuador.

== Behavior ==
=== Movement ===
The rufous spinetail is a year-round resident throughout its range.

=== Feeding ===
The rufous spinetail feeds on arthropods. It usually forages in pairs and occasionally joins mixed-species feeding flocks. It gleans prey from foliage and small branches in dense cover, usually up to about 2 m (7 ft) above the ground but occasionally as high as 4 m (13 ft).

=== Breeding ===
The rufous spinetail's breeding season is unknown; the only data point is an observation of fledglings in April in Colombia. The species is thought to be monogamous but nothing else is known about its breeding biology.

=== Vocalization ===
The subspecies of the rufous spinetail have significantly different vocalizations, which hints that some of them may warrant full species status. "An in depth study is clearly required to gain a better understanding of the taxonomic relationships in this complex."

The details of the subspecies' vocalizations are:

- S. u. munoztebari: Song is a "series of 2, occasionally 3 notes, the first much shorter". Calls include a "very short, upward inflected note pit!" that is sometimes doubled and a much rarer "long series of identical upslurred notes".
- S. u. meridana: Primary song is a "series of 2 or 3 almost identical nasal notes, the first one slightly shorter than the second and third". Alternate song ("dawn song") is a "series of 2 or 3 notes that are longer than in primary song and second note often disyllabic [and song] may also end with a short rattle". Call is a "very short, upward inflected note kit".
- S. u. unirufa: Primary song is a "single long nasal note, often preceded by one (occasionally two) short introductory notes". Alternate song is "[o]ne or two long rising notes, the second higher-pitched than the first". Call is sometimes doubled, a "short note chik".
- S. u. ochrogaster: Primary song is a "single note, occasionally preceded by a short introductory note". Alternate song is a "rising series of 2-4 notes". Call is sometimes doubled, a "short note chik".

All four subspecies repeat their primary (or only) song for long periods at intervals of about one to two seconds. The species sings at any time of day but mostly in the morning. It usually sings from dense cover.

== Status ==
The IUCN has assessed the rufous spinetail as being of Least Concern. It has a very large range, and though its population size is not known it is believed to be stable. No immediate threats have been identified. It varies from uncommon to common across its range and occurs in several protected areas. Despite its wide distribution it is "rather poorly known".
