= Neostrengeria lindigiana =

Conservation status
- Least Concern (IUCN 3.1)

Scientific classification
- Kingdom: Animalia
- Phylum: Arthropoda
- Clade: Pancrustacea
- Class: Malacostraca
- Order: Decapoda
- Suborder: Pleocyemata
- Infraorder: Brachyura
- Family: Pseudothelphusidae
- Genus: Neostrengeria
- Species: N. lindigiana

Binomial name
- Neostrengeria lindigiana (Rathbun, 1897)

Species of crab

Neostrengeria lindigiana is a species of crab in the family Pseudothelphusidae. The International Union for Conservation of Nature assessed the species in 2008 and listed it in their category of least concern. They are extant in regions of central Colombia.
