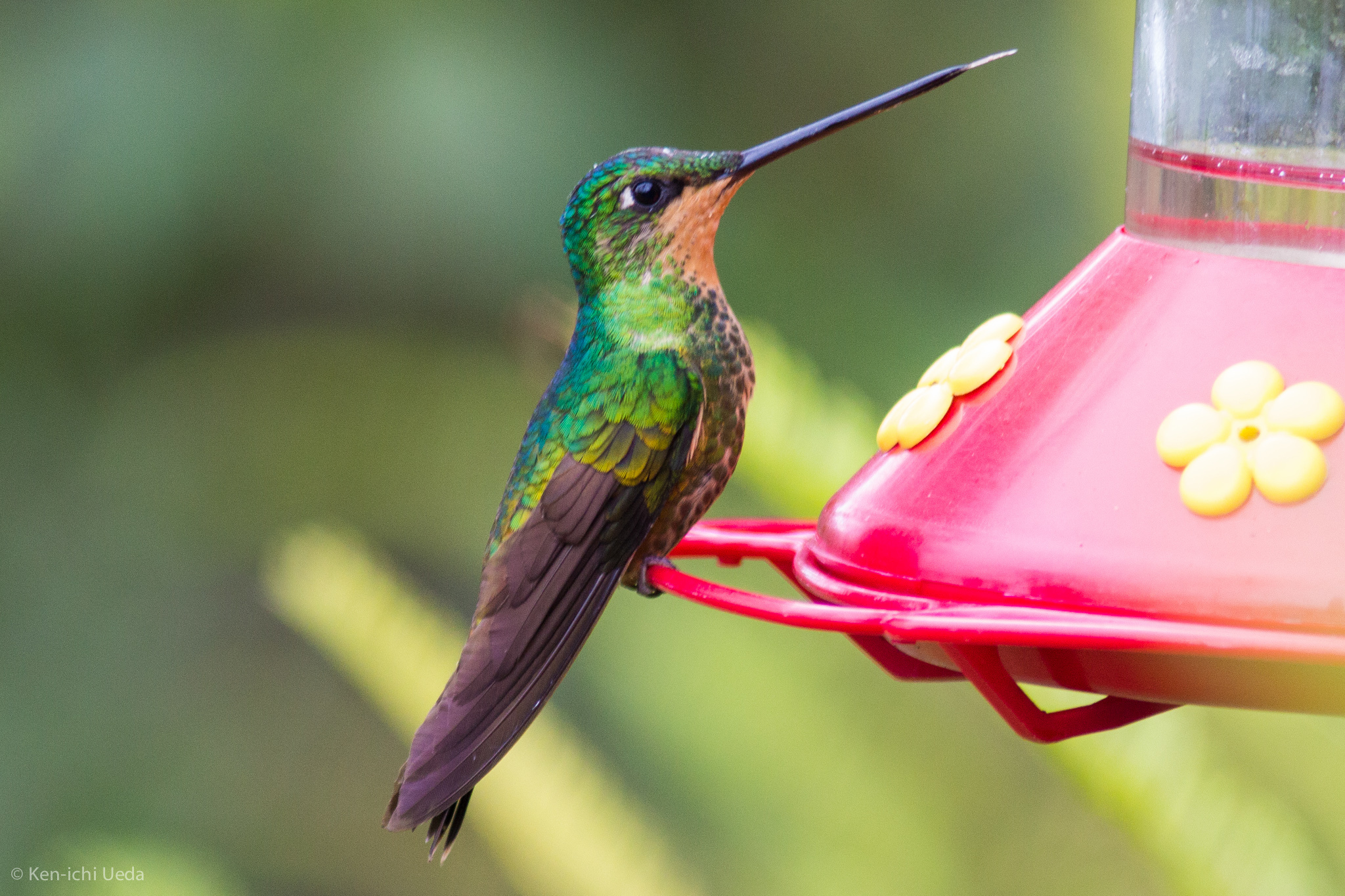
- Female

Conservation status
- Least Concern (IUCN 3.1)
- CITES Appendix II

Scientific classification
- Kingdom: Animalia
- Phylum: Chordata
- Class: Aves
- Order: Apodiformes
- Family: Trochilidae
- Genus: Coeligena
- Species: C. bonapartei

Binomial name
- Coeligena bonapartei (Boissonneau, 1840)

Synonyms
- Helianthea bonapartei

= Golden-bellied starfrontlet =

Species of hummingbird

The golden-bellied starfrontlet (Coeligena bonapartei) is a species of hummingbird in the "brilliants", tribe Heliantheini in subfamily Lesbiinae. It is endemic to Colombia.

== Taxonomy and systematics ==
The golden-bellied starfrontlet and most other members of genus Coeligena were at one time placed in genus Helianthea but have been in their current placement since the mid-1900s.

The International Ornithological Committee (IOC), the Clements taxonomy, and BirdLife International's Handbook of the Birds of the World recognize the golden-bellied starfrontlet as a monotypic species separate from the Perija starfrontlet (C. consita) and golden-tailed starfrontlet (C. eso). The South American Classification Committee of the American Ornithological Society treats those three as subspecies of the golden-bellied starfrontlet sensu lato but is seeking proposals to elevate all three to species status.

The golden-bellied starfrontlet's specific epithet commemorates Charles Lucien Bonaparte.

== Description ==
The golden-bellied starfrontlet is about 10.9 cm (4.3 in) long including its 3.0 cm (1.2 in) bill. Males weigh an average of 6.6 g (0.23 oz) and females 6.4 g (0.23 oz). Both sexes have a white spot behind the eye. Males have a blackish crown with a glittering green forehead. Their upper back is shining dark green that transitions through greenish copper to the golden orange rump. The throat and breast are glittering green and the throat has a small violet patch. The rest of the underparts are variable, from glittering copper to reddish gold. The slightly forked tail is golden bronzy green. The female's forehead is plain green; the rest of the upperparts are colored like the male's but are duller. The throat is plain buff and has green spots on its sides. The breast is mottled buff and green. The rest of the underparts are mostly cinnamon with a reddish gold belly and a coppery gold vent area. The tail feathers are bronze and sometimes have buff tips.

== Distribution and habitat ==
The golden-bellied starfrontlet is found in the Eastern Andes of Colombia between Boyacá Department and the Metropolitan Area of Bogotá.

The species primarily inhabits the interior and edges of humid montane forest. It also occurs in dwarf forest and more open landscapes with scattered vegetation. In elevation it ranges from 1,400 to 3,200 m (4,600 to 10,500 ft).

== Behavior ==
=== Movement ===
The golden-bellied starfrontlet is a year-round resident.

=== Feeding ===
The golden-bellied starfrontlet gathers nectar from tubular flowers, usually at low to medium heights. It primarily feeds by trap-lining, visiting a circuit of flowering plants. In addition to feeding on nectar it captures small arthropods by gleaning from foliage, hovering, and by hawking.

=== Breeding ===
The golden-bellied starfrontlet's breeding season is not known in detail but appears to span from January to possibly July. Its nest, eggs, incubation length, and time to fledging have not been described.

=== Vocalization ===
Few recordings of the golden-bellied starfrontlet are available. Its vocalizations are known to include "a short twitter and a more complex chatter that rises and falls in pitch."

== Status ==
The IUCN has assessed the golden-bellied starfrontlet as being of Least Concern. It has a small range and an unknown population size that is believed to be decreasing. No immediate threats have been identified. "The distribution coincides with areas of new human settlements and areas of interest for minerals exploitation, and it does not occur in any protected areas."
