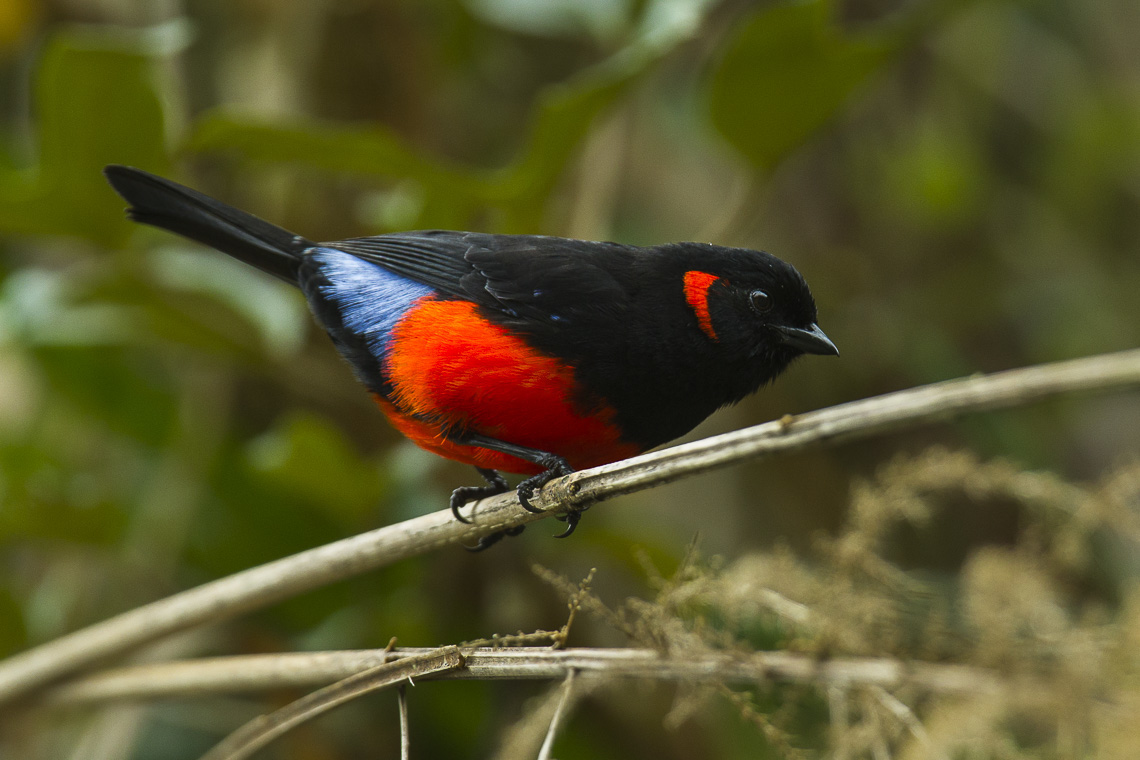

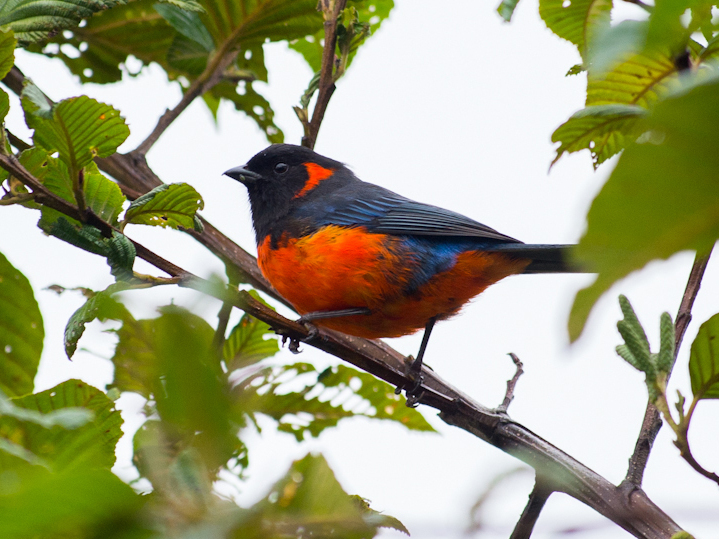
- Scarlet-bellied mountain tanager in Ecuador (above), fire-bellied mountain tanager in Puno, Peru (below)

Conservation status
- Least Concern (IUCN 3.1)

Scientific classification
- Kingdom: Animalia
- Phylum: Chordata
- Class: Aves
- Order: Passeriformes
- Family: Thraupidae
- Genus: Anisognathus
- Species: A. igniventris

Binomial name
- Anisognathus igniventris (d'Orbigny & Lafresnaye, 1837)

= Scarlet-bellied mountain tanager =

Species of bird

Anisognathus igniventris - Scarlet-bellied Mountain Tanager

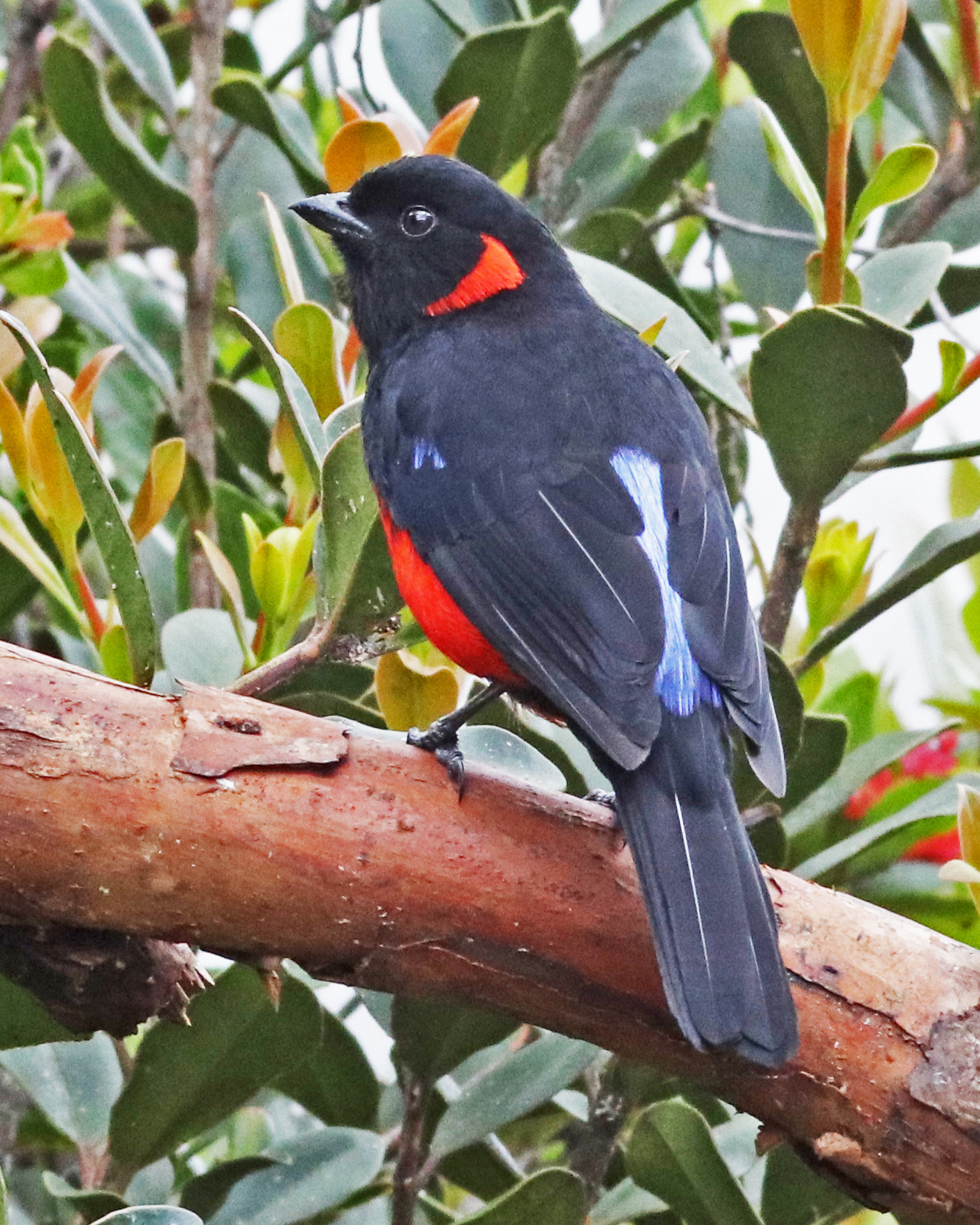
Scarlet-bellied mountain-tanager in Yanacocha Ecuador

The scarlet-bellied mountain tanager (Anisognathus igniventris) is a species of bird in the family Thraupidae. It is found in Andean forest, woodland and shrub in Bolivia, Colombia, Ecuador, Peru, and Venezuela. It is sometimes split into two species: The scarlet-bellied mountain tanager (A. lunulatus) ranging north from central Peru, and the fire-bellied mountain tanager (A. igniventris) ranging south from central Peru. The latter has a lighter, more orangish belly than the former.
