= Neostrengeria perijaensis =

Conservation status
- Near Threatened (IUCN 3.1)

Scientific classification
- Domain: Eukaryota
- Kingdom: Animalia
- Phylum: Arthropoda
- Class: Malacostraca
- Order: Decapoda
- Suborder: Pleocyemata
- Infraorder: Brachyura
- Family: Pseudothelphusidae
- Genus: Neostrengeria
- Species: N. perijaensis

Binomial name
- Neostrengeria perijaensis Campos & Lemaitre, 1998

Species of crab

Neostrengeria perijaensis is a species of freshwater crab in the family Pseudothelphusidae. It lives in rivers and streams in the Sierra Nevada de Santa Marta, Serranía del Perijá, and northern Cordillera Oriental of Colombia from 1,270 to 1,800 meters elevation.
