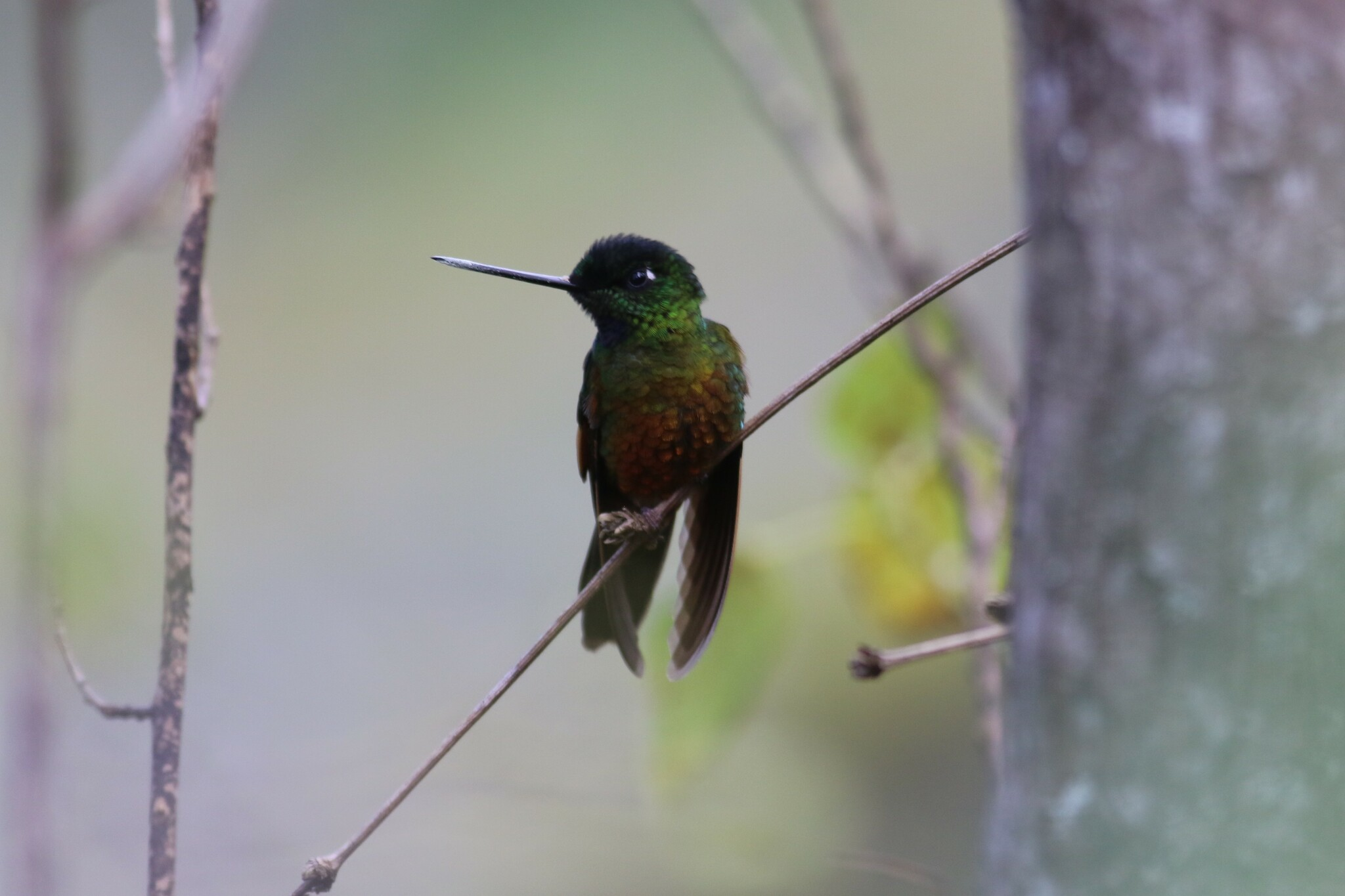

Conservation status
- Endangered (IUCN 3.1)
- CITES Appendix II

Scientific classification
- Kingdom: Animalia
- Phylum: Chordata
- Class: Aves
- Order: Apodiformes
- Family: Trochilidae
- Genus: Coeligena
- Species: C. consita

Binomial name
- Coeligena consita Wetmore & Phelps, WH Jr, 1952

Synonyms
- Coeligena bonapartei consita

= Perija starfrontlet =

Species of hummingbird

The Perija starfrontlet (Coeligena consita) is an Endangered species of hummingbird in the "brilliants", tribe Heliantheini in subfamily Lesbiinae. It is found in Colombia and Venezuela.

== Taxonomy and systematics ==
The Perija starfrontlet and most other members of genus Coeligena were at one time placed in genus Helianthea but have been in their current placement since the mid-1900s. The International Ornithological Committee (IOC), the Clements taxonomy, and BirdLife International's Handbook of the Birds of the World recognize the Perija starfrontlet as a monotypic species. The South American Classification Committee of the American Ornithological Society (SACC) considers it to be a subspecies of the golden-bellied starfrontlet (C. bonapartei) but is seeking a proposal to elevate it to species status.

== Description ==
The Perija starfrontlet is about 11 cm (4.3 in) long including its 3.0 cm (1.2 in) bill. Adult males have a blackish crown, a glittering green forehead, and a small white spot behind the eye. Their upper back is shining dark green that transitions through greenish copper to the golden orange rump. The throat and breast are glittering green and the throat has a small deep blue patch. The rest of the underparts are variable, from glittering copper to reddish gold. The wings are dark with a rufous patch on the tertials. The slightly forked tail is golden bronzy green. The adult female's forehead is plain green and the postocular spot white to buffy orange; the rest of the upperparts are colored like the male's but are duller. The throat is buff and has green spots on its sides. The breast is mottled buff and green. The rest of the underparts are mostly cinnamon with a fiery gold belly and a coppery gold vent area. Juveniles resemble adult females.

== Distribution and habitat ==
The Perija starfrontlet is found in the Serranía del Perijá that straddles the border between northeastern Colombia and northwestern Venezuela. It inhabits the interior and edges of humid forest, elfin forest, and some higher elevation open areas. In elevation it ranges from 1,400 to 3,200 m (4,600 to 10,500 ft).

== Behavior ==
=== Movement ===
The Perija starfrontlet is a permanent resident.

=== Feeding ===
The Perija starfrontlet gathers nectar from tubular flowers, usually of low to medium height. It has been recorded feeding from plants of genera Bomarea, Cavendishia, Fuchsia, Macleonia, Mutisia, and Palicourea. In addition to feeding on nectar it captures small arthropods by gleaning from foliage, hovering, and by hawking.

=== Breeding ===
Nothing is known about the Perija starfrontlet's breeding biology.

=== Vocalization ===
As of early 2023 neither xeno-canto nor the Cornell Lab of Ornithology's Macaulay Library had any recordings of the Perija starfrontlet's vocalizations.

== Status ==
The IUCN has assessed the Perija starfrontlet as Endangered. Its population is estimated at between 250 and 1000 mature individuals and is decreasing. Its habitat has been depleted and fragmented by clearing for colonization, ranching, mining, and illegal poppy cultivation.
