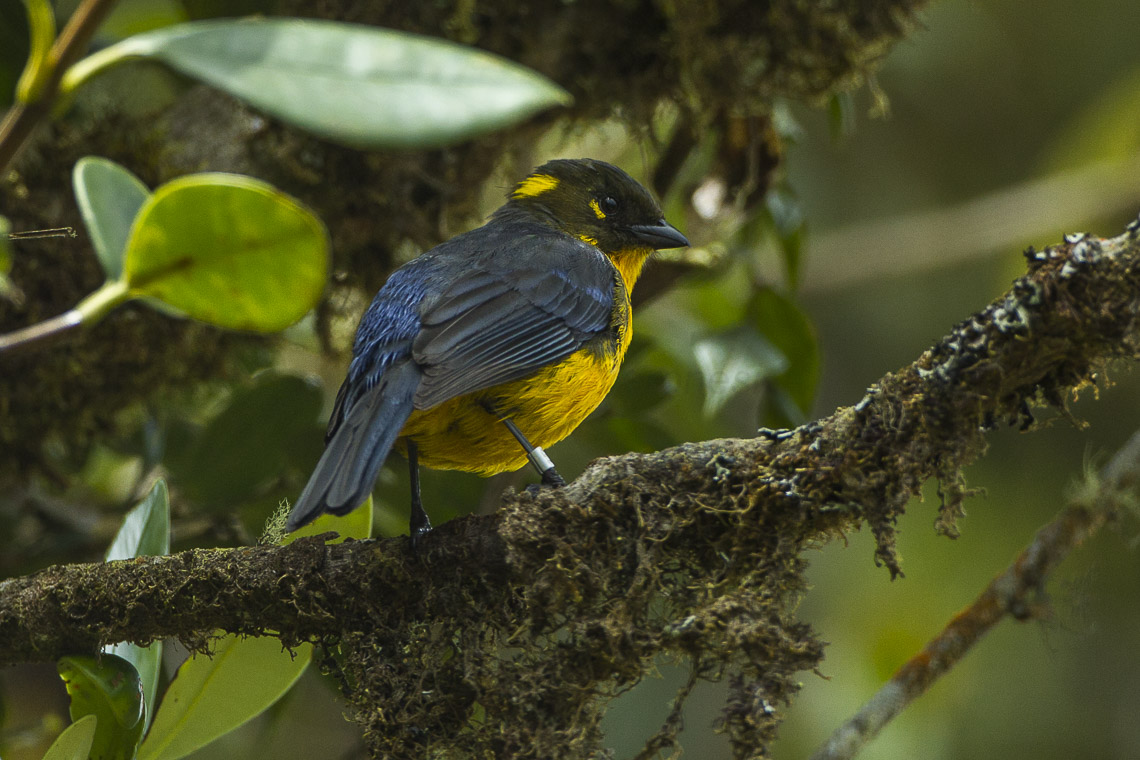
- At Manizales, Colombia
- Anisognathus lacrymosus - Lacrimose Mountain Tanager (song)

Conservation status
- Least Concern (IUCN 3.1)

Scientific classification
- Kingdom: Animalia
- Phylum: Chordata
- Class: Aves
- Order: Passeriformes
- Family: Thraupidae
- Genus: Anisognathus
- Species: A. lacrymosus

Binomial name
- Anisognathus lacrymosus (Du Bus de Gisignies, 1846)

= Lacrimose mountain tanager =

Species of bird

The lacrimose mountain tanager (Anisognathus lacrymosus) is a species of bird in the family Thraupidae. It is found in Andean highland forest from Venezuela, through Colombia and Ecuador, to Peru. Some of its 11 subspecies are quite distinctive and A. l. yariguierum was only scientifically described in 2010.

The bird is named Lacrimose (i.e. crying) for the yellow patch below the eye that suggests tears.

== Gallery ==
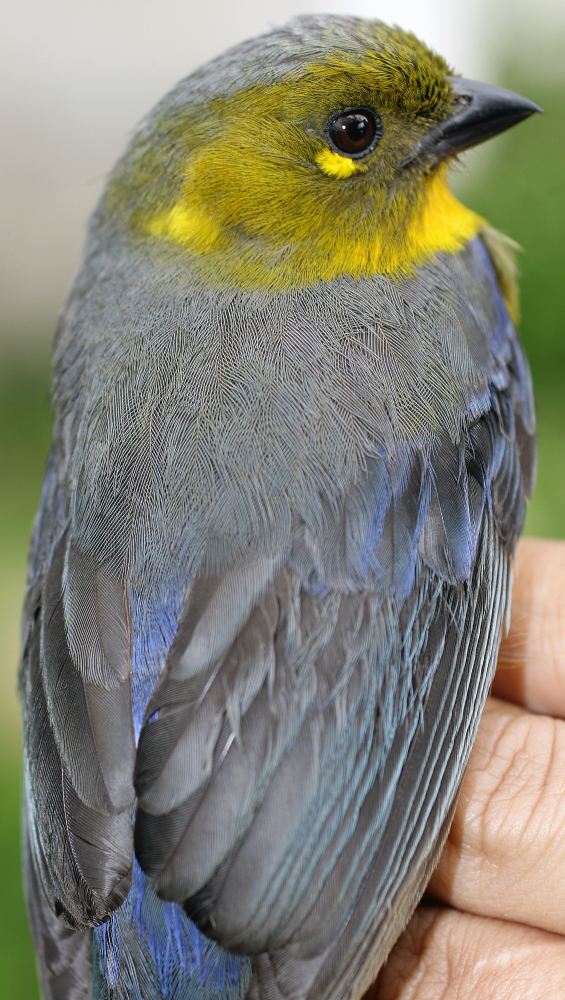
A. l. pallididorsalis is a pale subspecies from the Perijá Mountains

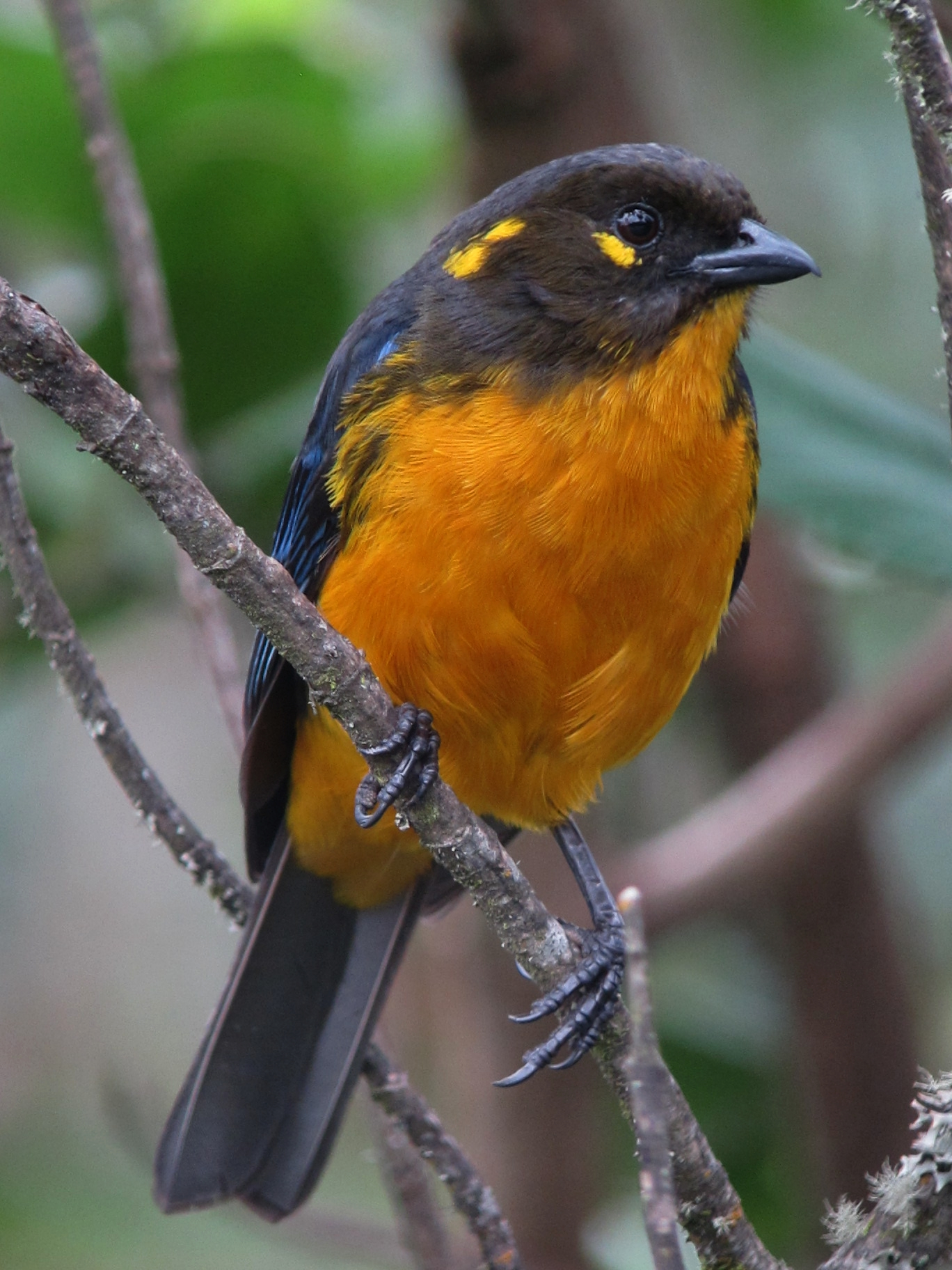
A. l. intensus of the Cordillera Oriental (Colombia)
