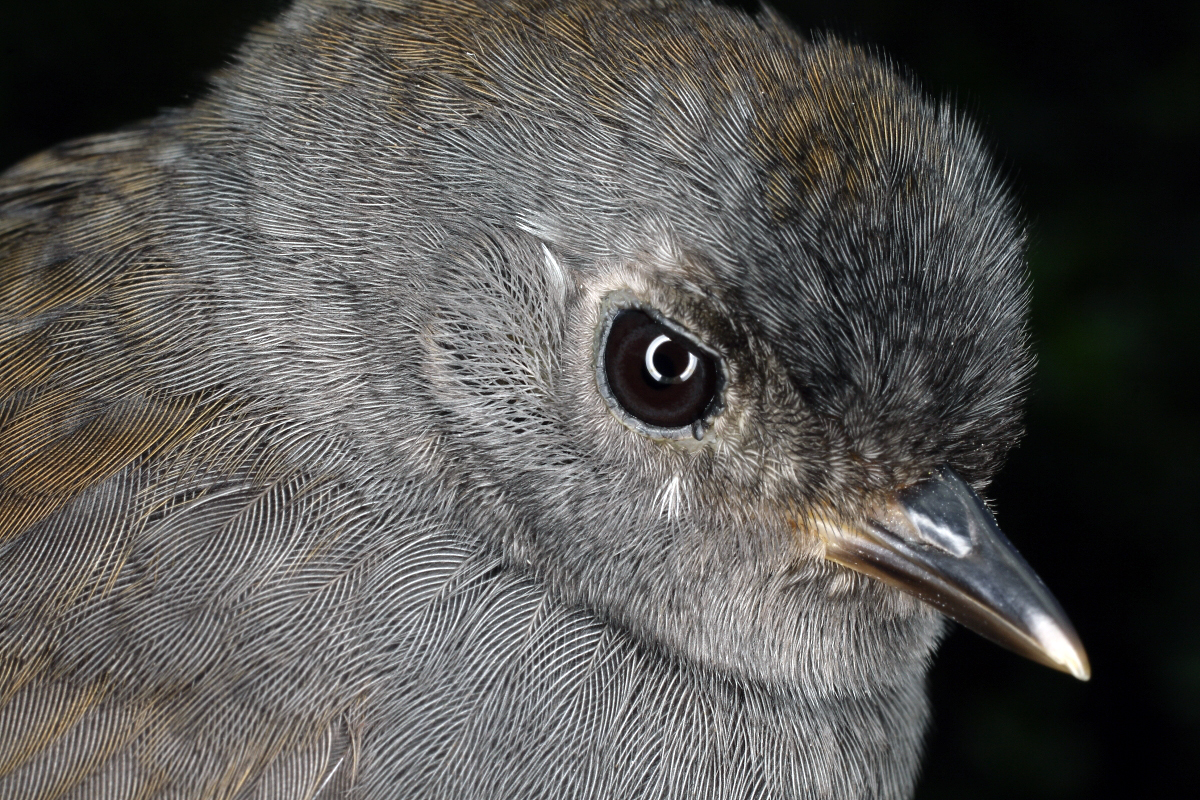

Conservation status
- Least Concern (IUCN 3.1)

Scientific classification
- Kingdom: Animalia
- Phylum: Chordata
- Class: Aves
- Order: Passeriformes
- Family: Rhinocryptidae
- Genus: Scytalopus
- Species: S. griseicollis

Binomial name
- Scytalopus griseicollis (Lafresnaye, 1840)

= Pale-bellied tapaculo =

Species of bird

The pale-bellied tapaculo (Scytalopus griseicollis), also known as the matorral tapaculo or rufous-rumped tapaculo, is a species of bird in the family Rhinocryptidae. It is found in Colombia and Venezuela.

== Taxonomy and systematics ==
The pale-bellied tapaculo has three recognized subspecies, the nominate Scytalopus griseicollis griseicollis, S. griseicollis gilesi, and S. griseicollis morenoi. The last of these was not described until 2015. Pale-bellied tapaculo was formerly considered a subspecies of Magellanic tapaculo (S. magellanicus). The putative Scytalopus infasciatus has been variously proposed as a subspecies of pale-bellied or brown-rumped (S. latebricola) tapaculos, as a synonym for Merida tapaculo (S. meridanus), and as a species in its own right ("Cundinamarca tapaculo"). As of 2021, it is considered "inseparable from the nominate" pale-bellied.

== Description ==
The pale-bellied tapaculo is 10 to 11.5 cm (3.9 to 4.5 in) long. The nominate subspecies weighs 16.6 to 19.3 g (0.59 to 0.68 oz). One male S. g. morenoi weighed 17 g (0.60 oz) and two male S. g. gilesi 17.5 and 18 g (0.62 and 0.63 oz). The nominate adult is mostly gray, lighter on the underside. Its back and wings are brownish gray. The rump, flanks, and vent are orange-brown. S. g. gelesi has a darker back with less brown and darker (slate gray) underparts. S. g. morenoi has a brown mantle.

== Distribution and habitat ==
The pale-bellied tapaculo inhabits the Eastern Andes of Colombia. The nominate is found in Cundinamarca and Boyacá Departments. S. g. gilesi is found in Santander Department, northeast of the nominate. S. g. morenoi is found in northern Santander Department, Norte de Santander Department, and slightly into adjacent Venezuela. It inhabits low scrub in elfin forest and páramo at elevations of 2,000 to 3,900 m (6,600 to 12,800 ft). It is also, but rarely, found in montane and oak forest. Locally it can be found in Chusquea bamboo stands, and it appears to tolerate disturbed and fragmented habitat.

== Behavior ==
=== Feeding ===
The pale-bellied tapaculo is assumed to be insectivorous but few details of its diet or foraging phenology are known.

=== Breeding ===
The pale-bellied tapaculo's breeding phenology is also very poorly known. An adult S. g. morenoi was in breeding condition when collected in August and fledglings of that subspecies were collected in April, June, and September. Fledglings of S. g. gelesi were collected between June and December.

=== Vocalization ===
The songs of pale-bellied tapaculo subspecies differ somewhat, but all are a trill, sometimes preceded by a single note . The scold call is also a trill .

== Status ==
The IUCN has assessed the pale-bellied tapaculo as being of Least Concern. However, S. g. gelesi has a limited range and the habitat of S. g. morenoi is very badly fragmented and degraded.
