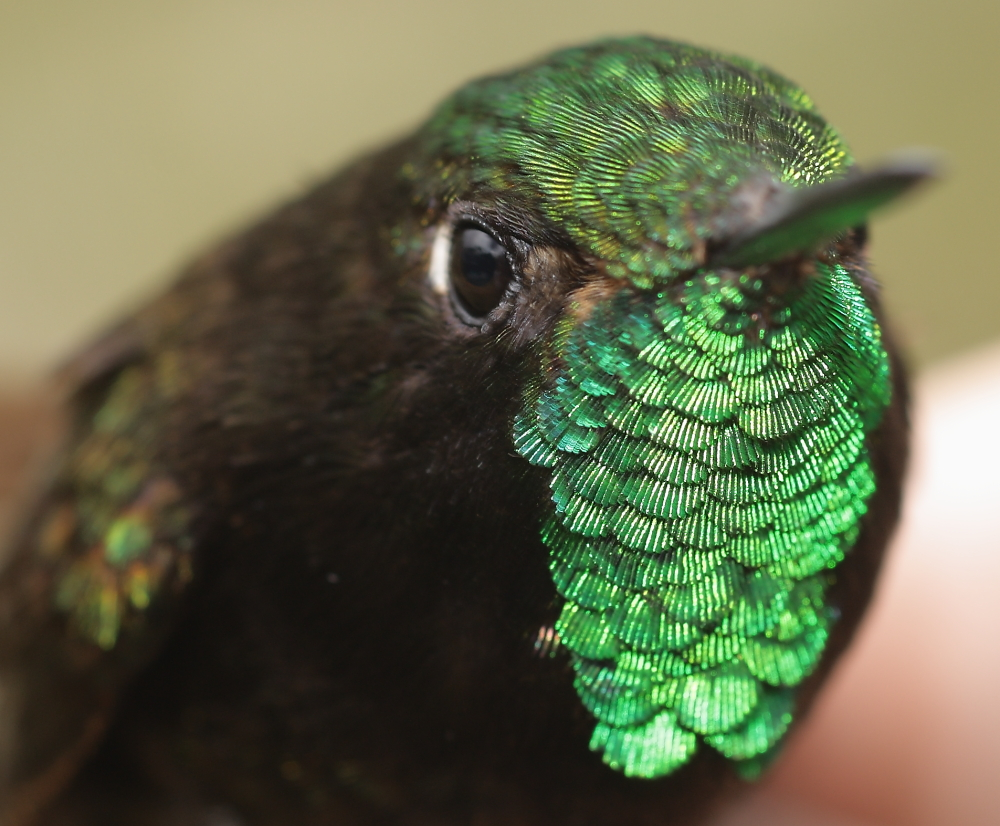

Conservation status
- Near Threatened (IUCN 3.1)
- CITES Appendix II

Scientific classification
- Kingdom: Animalia
- Phylum: Chordata
- Class: Aves
- Clade: Strisores
- Order: Apodiformes
- Family: Trochilidae
- Genus: Metallura
- Species: M. iracunda

Binomial name
- Metallura iracunda Wetmore, 1946

= Perijá metaltail =

Species of hummingbird

The Perijá metaltail (Metallura iracunda) is a Near Threatened species of hummingbird in the "coquettes", tribe Lesbiini of subfamily Lesbiinae. It is found in Colombia and Venezuela.

== Taxonomy and systematics ==
The Perijá metaltail is monotypic. It is closely related to the Tyrian metaltail (M. tyrianthina) and is sympatric with one of its subspecies.

== Description ==
The Perijá metaltail is 10 to 11 cm (3.9 to 4.3 in) long and weighs 3.6 to 4.1 g (0.13 to 0.14 oz). It has a short, straight, black bill. The adult male's upperparts are almost black with a hint of gold; its underparts are dark bronzy green with gold highlights. It has an emerald green gorget and a slightly forked glittering ruby red tail. The adult female is also nearly black above. Its throat and upper breast are ochre-orange with olive green spots and the lower breast and belly are rich buff with green spots. Its outer tail feathers have buffish tips. Juveniles are similar to adult females.

== Distribution and habitat ==
The Perijá metaltail is found in the Serranía del Perijá, which straddles the border between northern Colombia and northwestern Venezuela. It inhabits the varied landscapes of the different peaks within the mountain range, including open bushy terrain, karstic elfin forest, bamboo stands, grassy páramo, and areas of sandstone outcrops. In elevation it ranges between 2,400 and 3,200 m (7,900 and 10,500 ft) in Colombia and as low as 1,850 m (6,100 ft) in Venezuela.

== Behavior ==
The Perijá metaltail is believed to be sedentary. Nothing is known about its diet, foraging behavior, or breeding phenology.

=== Vocalization ===
The Perijá metaltail's vocalizations have not been described, but Xeno-canto and Cornell University's Macaulay Library have a few recordings.

== Status ==
The IUCN originally assessed the Perijá metaltail as Near Threatened. In 2000 it changed the rating to Vulnerable and in 2004 uplisted it to Endangered. As of 2023, it is once again assessed as Near Threatened due its stable population and relatively unaltered habitat. Smuggling, drug cultivation, and mining all contribute to the habitat destruction.
