= Serranía del Perijá =

Mountains in Venezuela

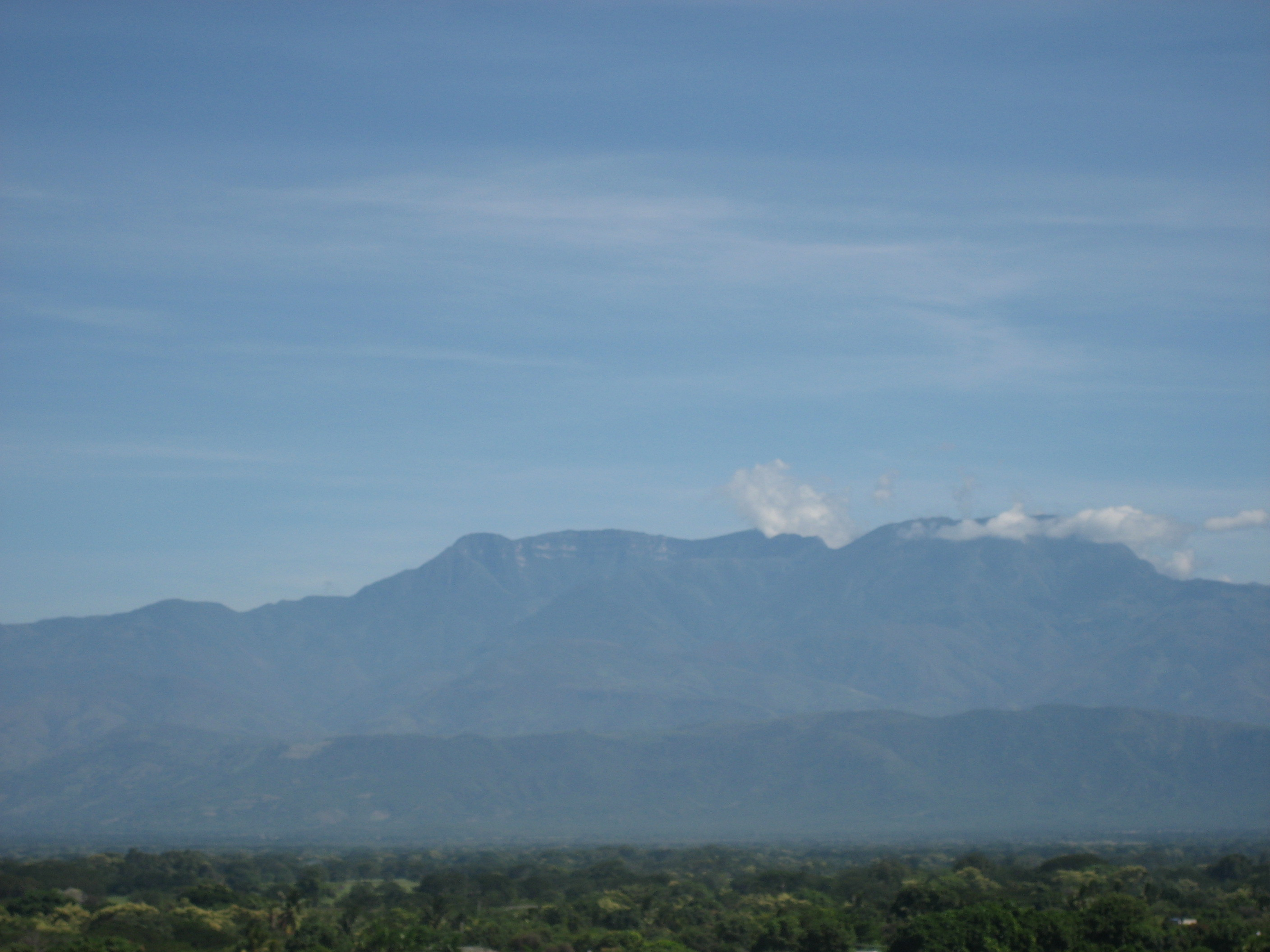
- Cerro Pintao

Highest point
- Peak: Cerro de las Tetas
- Elevation: 3,660 m (12,010 ft)
- Coordinates: 10°0′59″N 72°57′28″W

Dimensions
- Length: 310 km (190 mi)

Geography
- Location within Colombia
- Countries: Colombia; Venezuela
- Region(s): Norte de Santander; Cesar; La Guajira; Zulia

The Serranía del Perijá, Cordillera de Perijá or Sierra de Perijá [pe.ɾi.ˈxa] is a mountain range, an extension of the eastern Andean branch (Cordillera Oriental), in northern South America, between Colombia and Venezuela, ending farther north in the Guajira Desert, a distance of about 310 kilometres (190 mi). It separates the Maracaibo Basin from the Cesar-Ranchería Basin. Some of the area has been considered as a Flora and Fauna Sanctuary.

== Geography ==
Starting at the southernmost point, near Ocaña, Colombia, this mountain range forms the boundary between the Colombian departments of Norte de Santander and Cesar, and then as the range progresses north, it forms the international boundary between Venezuela (Zulia State) and Colombia (Cesar Department). Included in the range are the Sierra Motilones, Sierra Valledupar, and Sierra Oca. The highest point is Cerro de Las Tetas at 3,630 metres (11,910 ft), followed by Cerro Irapa at 3,540 m (11,610 ft), Serranía de Macuira at 864 m (2,835 ft), and Cerro Aceite at 853 m (2,799 ft).

Montane moist forests cover the middle and upper elevations of the range. Plant communities include premontane moist forest with premontane dry forest in drier pockets at lower elevations, montane moist forest at middle elevations, and subalpine moist forest at upper elevations, with areas of high, flat plains, páramo (alpine shrubland), and snow-covered peaks at high elevations. The forests are high in biodiversity with many native species, including endemic and limited range species. Endemic birds include the Perijá metaltail (Metallura iracunda), Perijá brushfinch (Arremon perijanus), Perijá tapaculo (Scytalopus perijanus), Perija starfrontlet (Coeligena consita), Perija antpitta (Grallaria saltuensis), and Perijá thistletail (Asthenes perijana). Other endemic animals include the Perijá lichen gecko (Gonatodes lichenosus), Perija's nurse frog (Aromobates tokuko), and the fish Cordylancistrus perijae. The Perija parakeet (Pyrrhura caeruleiceps), the snake Alemán's snail-eater (Plesiodipsas perijanensis), and the freshwater crab Neostrengeria perijaensis are limited-range species native to both the Serranía la Perijá and the northern Cordillera Oriental.

== Peoples ==
The range is 58% in Venezuela, and 42% in Colombia. Venezuela has set aside a substantial part of the central part of the range as a national park (Sierra de Perijá National Park), and Colombia has a smaller one. In the Venezuelan portion there are Amerindian reservations for the Yucpa and Barí people, and in Colombia for the Iroko and Sokorpa people. Venezuela has started a colonialization border plan building new communities along the border in the Perijá. The town of Cojoro was the first one completed, followed by communities for the Wayuu and Goajira peoples.

== Economy and politics ==
The climate is mostly tropical humid forests, with cultivation of coffee and papaver flowers. It is also a hot spot in the Colombian conflict serving as home to parts of two FARC blocs called the Caribbean Bloc of the FARC-EP and the Middle Magdalena Bloc of the FARC-EP., and an ELN guerrilla column, that have also strayed into Venezuelan territory.
