= Cesar-Ranchería Basin =

Geologic formation in Colombia

- Cuenca Cesar-Ranchería
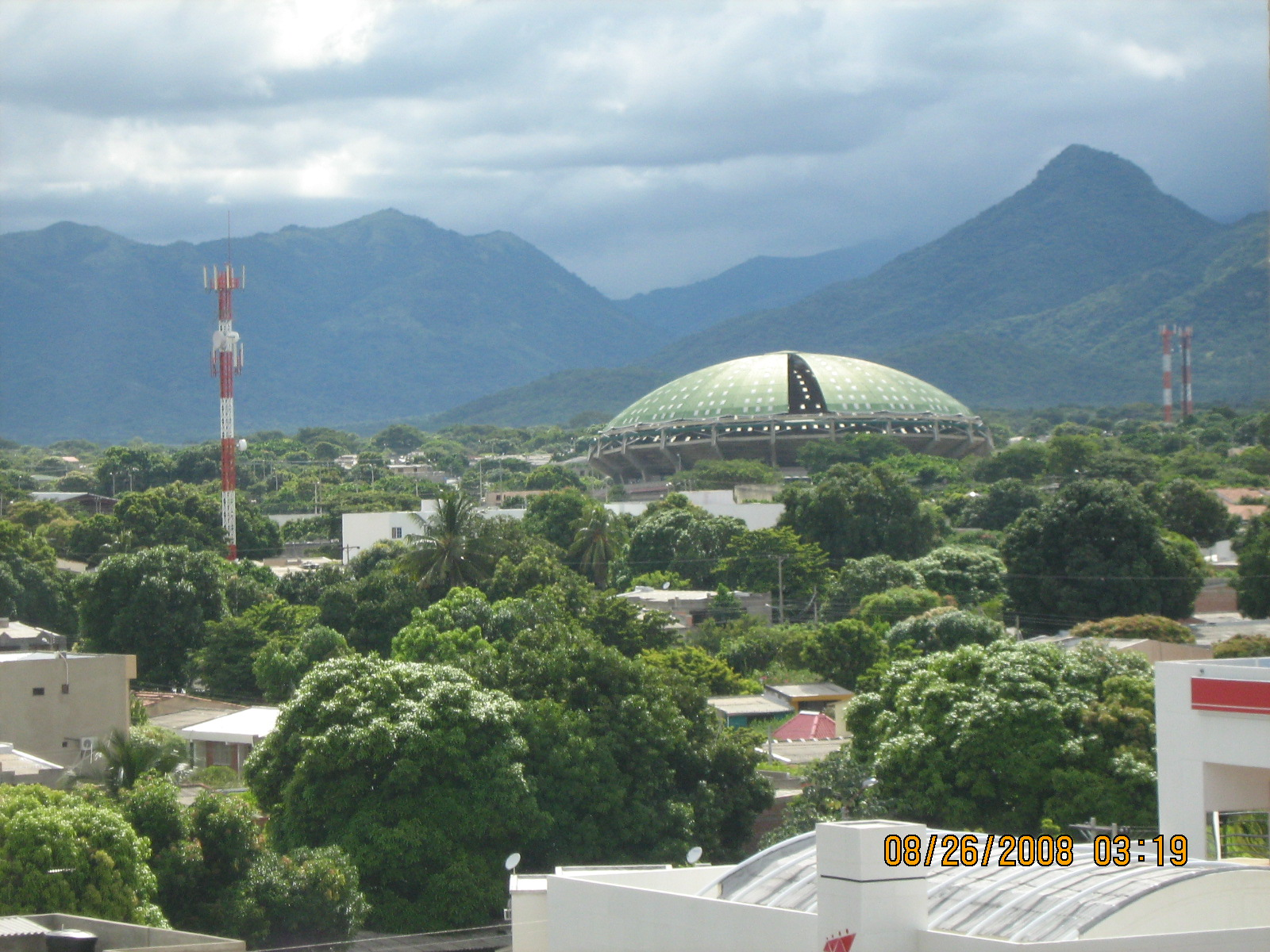
- View of Valledupar in the basin

- Location of the basin in Colombia

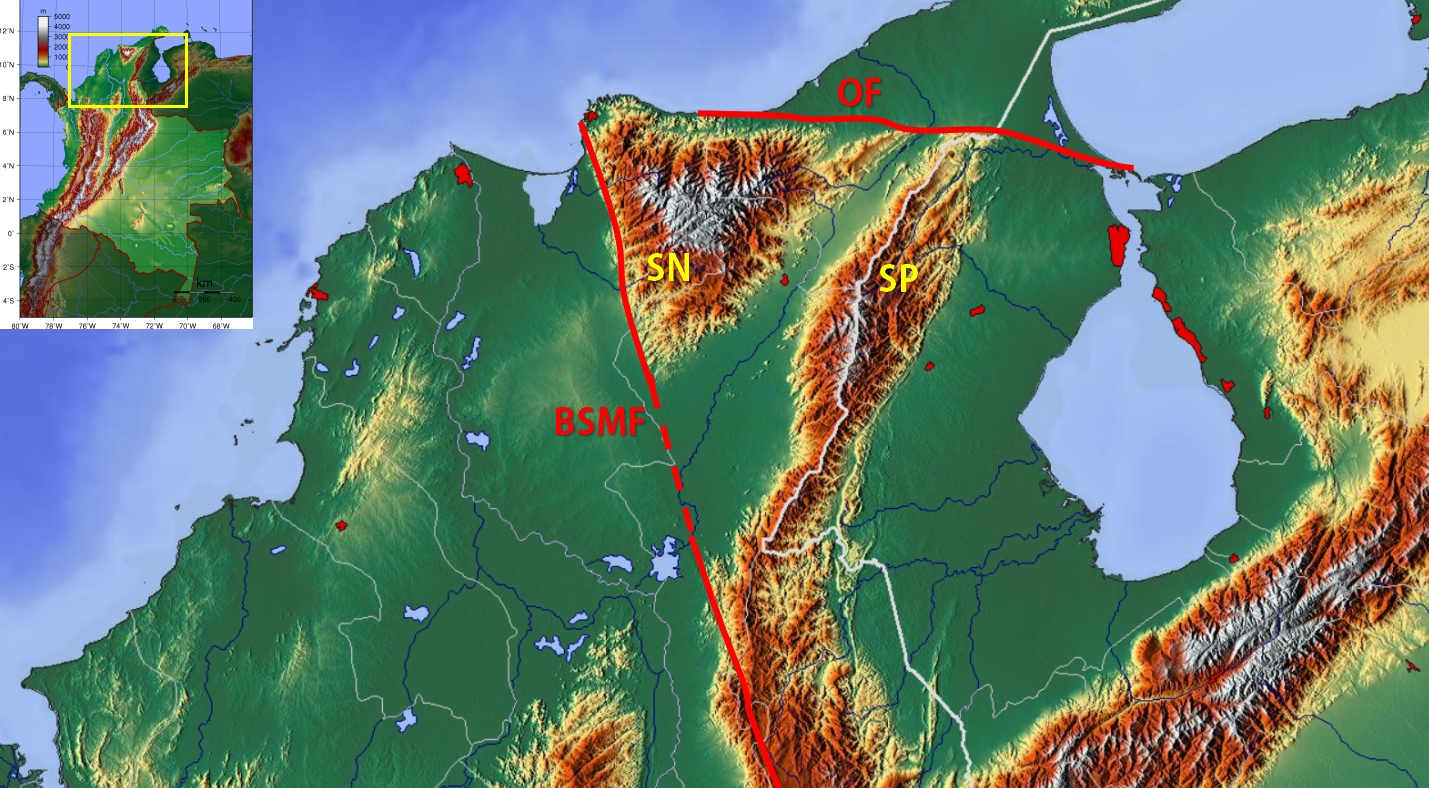
- Outline of the Cesar-Ranchería Basin
- Coordinates: 10°27′N 73°15′W
- Etymology: Cesar & Ranchería Rivers
- Region: Caribbean; Guajira-Barranquilla xeric scrub ecoregion
- Country: Colombia
- States: Cesar, La Guajira
- Cities: Valledupar

Characteristics
- On/Offshore: Onshore
- Boundaries: Sierra Nevada de Santa Marta, Oca Fault, Venezuela, Bucaramanga-Santa Marta Fault
- Part of: Andean foreland basins
- Area: 11,668 km^{2} (4,505 sq mi)

Hydrology
- Rivers: Cesar, Ranchería, Guatapurí

Geology
- Basin type: Intermontane foreland basin
- Plate: North Andes
- Orogeny: Andean
- Age: Jurassic-Holocene
- Stratigraphy: Stratigraphy
- Field: Marracas

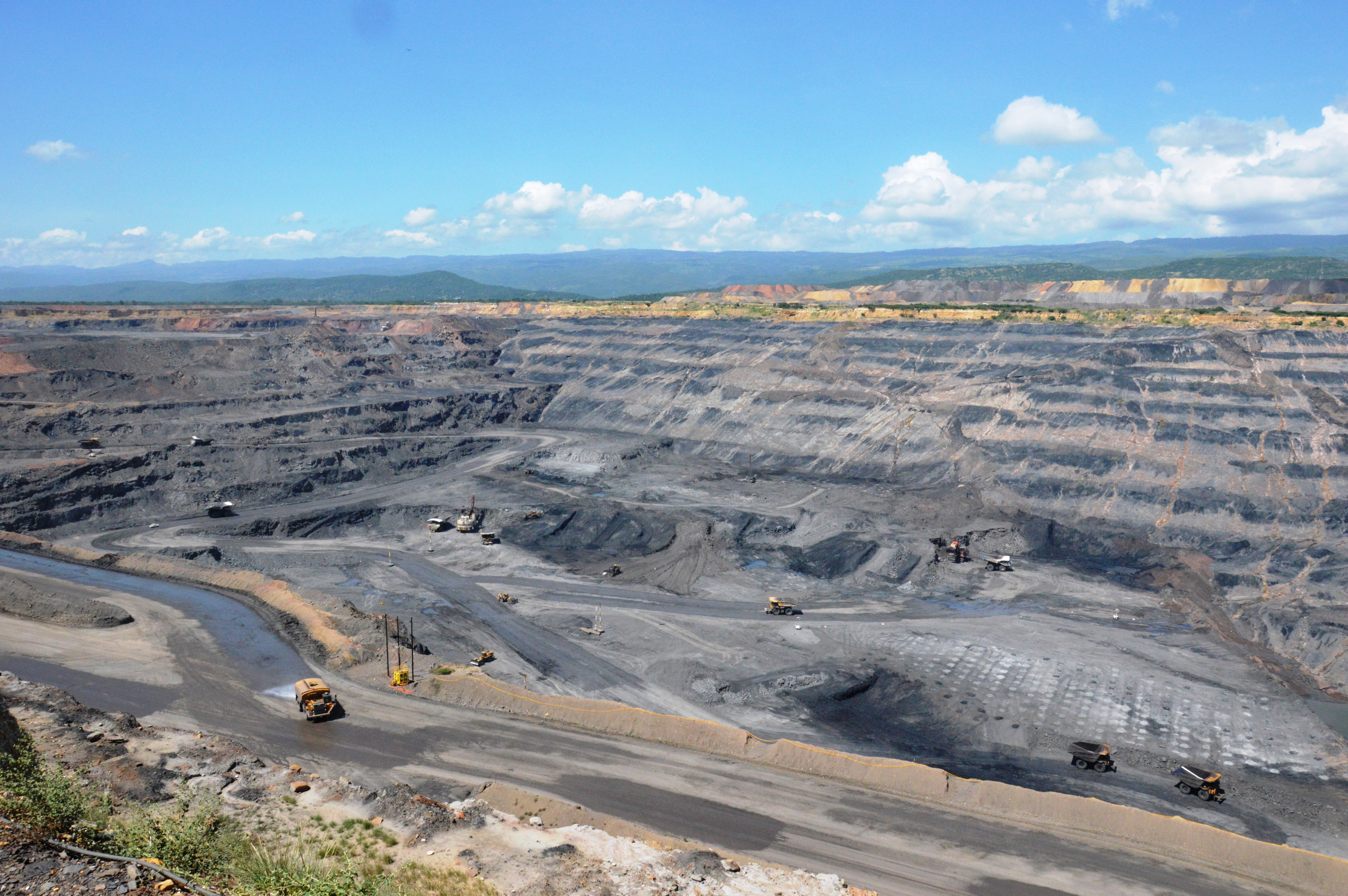
The tenth biggest coal mine in the world, Cerrejón, in the northeast of the basin

The Cesar-Ranchería Basin (Spanish: Cuenca Cesar-Ranchería) is a sedimentary basin in northeastern Colombia. It is located in the southern part of the department of La Guajira and northeastern portion of Cesar. The basin is bound by the Oca Fault in the northeast and the Bucaramanga-Santa Marta Fault in the west. The mountain ranges Sierra Nevada de Santa Marta and the Serranía del Perijá enclose the narrow triangular intermontane basin, that covers an area of 11,668 square kilometres (4,505 sq mi). The Cesar and Ranchería Rivers flow through the basin, bearing their names.

The basin is of importance for hosting the worldwide tenth biggest and largest coal mine of Latin America, Cerrejón. The coals are mined from the Paleocene Cerrejón Formation, that also has provided several important paleontological finds, among others Titanoboa cerrejonensis, with an estimated length of 14 metres (46 ft) and a weight of 1,135 kilograms (2,502 lb), the biggest snake discovered to date, the giant crocodylians Cerrejonisuchus improcerus, Anthracosuchus balrogus and Acherontisuchus guajiraensis, and the large turtles Carbonemys cofrinii, Puentemys mushaisaensis and Cerrejonemys wayuunaiki. Various genera of flora, as Aerofructus dillhoffi, Menispermites cerrejonensis, M. guajiraensis, Montrichardia aquatica, Petrocardium cerrejonense and P. wayuuorum, Stephania palaeosudamericana and Ulmoidicarpum tupperi among others, have been found in the Cerrejón Formation, the sediments of which are interpreted as representing the first Neotropic forest in the world. Mean annual temperature has been estimated to have been between 28.5 and 33 °C (83.3 and 91.4 °F) and yearly precipitation ranging from 2,260 to 4,640 millimetres (89 to 183 in) per year.

The Cesar-Ranchería Basin is relatively underexplored for hydrocarbons, compared to neighbouring hydrocarbon-rich provinces as the Maracaibo Basin and Middle Magdalena Valley. The first oil exploration was conducted in 1916 and several wells have been drilled since then. The basin is estimated to host the second-largest reserves of coal bed methane (CBM) of Colombia, with 25% of the country's total resources. The coal of the basin is mined in several quarries, most notably Cerrejón and La Francia. The total production of coal from the Cesar-Ranchería Basin in 2016 was almost 81 Megatons.

== Etymology ==
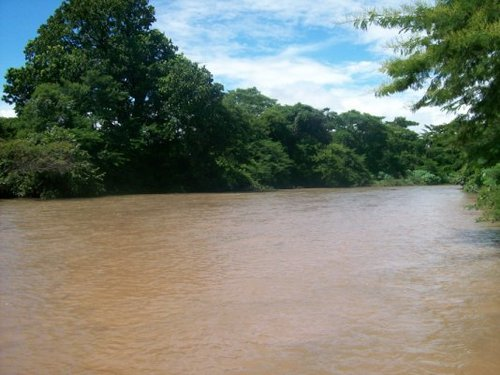
Cesar River

The name of the basin is taken from the Cesar and Ranchería Rivers.

== Description ==
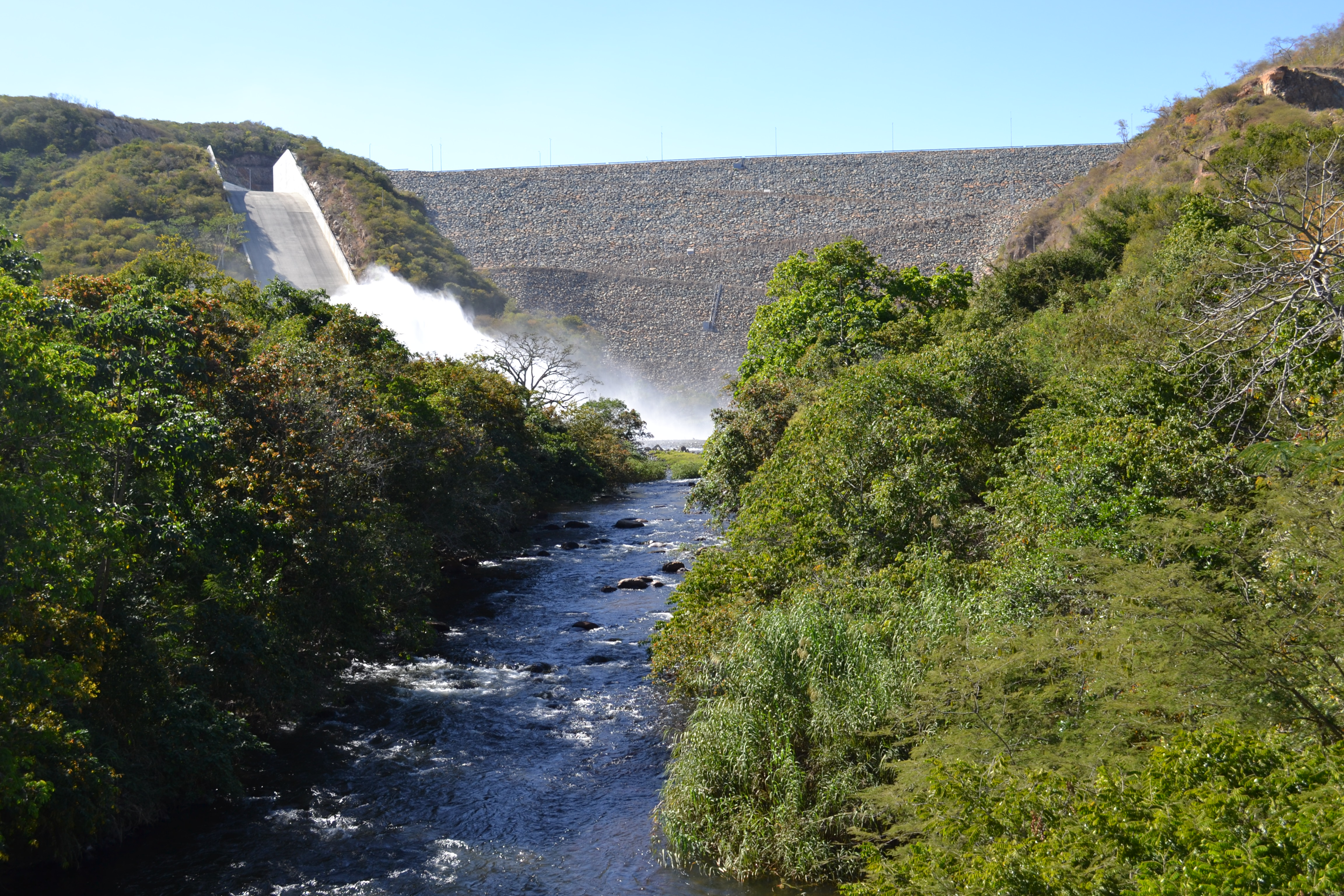
Ranchería River in Distracción

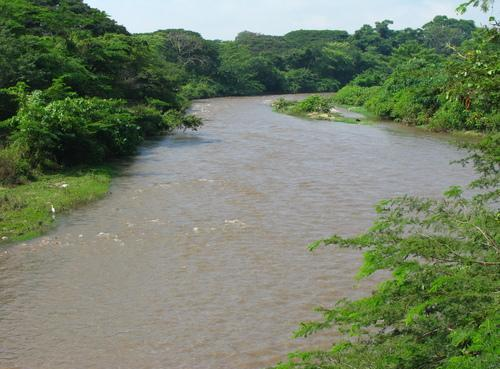
Ranchería River in Fonseca

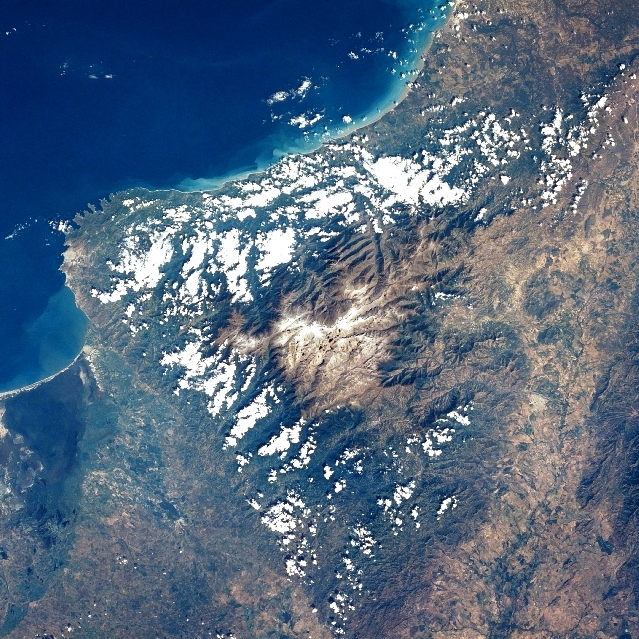
The Cesar-Ranchería Basin is located to the southeast of the Sierra Nevada de Santa Marta

The Cesar-Ranchería Basin is an intermontane foreland basin enclosed by two main mountain ranges; the northernmost Andean Serranía del Perijá in the southeast of the basin and the triangular Sierra Nevada de Santa Marta to the northwest. The northeastern limit is sharply formed by the dextral strike-slip Oca Fault, while the Bucaramanga-Santa Marta Fault forms the boundary to the west. The faults form the border with the Guajira Basin and Middle Magdalena Valley respectively. The basin has a general orientation of 30 degrees from north. The Cesar-Ranchería Basin is subdivided into the Cesar Basin in the west, named after and hydrographically dominated by the Cesar River in the Magdalena River watershed, and the Ranchería Basin in the east. The latter is named after the Ranchería River flowing towards the Caribbean Sea and separated from the Cesar River by the intrabasinal Valledupar High, an extension of the Verdesia High. The southeastern edge of the basin is formed by the border with Venezuela. In total, the basin covers an area of 11,668 square kilometres (4,505 sq mi).

The sedimentary sequence inside the basin comprises Jurassic to Quaternary rocks, underlain by Paleozoic basement. An important unit is the Paleocene Cerrejón Formation, hosting major coal reserves, excavated in several open-pit mines of which Cerrejón in the northeast of the basin is the most striking. Cerrejón is the tenth biggest coal mine worldwide and the largest of Latin America. The formation provides low-ash, low-sulphur bituminous coal with a total production in 2016 of almost 33 Megatons. Other coal mines include La Francia, in the western Cesar portion of the basin. The total coal production of the Cesar-Ranchería Basin in 2016 was nearly 81 Megatons.

The Cesar-Ranchería Basin is located at the northern edge of the South American Plate, close to the Caribbean Plate. During the Mesozoic and early Cenozoic eras, the basin was connected to the Magdalena River basins (Middle and Lower Magdalena Valleys) and the Sinú-Jacinto Basin in the west and the Maracaibo Basin, of which the Catatumbo Basin forms the Colombian part, in the east. Compressional tectonic movement commenced in the Late Paleogene, creating an intermontane foreland basin enclosed by the Serranía del Perijá and the Sierra Nevada de Santa Marta. The east-west oriented dextral strike-slip Oca Fault in the north is estimated to have been active since the Early Eocene with a total displacement of 180 kilometres (110 mi). The Bucaramanga-Santa Marta Fault was a Jurassic extensional rift fault, reactivated as oblique reverse fault in the Oligocene.

Petroleum exploration in the Cesar-Ranchería Basin commenced in 1916. The first exploitation of hydrocarbons was performed in 1921 and 1922 at Infantas in the Ranchería Basin and in 1938 the first well (El Paso-1) was drilled in the Cesar Basin. The basin is relatively underexplored. The first 2D seismic lines were shot in the late 1970s and 1980s. The deepest well, El Paso-3, drilled to a total depth of 3,538 metres (11,608 ft) into the Cretaceous Aguas Blancas Formation. Oil extracted from the La Luna and Lagunitas Formations in the Papayal-1 well provided API gravities between 27 and 42. Gas is produced from the Colón and La Luna Formations at the Maracas Field in the extreme southwest of the basin. A 2012 study of the yet-to-find potential of the Colombian sedimentary basins provided estimates of (P90-P10) 6 to 217 billion barrels (950×10^{6} to 34,500×10^{6} m^{3}) total generated oil in the Cesar-Ranchería Basin. The basin is considered to be the second-most prospective of Colombia in coal bed methane (CBM) with 25% of the country's total resources. Total probable gas reserves from this unconventional source have been estimated in 2014 at between 12.8 and 25.1 trillion cubic feet (360×10^{9} and 710×10^{9} m^{3}), up from an estimate ten years before of 6.9 trillion cubic feet (200×10^{9} m^{3}).

=== Municipalities ===
Municipality bold is capital	Department	Altitude of urban centre	Inhabitants 2015	Notes	Topography
Albania	La Guajira	320 m (1,050 ft)	26,606		
Barrancas	La Guajira	40 m (130 ft)	34,619		
Hatonuevo	La Guajira	50 m (160 ft)	24,916		
Distracción	La Guajira	65 m (213 ft)	15,790		
Fonseca	La Guajira	11.8 m (39 ft)	33,254		
El Molino	La Guajira	240 m (790 ft)	8718		
San Juan del Cesar	La Guajira	250 m (820 ft)	37,327		
Villanueva	La Guajira	250 m (820 ft)	27,657		
Urumita	La Guajira	255 m (837 ft)	17,910		
La Jagua del Pilar	La Guajira	223 m (732 ft)	3213		
Valledupar	Cesar	168 m (551 ft)	473,232	(Note: 2017 population data)	
Manaure Balcón del Cesar	Cesar	775 m (2,543 ft)	14,514		
La Paz	Cesar	165 m (541 ft)	22,815		
Pueblo Bello	Cesar	1,200 m (3,900 ft)	22,275		
San Diego	Cesar	180 m (590 ft)	22,815		
Agustín Codazzi	Cesar	131 m (430 ft)	50,829		
Bosconia	Cesar	200 m (660 ft)	37,248		
El Paso	Cesar	36 m (118 ft)	22,832		
Becerril	Cesar	200 m (660 ft)	13,453		
La Jagua de Ibirico	Cesar	150 m (490 ft)	22,283		
Chiriguaná	Cesar	40 m (130 ft)	19,650		
Curumaní	Cesar	112 m (367 ft)	24,367		
Chimichagua	Cesar	49 m (161 ft)	30,658		

=== Tectonic history ===
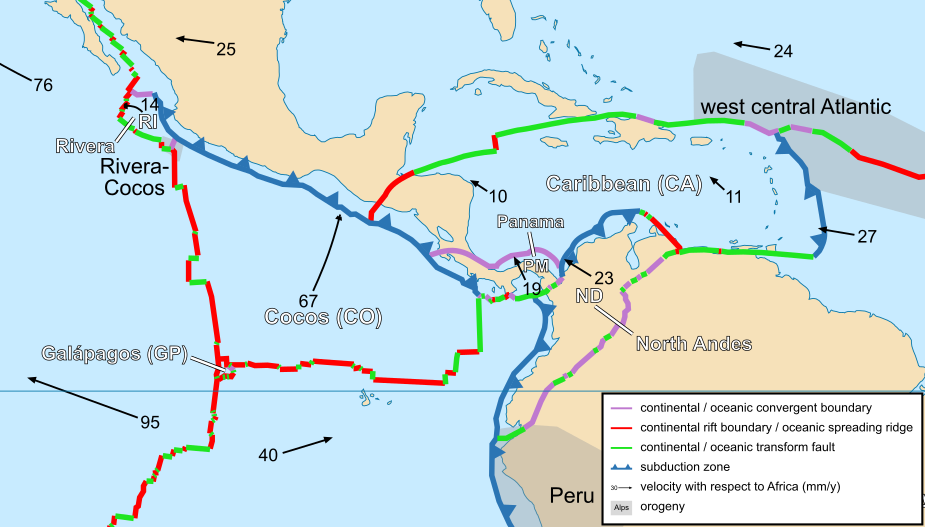
The tectonic history of the Cesar-Ranchería Basin at the North Andes Plate is influenced by the interaction of the Malpelo, South American and Caribbean Plates

The tectonic history of the Cesar-Ranchería Basin has been subdivided into six phases. The basin started as a passive margin in the Paleozoic, followed by a compressive margin in the Late Permian to Triassic, a phase of rifting in the Jurassic. Subsequently, the basin experienced a back-arc basin setting in the Cretaceous, a second compressive margin during the Late Cretaceous to Eocene and a final intramontane phase since the Eocene.

==== Passive margin ====
The passive margin phase was characterised by the deposition of shallow marine sediments in three periods, divided by unconformities. The unconformities have been dated to the Ordovician-Silurian, Early Carboniferous and Early Permian respectively. The events were accompanied by acidic plutons found all across northern South America.

==== Compressive margin I ====
The Andean orogeny, active since the Cretaceous, has formed several volcanic arcs to the west of the Cesar-Ranchería Basin

Sediments from the Late Permian to Triassic periods are absent in the Cesar-Ranchería Basin, but evidenced in the surrounding orogens. Intense magmatism and metamorphism affected the Sierra Nevada de Santa Marta and the Central Ranges of the Colombian Andes. The compressive phase is associated with the Hercynian orogeny, leading to the formation of Pangea.

==== Rift basin ====
The break-up of Pangea in the Early Jurassic generated a sequence of rift basins in northern South America, surrounding the proto-Caribbean. The area of the present-day Serranía del Perijá was a continental rift, while basins to the west were marine in origin. Regional fault lineaments formed during this phase, that during the compression of the Andean orogenic stage were reactivated as thrust faults. The current compressional faults of the Cesar-Ranchería Basin are high-angle.

The rift basin setting spanned the Jurassic period and was followed by post-rift sedimentation in the Early Cretaceous, evidenced by the Río Negro and Lagunitas Formations.

==== Back-arc basin ====
A back-arc basin is formed when a subducting plate creates accommodation space behind a volcanic arc

During the Cretaceous, the basins of northern South America were connected in a back-arc basin setting. The first phase of the Andean orogeny uplifted the Western Ranges and was characterised by magmatism in the Sierra de San Lucas in the northern Central Ranges, dated to the Albian to Cenomanian epochs. Sedimentation on the northern South American platform was of siliciclastic and carbonate character, the latter more dominant in the northern areas. In the Cesar-Ranchería Basin, this led to the deposition of the main source rock formations of the basin, most notably La Luna.

==== Compressive margin II ====
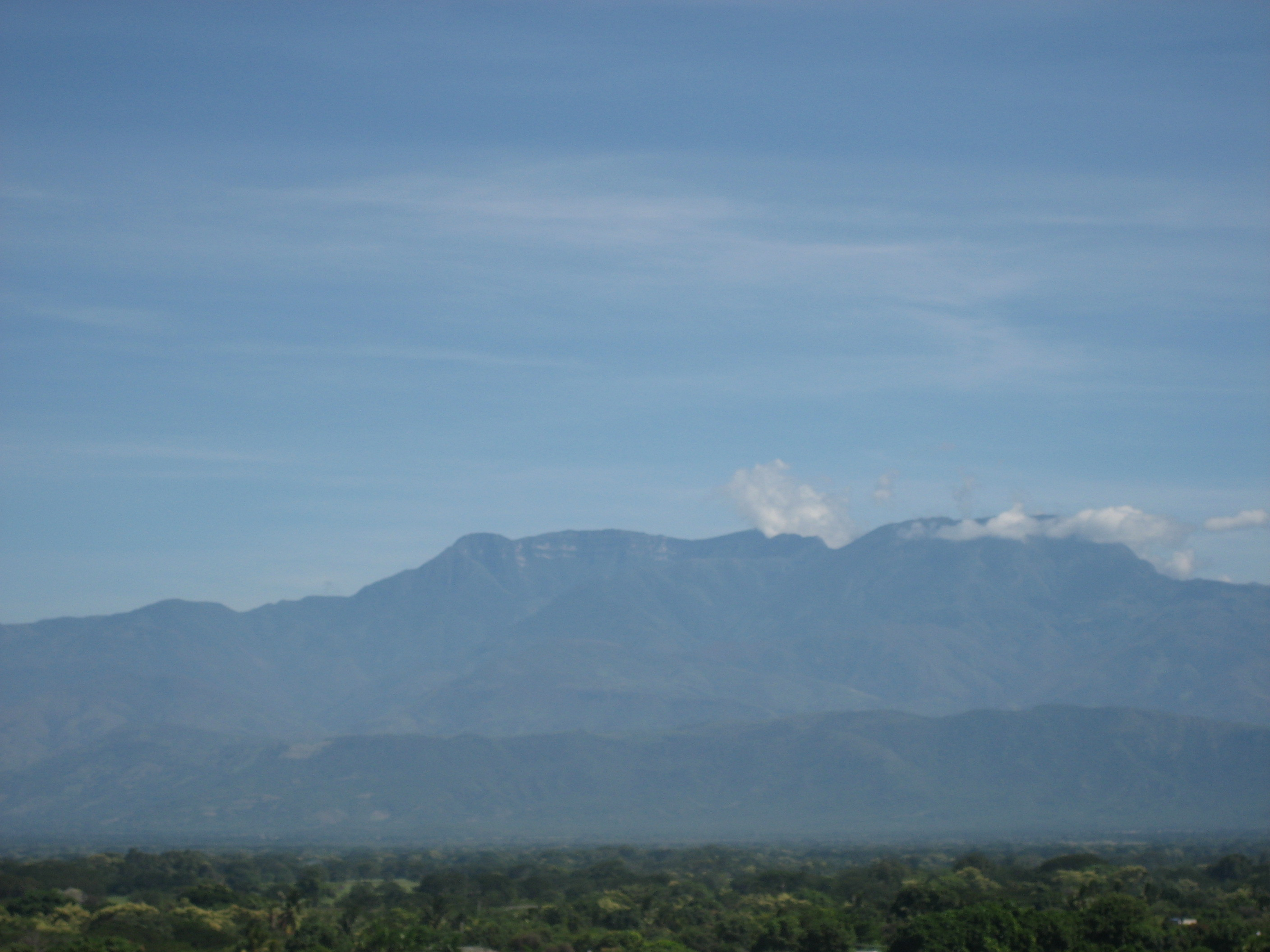
The uplift of the Serranía del Perijá made the Cesar-Ranchería Basin an intermontane basin

A second phase of compressive margin has been noted in the Cesar-Ranchería Basin by the strong differences between the sedimentary thicknesses of the Paleocene formations. During this stage in the basin development, the Cesar-Ranchería Basin was connected to the Middle Magdalena Valley to the west. The Paleocene Lisama Formation has a reduced thickness in the northern part of the Middle Magdalena Valley due to erosion, while the Paleocene section in the Cesar-Ranchería Basin is very thick. This has been explained by the tilt of the Sierra Nevada de Santa Marta and the formation of several thick-skinned thrust faults in the basin. The initiation of this compressive phase has been dated to the Maastrichtian, when tectonic uplift and deformation was active in the Central Ranges, to the west of the basin.

==== Intermontane foreland basin ====
While the Llanos Basin to the southeast experienced a foreland basin setting since the Paleogene, due to the first phases of uplift of the Eastern Ranges, the Cesar-Ranchería Basin was characterised by an intermontane basin setting with forming mountain ranges to the north and southeast; the Sierra Nevada de Santa Marta and Serranía del Perijá respectively. Inside the basin, the main compressional movement is dated to this phase, where reverse faults were formed.

=== Stratigraphy ===
The stratigraphy of the Cesar-Ranchería Basin has been described by various authors. The coal producing area was mapped in 1961.

Age	Cesar Sub-basin	Ranchería Sub-basin	Maximum thickness	Petroleum geology	Notes
Quaternary	Alluvial conglomerates		15 m (49 ft)	Overburden	
Late Miocene; Early Oligocene	Cuesta Formation	Palmito Shale	600 m (2,000 ft)	Seal rock (SL)	
Oligocene; Late Eocene	Hiatus	La Guajira calcareous complex	270 m (890 ft)	Reservoir rock (RES)	
Eocene; Late Paleocene	Hiatus	Tabaco Formation	75 m (246 ft)	RES	
Mid-Late Paleocene	La Jagua Fm., Los Cuervos Fm.	Cerrejón Formation	750 m (2,460 ft)	RES, SL	
Early-Mid Paleocene	Barco Formation	Manantial Formation	350 m (1,150 ft)	RES	
Early Paleocene; Maastrichtian	Delicias Formation	Hato Nuevo Formation	135 m (443 ft)	RES	
Maastrichtian; Campanian	Molino Formation		1,686 m (5,531 ft)	SL, Source rock (SR)	
Coniacian; Turonian	La Luna Formation		100 m (330 ft)	RES, SR	
Cenomanian; Aptian	Cogollo Gp. Aguas Blancas Formation		390 m (1,280 ft)	RES, SR, SL	
Albian; Aptian	Cogollo Gp. Lagunitas Formation		350 m (1,150 ft)	RES, SR	
Aptian; Barremian	Río Negro Formation		200 m (660 ft)	RES	
Late Jurassic	La Quinta Formation		3,000 m (9,800 ft)		
Late Jurassic	Golero Rhyolite; Los Tábanos Rhyodacite			Basement	
Early-Mid Jurassic	La Ge Group; Tinacoa Formation; Macoíta Formation		3,950 m (12,960 ft)	Basement	
Early-Mid Jurassic	S.N. de Santa Marta Sequence; Los Clavos Ignimbrite; La Caja de Ahorros Ignimbrite			Basement	
Mid to Late Triassic	Hiatus				
Early Triassic; Late Permian	Sevilla Metamorphic Complex			Basement	
Early Permian	Manaure Formation		800 m (2,600 ft)	Basement	
Carboniferous	Carboniferous sequence		500 m (1,600 ft)	Basement	
Devonian	Río Cachirí Group		1,100 m (3,600 ft)	Basement	
Silurian	Hiatus				
Ordovician; Neoproterozoic	Perijá Formation		530 m (1,740 ft)	Basement	
Precambrian	Sierra Nevada Metamorphic Belt			Basement	

=== Paleontology ===
In the Cesar-Ranchería Basin several important fossils have been found, most notably in the Cerrejón Formation, together with the Lagerstãtte of the Honda Group at La Venta and the Paja Formation around Villa de Leyva, the most important fossiliferous stratigraphic unit of Colombia. The fossil flora and gigantic reptiles of the Cerrejón Formation provided abundant data on the paleo-ecology and climate of this first Neotropic environment of the Middle Paleocene.

==== Fossil content ====
Formation	Group	Species	Image	Notes
Cerrejón Fm.	Snakes	Titanoboa cerrejonensis		
Cerrejón Fm.	Crocodylians	Acherontisuchus guajiraensis		
Cerrejón Fm.	Crocodylians	Anthracosuchus balrogus		
Cerrejón Fm.	Crocodylians	Cerrejonisuchus improcerus		
Cerrejón Fm.	Turtles	Carbonemys cofrinii		
Cerrejón Fm.	Turtles	Cerrejonemys wayuunaiki		
Cerrejón Fm.	Turtles	Puentemys mushaisaensis		
Cerrejón Fm.	Macroflora	Aerofructus dillhoffi, Menispermites cerrejonensis, M. guajiraensis, Montrichardia aquatica, Petrocardium cerrejonense, P. wayuuorum, Stephania palaeosudamericana, Ulmoidicarpum tupperi, Acrostichum sp., Amaryllidaceae sp., Anacardiaceae sp., Annonaceae sp., Apocynaceae sp., Araceae sp., Arecaceae sp., Dicotyledonae sp., Elaeocarpaceae sp., Euphorbiaceae sp., Fabaceae sp., Lauraceae sp., Malvaceae sp., Malvoideae sp., Meliaceae sp., Monocotyledoneae sp., Moraceae sp., Pinales sp., Pteridophyta sp., Salicaceae sp., Salvinia sp., Sapotaceae sp., Stenochlaena sp., Sterculioideae sp., Violaceae sp., Zingiberales sp.		
Cerrejón Fm.	Pollen	Proxapertites operculatus, Gemmatus phanocolpites gemmatus, Mauritidlites franciscoi, M. franciscoi var. pachyexinatus, Ctenolophonidites lisamae, Psilatriatriletes guaduensis, Foveotriletes cf. margaritae, Psilamonocolpites sp., Longapertites vaneenderburgi, Retidiporites magdalenensis		
Manantial Fm. Hato Nuevo Fm.	Foraminifera	Rzehakina epigona, Globorotalia conicotruncana, Globigerina eugubina		
Manantial Fm. Hato Nuevo Fm.	Pollen	Fovetriletes margaritae, Psilatriletes guaduensis, P. martinensis, Zonotricolpites cf. variabilis, Proxapertites opercutatus, P. maracaiboensis, P. humbertoides, Psilabrevitricolpites marginatus, Ctenolophonidites sp.		
Molino Fm.	Foraminifera	Globotruncana fornicata, G. caniculata ventricosa, Globigerina cretacea, Gumbelina globulosa, G. excolta, Siphogenerinoides cretacea, S. bramlettei, Abathomphalus mayorensis, Guembelitria cretacea, Globorotruncanita conica, Gansserina gansseri, Racemiguembelina fructicosa, Heferohelix striata, H. navarroensis, Pseudoguembelina excolata, P. palpebra, Globotruncana aegyptiaca		
Molino Fm.	Pollen	Echitriporites suescae, Echimonocolpites ruedae, Foveotriletes margaritae, Mauritildites protofranciscoi, Psilatriletes guaduensis, Araucariacites sp., Rugutriletes sp., Proxapertites operculatus, P. psilatus, Spiniferites cf. ramosus, Achomosphaera sp., Dinogymnium sp.		
La Luna Fm.	Molluscs, & foraminifera	Neoptychites sp., Holitoides sp., Fagesia sp., Prothocantoceras sp., Eucalycoceras sp., Cloleopoceras sp., Baroisiceras sp., Baculites sp., Tissotis sp., Perinoceras aff. moureti, Whiteinella archeocretacea		
Aguas Blancas Fm.	Molluscs & foraminifera	Ostrea scyfax, Exogyra toxaster, Choffatella decipiens, Cheloniceras sp., Pseudosaynella sp., Dufrenoyia sp., Turrulitas sp., Acanthoceras sp., ?Montelliceras sp., ?Calvoceras sp., Orbitolina conica texana, Heterohelix reussi, Marginotruncana sinuosa		
Río Cachirí Gp.	Molluscs	Acrospirifer olssoni; Spirifer kingi, Leptaena boyaca, Fenestella venezuelansis, Neospirifer latus, Composita subtilita, Phricodrotis planoconvexa, Pecten sp.		

== Basin evolution ==
=== Paleozoic to Early Mesozoic ===
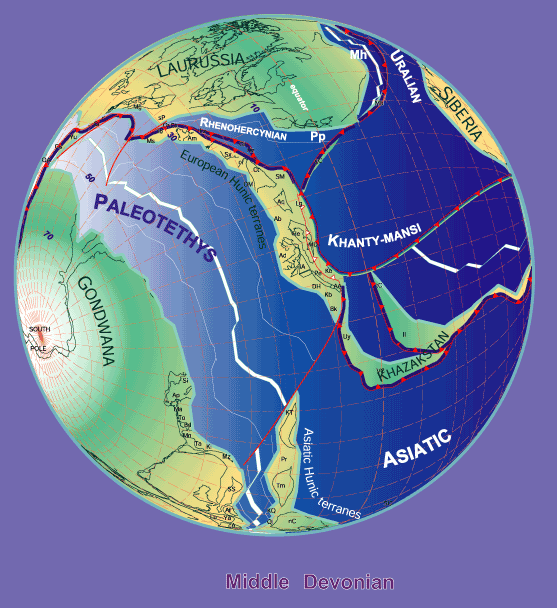
During deposition of the Río Cachirí Group around 380 Ma, the Cesar-Ranchería Basin was located at the edge of the Paleo-Tethys Ocean, by Stampfli & Borel

The Cesar-Ranchería Basin is underlain by Neoproterozoic basement. The Sierra Nevada Metamorphic Belt was formed during the Grenville orogeny, when the supercontinent Rodinia was formed due to the collision of Amazonia, Baltica and Laurentia. The granulites and gneisses of the complex metamorphosed 1.5 to 1.0 billion years ago. The phyllites and quartzites of the Perijá Formation were formed during the Early Paleozoic and are related to the Caledonian orogeny. The shales of the Río Cachirí Group were deposited in the Devonian and contain abundant fossils of brachiopods, bryozoa, corals and crinoids. The formation is time-equivalent with the fossiliferous Floresta and Cuche Formations of the Altiplano Cundiboyacense. The sediments were deposited in an epicontinental sea at the edge of the Paleo-Tethys Ocean, the last remnant of the Rheic Ocean.

During the Early Carboniferous (Pennsylvanian), the Cesar-Ranchería Basin experienced a regressional phase with the deposition of sandstones and limestones. The Early Permian is represented by the Manaure Formation, a sequence of sandstones and conglomerates. The formation of Pangea in the Late Permian to Early Triassic led to the formation of a metamorphic complex, named Sevilla. The gneisses, amphibolites, greenschists and marbles are dated to 280 to 250 Ma. The basin was intruded by granites during the Early to Middle Jurassic being accompanied by volcanics and volcanoclastic sediments such as the basalts, tuffs, sandstones and breccias found in the Sierra Nevada de Santa Marta. This magmatic phase correlated with the sedimentary sequence of the La Ge Group, subdivided into the Tinacoa and Macoíta Formations, a series of tuffaceous sandstones, limestones, shales and siltstones.

Paleogeography of Colombia
170 Ma
150 Ma
120 Ma
105 Ma
90 Ma
65 Ma
50 Ma
35 Ma
20 Ma
Present

=== Early to Late Mesozoic ===
The sedimentary sequence drilled in the basin starts with the La Quinta Formation, that is found in a widespread area across northern Colombia and Venezuela. The formation of sandstones, basalts, conglomerates and volcanic ash was deposited in a lacustrine depositional environment in a rift basin setting related to the break-up of Pangea and has been dated to the Late Jurassic and earliest Cretaceous, 160 to 140 Ma. The formation is time-equivalent with the Girón Formation of the Eastern Ranges. The Early Cretaceous Río Negro Formation, a unit composed of sandstones, conglomerates and siltstones, is very variable in thickness in the basin and associated with continental sedimentation on rift shoulders to a post-rift setting. The formation is time-equivalent with the Tibasosa Formation of the Eastern Ranges and the Tambor Formation of the Middle Magdalena Valley. The fossiliferous limestones and shales of the Lagunitas Formation, lower member of the Cogollo Group, contain beds of dolomite and are indicative of a shallow, saline environment. The formation is correlated with the Rosablanca Formation of the Middle Magdalena Valley and western Eastern Ranges and the Tibú Formation of the Maracaibo Basin. The unit is the deepest source rock for the oils in the Cesar-Ranchería Basin. The upper member of the Cogollo Group, the Aguas Blancas Formation, presents a large lateral variability in lithologies. Black biomicrites and fossiliferous limestones are indicative of a middle to outer platform environment, while sandy shales and glauconitic sandstones indicate a shallow marine environment. The variation in lithologies and organic content of this source rock formation is associated with basinal relative sea level changes and the organic-rich strata to the Aptian anoxic event, dated to approximately 120 million years ago.

The Lower Cretaceous series is followed by the deposition of the regional main source rock of northern Colombia and northwestern Venezuela, La Luna. The world class source rock contains high levels of Total Organic Carbon, comparable to the Kimmeridge Clay Formation of the basins of the North Sea. The ammonite-rich shales and biomicrites of La Luna were deposited during the global anoxic event of the Cenomanian-Turonian (around 90 Ma) characterised by a maximum flooding surface sequence. The highly organic formation is time-equivalent with the Querecual Formation of eastern Venezuela, the Chipaque and Gachetá Formations of the Colombian Eastern Ranges and Llanos Basin respectively and the Celendín Formation of northeastern Peru. The Late Cretaceous Molino Formation, laterally equivalent with the Colón and Mito Juan Formations of the Maracaibo and Catatumbo Basins, and the Umir Formation of the Middle Magdalena Valley, consists of calcareous shales intercalated by sandstones. The widespread correlation of this unit with the neighbouring formations indicates an open marine environment all across northwestern South America.

=== Paleogene to recent ===
At the end of the Cretaceous, the tectonic regime changed to a compressive phase, due to the movement of the Caribbean Plate. The Early Paleocene deposits of the Hato Nuevo and Manantial Formations show a more calcareous character in the north, while the Cesar Sub-basin contained more siliclastic sedimentation, represented in the Barco Formation, consisting of more lithic fragments than the equivalent of the Llanos Basin. Compression continued during the Paleocene, with uplifted areas to the northwest and southeast and volcanism in the proto-Caribbean. The global climate was very hot in this period and in the restricted basin between the two forming mountain ranges, a unique ecosystem developed; the first Neotropic forest. In this hot and humid environment, the largest species of reptiles since the extinction of the dinosaurs evolved, of which Titanoboa was the main predator. It has been estimated on the basis of the fossil flora, pollen and large reptiles that the mean annual temperature was between 28.5 and 33 °C (83.3 and 91.4 °F) and yearly precipitation ranging from 2,260 to 4,640 millimetres (89 to 183 in) per year. Provenance analysis of the sediments of the Los Cuervos and Cerrejón Formations show a predominant west to east paleocurrent, followed by a more southeastern flow. A secondary source of sediments was the growing Serranía del Perijá.

During the Eocene and Early Oligocene, the western part of the basin was exposed and modest deposition concentrated in the Ranchería Sub-basin. The previously humid ecosystem changed to an arid plain environment. In contrast, the Neogene conglomerates of the Cuesta Formation show a larger thickness in the southwestern part of the basin, close to the connected Middle Magdalena Valley. During this period, especially in the Late Miocene to Pliocene, the Oca and Bucaramanga-Santa Marta Faults were tectonically active, which is still observed in the present day. Ongoing uplift and reverse faulting created the intermontane fluvial-dominated basin architecture of today.

== Economic geology ==
The Cesar Ranchería Basin is part of a major petroleum province in northwestern South America

=== Petroleum geology ===
Despite various detailed studies and the similarities with neighbouring hydrocarbon rich provinces as the Maracaibo, Catatumbo and Middle Magdalena Basins, the Cesar-Ranchería Basin is relatively underexplored. Minor gas production is centered in the south of the Cesar Sub-basin, but most exploration wells were drilled before the 1950s. As of 2007, 14 wells were drilled in the basin. A major project to reprocess and interpret 2D seismic lines has been conducted in 2006. The basin is considered a major target for coal bed methane (CBM), due to the major coal deposits of the Los Cuervos and Cerrejón Formations. Total probable gas reserves for CBM are estimated at between 12.8 and 25.1 trillion cubic feet (360×10^{9} and 710×10^{9} m^{3}),

Vitrinite reflectance data from several source rocks of the Cesar-Ranchería Basin show present-day mature to overmature Cretaceous formations (La Luna, Aguas Blancas and Lagunitas Formations) and (marginally) mature Paleocene source rocks, mainly Los Cuervos. Apatite fission track analysis and modeling combined with vitrinite reflectance data, showed the Cretaceous units have a significant potential for hydrocarbon generation. The Lagunitas and Aguas Blancas Formations are heavily fractured and considered a good potential fractured reservoir, while the Río Negro Formation has been analysed to be cemented and bearing low porosities.

=== Mining ===
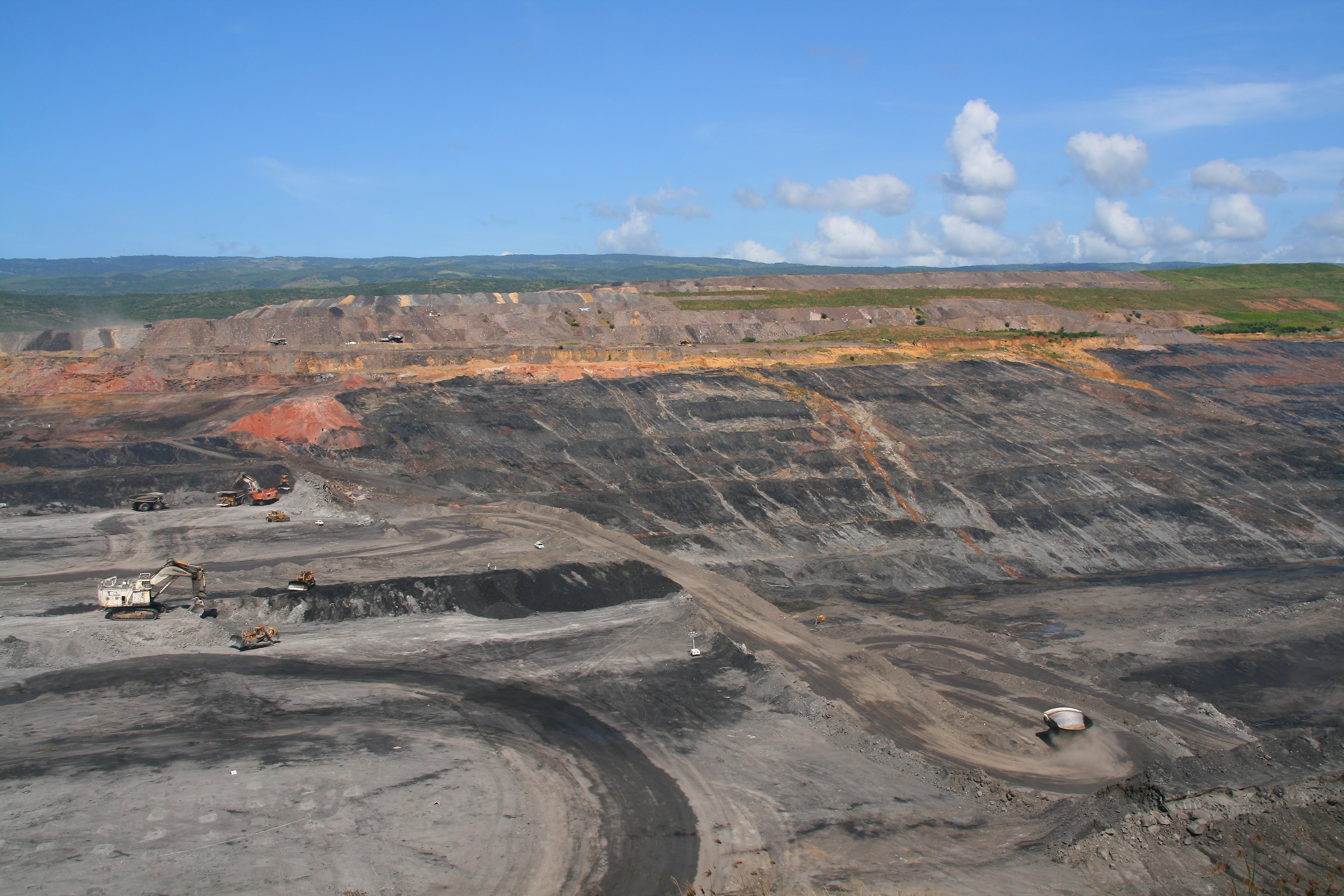
Mining in Cerrejón

Coal mining in the Cesar-Ranchería Basin is concentrated in the northeast, with Cerrejón spanning the municipalities Albania, Barrancas and Hatonuevo, and in the southwest, with La Francia in the municipalities Becerril and El Paso. At Cerrejón, the coal is excavated from the Cerrejón Formation and in La Francia from the time-equivalent Los Cuervos Formation. Coal is also mined in Agustín Codazzi, Chiriguaná and La Jagua de Ibirico. The total coal production of the Cesar-Ranchería Basin in 2016 was nearly 81 Megatons. Minor gold mining was active in Valledupar in 2008.

A study published in 2015 on the La Quinta Formation, shows the presence of 1.45% of copper, present mainly in malachite mineralisations in the volcanoclastic beds of the formation.

== See also ==
- Geology of Colombia
  - Geology of the Ocetá Páramo
  - Geology of the Eastern Hills
- Maracaibo Basin
- Middle Magdalena Valley
- Bogotá Formation, Honda Group

== Notes and references ==
=== Bibliography ===
==== General ====
- Barrero, Dario; Pardo, Andrés; Vargas, Carlos A.; Martínez, Juan F. (2007), Colombian Sedimentary Basins: Nomenclature, Boundaries and Petroleum Geology, a New Proposal, ANH, pp. 1–92
- García González, Mario; Mier Umaña, Ricardo; Cruz Guevara, Luis Enrique; Vásquez, Mauricio (2009), Informe Ejecutivo - evaluación del potencial hidrocarburífero de las cuencas colombianas, Universidad Industrial de Santander, pp. 1–219
- Garzón, José William (2014), Recursos de CBM en Colombia - estimación del potencial (PDF), ANH, pp. 1–31
- Naafs, B.D.A.; Castro, J.M.; De Gea, G.A.; Quijano, M.L.; Schmidt, D.N.; Pancost, R.D. (2016), "Gradual and sustained carbon dioxide release during Aptian Oceanic Anoxic Event 1a", Nature Geoscience, 9 (2): 135–139, doi:10.1038/ngeo2627, hdl:1983/a790084f-3a49-4503-bb94-3bc00a555bd6

==== Cesar-Ranchería Basin ====
===== Cesar-Ranchería general =====
- Arias, Alfonso; Morales, Carlos J. (1994), Evaluación del agua subterránea en el Departamento del Cesar, INGEOMINAS, pp. 1–107
- Ayala Calvo, Rosa Carolina (2009), Análisis tectonoestratigráfico y de procedencia en la Subcuenca de Cesar: Relación con los sistemas petroleros (MSc.) (PDF), Universidad Simón Bolívar, pp. 1–255
- Bayona, Germán; Lamus Ochoa, Felipe; Cardona, Agustín; Jaramillo, Carlos; Montes, Camilo; Tchegliakova, Nadejda (2007), "Procesos orogénicos del Paleoceno para la cuenca de Ranchería (Guajira, Colombia) y áreas adyacentes definidos por análisis de procedencia" (PDF), Geología Colombiana, 32: 21–46
- Cardeño Villegas, Karol; Rojas Martínez, Elias Ernesto; Manco Jaraba, Dino Carmelo; Cárdenas López, Rony Rafael (2015), "Identificación de las Mineralizaciones de Cobre Aflorantes en el Corregimiento de San José de Oriente, La Paz, Cesar", Ingeniare, 18 (18): 115–125, doi:10.18041/1909-2458/ingeniare.18.545
- Cardona, A.; Valencia, V.A.; Bayona, G.; Duque, J.; Ducea, M.; Gehrels, G.; Jaramillo, C.; Montes, C.; Ojeda & J. Ruiz, G. (2011), "Early-subduction-related orogeny in the northern Andes: Turonian to Eocene magmatic and provenance record in the Santa Marta Massif and Rancheria Basin, northern Colombia" (PDF), Terra Nova, 23: 26–34, doi:10.1111/j.1365-3121.2010.00979.x
- Cuéllar Cárdenas, Mario Andrés; López Isaza, Julián Andrés; Osorio Naranjo, Jairo Alonso; Carrillo Lombana, Edgar Joaquín (2012), "Análisis estructural del segmento Bucaramanga del Sistema de Fallas de Bucaramanga (sfb) entre los municipios de Pailitas y Curumaní, Cesar - Colombia" (PDF), Boletín de Geología, 34: 73–101
- García González, Mario; Mier Umaña, Ricardo; Arias R., Andrea F.; Cortes P., Yeny M.; Moreno C., Mario A.; Salazar C., Oscar M.; Jiménez J, Miguel F. (2007), Prospectividad de la cuenca Cesar-Ranchería, ANH, pp. 1–336
- Hernández Pardo, Orlando; Jaramillo, José María; Parra, Mauricio; Salazar, Armando; Donelick, Raymond; Blandón, Astrid (2009), Reconstrucción de la historia termal en el piedemonte occidental de la Serranía del Perijá entre Codazzi y La Jagua de Ibirico - Cuenca de Cesar-Ranchería (PDF), Universidad Nacional de Colombia & ANH, pp. 1–85
- Ojeda Marulanda, Carolina; Sánchez Quiñónez, Carlos Alberto (2013), "Petrografía, petrología y análisis de procedencia de unidades paleógenas en las cuencas Cesar - Ranchería y Catatumbo" (PDF), Boletín de Geología, 35: 67–80

===== Cerrejón Formation =====
- Cadena, Edwin A.; Ksepka, Daniel T.; Jaramillo, Carlos A.; Bloch, Jonathan I. (2012a), "New pelomedusoid turtles from the late Palaeocene Cerrejón Formation of Colombia and their implications for phylogeny and body size evolution" (PDF), Journal of Systematic Palaeontology, 10 (2): 313–331, Bibcode:2012JSPal..10..313C, doi:10.1080/14772019.2011.569031
- Cadena, Edwin A.; Bloch, Jonathan I.; Jaramillo, Carlos A. (2012b), "New bothremydid turtle (Testudines, Pleurodira) from the Paleocene of northeastern Colombia", Journal of Paleontology, 86 (4): 688–698, Bibcode:2012JPal...86..688C, doi:10.1666/11-128R1.1
- Cadena, Edwin A.; Bloch, Jonathan I.; Jaramillo, Carlos A. (2010), "New Podocnemidid Turtle (Testudines: Pleurodira) from the Middle-Upper Paleocene of South America", Journal of Vertebrate Paleontology, 30 (2): 367–382, Bibcode:2010JVPal..30..367C, doi:10.1080/02724631003621946
- Hastings, Alexander K.; Bloch, Jonathan I.; Jaramillo, Carlos A. (2014), "A new blunt-snouted dyrosaurid, Anthracosuchus balrogus gen. et sp. nov. (Crocodylomorpha, Mesoeucrocodylia), from the Palaeocene of Colombia" (PDF), Historical Biology, 27 (8): 998–1020, Bibcode:2015HBio...27..998H, doi:10.1080/08912963.2014.918968
- Hastings, Alexander K.; Bloch, Jonathan I.; Jaramillo, Carlos A. (2011), "A new longirostrine Dyrosaurid (Crocodylomorpha, Mesoeucrocodylia) from the Paleocene of north-eastern Colombia: Biogeographocal and behavioural implications for New-World Dyrosayridae" (PDF), Palaeontology, 54: 1095–1116, doi:10.1111/j.1475-4983.2011.01092.x
- Head, J.J.; Bloch, J.I.; Hastings, A.K.; Bourque, J.R.; Cadena, E.A.; Herrera, F.A.; Polly, P.D.; Jaramillo, C.A. (2009), "Giant boid snake from the paleocene neotropics reveals hotter past equatorial temperatures", Nature, 457 (7230): 715–718, Bibcode:2009Natur.457..715H, doi:10.1038/nature07671, PMID 19194448
- Herrera, Fabiany A.; Jaramillo, Carlos A.; Dilcher, David L.; Wing, Scott L.; Gómez N, Carolina (2008), "Fossil Araceae from a Paleocene neotropical rainforest in Colombia", American Journal of Botany, 95 (12): 1569–1583, doi:10.3732/ajb.0800172, PMID 21628164
- Wing, Scott L.; Herrera, Fabiany; Jaramillo, Carlos A.; Gómez Navarro, Carolina; Wilf, Peter; Labandeira, Conrad C. (2009), "Late Paleocene fossils from the Cerrejón Formation, Columbia ((sic)), are the earliest record of Neotropical rainforest", Proceedings of the National Academy of Sciences, 106 (44): 18627–18632, Bibcode:2009PNAS..10618627W, doi:10.1073/pnas.0905130106, PMC 2762419, PMID 19833876

===== Petroleum geology =====
- Garzón, José William (2014), Recursos de CBM en Colombia - estimación del potencial (PDF), ANH, pp. 1–31
- Geoestudios; ANH (2006), Cartografía geológica cuenca Cesar-Ranchería, ANH, pp. 1–95
- Mojica, Jairo; Arévalo, Oscar J.; Castillo, Hardany (2009), Cuencas Catatumbo, Cesar – Ranchería, Cordillera Oriental, Llanos Orientales, Valle Medio y Superior del Magdalena (PDF), ANH, pp. 1–65
- Olshansky, A.S.; Kuzmin, E.L.; Maslianitzkiy, V.V. (2007), Programa sísmico Cesar-Ranchería 2D - reporte final de procesamiento e interpretación (PDF), ANH, pp. 1–84
- Vargas Jiménez, Carlos A (2012), "Evaluating total Yet-to-Find hydrocarbon volume in Colombia", Earth Sciences Research Journal, 16: 1–290
- N., N (2010), Cuenca Cesar-Ranchería - Open Round Colombia 2010 (PDF), ANH, p. 1

==== Maps ====
- Colmenares, Fabio; Mesa, Milena; Roncancio, Jairo; Arciniegas, Edgar; Pedraza, Pablo; Cardona, Agustín; Silva, César; Romero, Jhoamna; Alvarado and Oscar Romero, Felipe Vargas, Carlos Santamaría, Sonia (2007), Plancha 34 - Agustín Codazzi - 1:100,000, INGEOMINAS, p. 1
- N., N (1961), Plancha 41 - Mapa geológico de la cuenca carbonífera Cesar-Ranchería - 1:100,000, INGEOMINAS, p. 1
- Hernández, Marina; Clavijo, Jairo; González, Javier (2001), Plancha 47 - Chiriguaná - 1:100,000, INGEOMINAS, p. 1
- Hernández, Marina; Clavijo, Jairo (2008), Plancha 48 - La Jagua de Ibirico - 1:100,000, INGEOMINAS, p. 1
