= La Francia =

Coal mine in Becerril & El Paso, Cesar-Ranchería Basin, Cesar, Colombia

- Location within Colombia
- Location: Becerril & El Paso Cesar-Ranchería Basin, Cesar, Colombia; 09°40′16.6″N 73°46′26.5″W
- Products: Coal
- Production: 4.1 Megatons
- Financial year: 2019
- Type: Coal mine
- Opened: 2000
- Active: 2000-2010 (Coalcorp); 2010-2013 (Goldman Sachs); 2013-2014 (Operations suspended); 2015-2020 (Murray Energy); 2020+ (Operations suspended)
- Company: American Consolidated Natural Resources (previously known as Murray Energy)
- Acquired: 2015

La Francia is a coal mine in the Cesar-Ranchería Basin, located in the municipalities Becerril and El Paso, Cesar, Colombia owned by the Goldman Sachs Group. It mines coal from the Paleocene Los Cuervos Formation, time-equivalent with the Cerrejón Formation, which is mined in the northeastern part of the basin in Latin America's largest coal mine, Cerrejón. In 2016, La Francia produced 11.6 Megatons of coal.

== History ==
The mine was owned by Coalcorp Mining until 2010. It was acquired by Goldman Sachs for US$200 million in 2010.

It closed in January 2013 after the contractor hired by Colombian National Resources opted out, but opened again in January 2014, at a lesser capacity.

During the strikes of 2013, miners occupied the mine and refused offers provided by the companies involved.

In 2015, Murray Energy (now known as American Consolidated Natural Resources) purchased the mine from Goldman Sachs.

As of August 2020, the mine has suspended operations indefinitely.
