= Manaure =

Manaure was the name of an indigenous chief or Cacique in Coro (Venezuela) (Venezuela) it may also refer to:

- Manaure, Cesar a town and municipality in Colombia
- Manaure, La Guajira a town and municipality in Colombia
- Manaure River a river in Colombia flowing through Manaure, Cesar
