= Astrea, Cesar =

Coordinates: 9°30′N 73°59′W

Astrea
- Town
- Flag Coat of arms

- Location of the municipality and town of Astrea in the Department of Cesar.
- Country: Colombia
- Region: Caribbean
- Department: Cesar
- Foundation: 1936

Government
  - Mayor: Edgar Orlando Barrios (Radical Change)
- Elevation: 200 m (660 ft)

Population (Census 2018)
  - Total: 18,434
- Time zone: UTC-5
- Website: astrea-cesar.gov.co

Astrea is a municipality and town of the Department of Cesar in northern Colombia.

== Geography ==
The municipality of Astrea limits to the north with the municipality of El Paso and northwest with Magdalena Department; to the south with the municipality of Chiriguana. It has an extension of 580 km^{2} (220 sq mi). The average temperature throughout the year is 30 °C.

The region is part of the geological Zambrano formation, formed in the Neogene presenting a gray-greenish clay.

== History ==
Founded by a farmer named Martín Mier Batista in 1936 when a group of farmers from the Magdalena Department arrived seeking better pastures.

After the creation of the Department of Cesar in 1964, Astrea became a corregimiento of the municipality of Chimichagua. On November 26, 1984, Astrea segregated from Chimichagua and became a municipality of the Department of Cesar by Ordinance 013 of 1984.

== Politics ==
=== Administrative divisions ===
Corregimientos

- Arjona
- San Pedro
- Santa Cecilia
- El Vallito

== Economy ==
Ranching and agriculture are the main economic activity in the region having the town of Astrea as the main urban center of the municipality. Agricultural products are commercialized in the town such as; yuca, sesame, corn and common bean among others.

== Culture ==
Astrea celebrates the Día de San Antonio de Pádua (Saint Anthony of Pádua) Day in the corregimiento of Arjona, every year on June 16. Astrea also celebrates a traditional feast honoring the Día de San Martín (St. Martin's Day) every November 11.
