= Einer Viveros =

Colombian footballer (born 1970)

Personal information
- Full name: Einer Viveros Torres
- Date of birth: December 31, 1970 (age 55)
- Place of birth: Robles, Colombia
- Height: 1.75 m (5 ft 9 in)
- Position: Defender

Senior career*
Years	Team	Apps	(Gls)
1994–1999	Unión Magdalena		
2000–2002	Deportes Tolima		
2003–2004	Unión Magdalena		
2004	Independiente Santa Fe		
2005	Deportivo Pasto	9	(0)
2006	Atlético Huila	13	(1)
2007	Deportivo Pasto	7	(0)
2007	Deportes Quindío	7	(0)
- * Club domestic league appearances and goals

Einer Viveros Torres (born 31 December 1970) is a former Colombian football player.

== Club career ==
Viveros began and spent most of his career with Unión Magdalena. He also played for Deportes Tolima and Deportivo Pasto, where he participated in the Copa Libertadores.

== See also ==
- Football in Colombia
- List of football clubs in Colombia
