= List of mayors of Bosconia =

The following is a list of mayors (Spanish: alcaldes) of the city of Bosconia, Colombia.

Term	Mayor	Notes
1995–1997	Jose Rafael Carrillo Acuna	
1998–2000*	Jorge Enrique Ramirez Acuna	
January 1, 2008 – present	Luis Abdon Perez	Member of the Colombian Conservative Party

== See also ==
- List of governors of Cesar Department
