= Petrocardium =

Petrocardium Temporal range: Middle to Late Paleocene ~60–58 Ma

Scientific classification
- Kingdom: Plantae
- Clade: Tracheophytes
- Clade: Angiosperms
- Clade: Monocots
- Order: Alismatales
- Family: Araceae
- Genus: †Petrocardium; Herrera et al. (2008)

Type species
- P. wayuuorum

Species
- P. cerrejonense; P. wayuuorum

Extinct genus of flowering plants

Petrocardium is an extinct genus of monocot plants in the family Araceae. At present it contains only two species Petrocardium cerrejonense and Petrocardium wayuuorum, the type species. The genus is solely known from the Middle to Late Paleocene (about 60 to 58 Ma), Cerrejón Formation deposits in Colombia.

== History and classification ==
The genus is known only from the two holotype specimens, number ING-0902, type specimen for Petrocardium wayuuorum, and ING-0804, type specimen for Petrocardium cerrejonense. The leaves are currently residing in the collections housed by the Colombian Geological Institute in Bogotá, Colombia. Both ING-0902 and ING-0804 were collected from Cerrejón Formation exposures in the Cerrejón coal mine, located in the Ranchería Basin, Colombia. They were first studied by a group of researchers from Florida Museum of Natural History, the Smithsonian Museum of Natural History and led by Fabiany Herrera from the Smithsonian Tropical Research Institute. Herrera and associates published their 2008 type description in the American Journal of Botany.

The generic epithet Petrocardium is Greek in derivation and is said to be a combination of the words petro meaning "rock" and cardium which means "heart" and references the heart shaped nature of the leaf fossils in the rocks. The proper words for rock and heart in Greek are however πέτρα (petra) and καρδία (kardia). The specific epithet "wayuuorum" was chosen by the authors to honor the Wayuu Amerindian tribe which lives in the Rancheria Basin area of Colombia. The specific epithet "cerrejonense" is a derivation of Cerrejón and reflects the type locality, the Cerrejón Formation.

== Description ==
Although several angiosperm families, such as Alismataceae, and Potamogetonaceae have leaf morphologies similar to Petrocardium, its lack of the primary vein structure found in those families excludes them as relatives. Petrocardium is placed as incertae sedis within the Araceae due to the unique combination of leaf morphology characteristics present in both species. Of the modern Araceae genera, Petrocardium is most similar to the modern tropical genus Anthurium in tribe Pothoeae. However it is not close in structure to the other three genera in the tribe, Pedicellarum, Pothoidium, and Pothos. This disparity lead the research team to leave the genus unplaced as to subfamily and tribe. Overall the genus possesses entire margined leaves with a generally ovate shape. The leaf apex is long and tapers to a point, while the base is heart to arrowhead shaped. The overall depositional environment, at an estimated paleolatitude of 5 degrees North, was that of sedimentation associated with a fluvial channel area formed within a Neotropical rainforest basin.

=== Petrocardium wayuuorum ===
The single known specimen of P. wayuuorum, ING-0902, was recovered from locality 0315, a 6 metres (20 ft) by 50 centimetres (20 in) lens of fine grained sandstone in the Cerrejón Formation. The specimen is missing the basal portion of the leaf but shows a smooth margin in the preserved regions of the leaf blade and was either cordate or sagittate. The overall size of the leaf was 6.2 by 3.8 centimetres (2.4 by 1.5 in), and has a vein structure similar to that of Anthurium species that form secondary veins which group in single cluster of veins parallel to the outer margin of the leaf. This secondary vein structure is used to distinguish P. wayuuorum from P. cerrejonense.

=== Petrocardium cerrejonense ===
As with P. wayuuorum, P. cerrejonense is known from only one partial leaf and specimen ING-0804, is also from locality 0315. The specimen is incomplete with only portions of the tip and middle area of the leaf blade known. The overall size of the leaf was over 9.5 by 24.3 centimetres (3.7 by 9.6 in), with an acuminate tip and smooth margin. P. cerrejonense has a vein structure similar to that of Anthurium species which form secondary veins which group into two clusters of veins parallel to the outer margin of the leaf and the secondary vein structure is used to distinguish P. cerrejonense from P. wayuuorum.
