= La Jagua de Ibirico, Cesar =

Coordinates: 9°34′N 73°20′W

La Jagua de Ibirico
- Municipality and town
- Flag Coat of arms

- Location of the municipality and town of La Jagua de Ibirico in the Department of Cesar.
- Country: Colombia
- Region: Caribbean
- Department: Cesar
- Foundation: 1771

Government
  - Mayor: Didier Lobo Chinchilla

Area
  - Municipality and town: 755.9 km^{2} (291.9 sq mi)
  - Urban: 4.76 km^{2} (1.84 sq mi)

Population (2018 census)
  - Municipality and town: 46,722
  - Density: 61.81/km^{2} (160.1/sq mi)
  - Urban: 35,513
  - Urban density: 7,460/km^{2} (19,300/sq mi)
- Time zone: UTC-5
- Website: lajaguadeibirico-cesar.gov.co http://www.lajaguadeibirico.com.co/

La Jagua de Ibirico ((Spanish pronunciation: [la ˈxaɣwa ðejβiˈɾiko]), literally "The Jagua of Ibirico") is a town and municipality in the Department of Cesar, Colombia. This region of La Jagua is rich in coal which is exploited extensively and is second only to El Cerrejon in La Guajira. The area is also known for being a hot spot in the Colombian conflict.

== Geography ==
The municipality of La Jagua de Ibirico borders to the north with the municipality of Becerril; to the east with Venezuela; to the south with the municipality of Chiriguana and to the west with the municipality of El Paso.

== History ==
The first inhabitants in the region were the Chiriguanás. During the Spanish conquest of the Americas period, some remnants of indigenous tribes pertaining to the Arhuacos and Yucos established in the area.

The village of La Jagua was founded in 1771 by the Spanish Juan Ramon de Ibirico.

La Jagua de Ibirico became a municipality by ordinance 005 of 1979.

In 1985 the rudimentary exploitation of coal began but with little results due to inexperience. In 1990 the government sponsored Carbocol gave concessions to mining companies.

The open-pit mine has expanded since 1985 to become one of Colombia's premier coal mining operations.
