= List of mayors of Becerril =

The following is a list of mayors of the city of Becerril, Colombia. (Spanish: Alcaldes de Becerril)

Term	Mayor	Notes
1995 - 1997	Carlos Alfonso Ariza Fachola	
1998 - 2000*	Lisimaco Machado Arce	*Machado Arce was assassinated by an armed group in El Paso, Cesar.
January 1, 2008 – Present	Nancy Bueno	Member of the Convergencia Ciudadana political party

== See also ==
- List of governors of Cesar Department
