= El Paso, Cesar =

Coordinates: 9.66222°N 73.7519°W

- Municipality
- Flag

- Location of the municipality and town of El Paso in the Department of Cesar.
- Country: Colombia
- Region: Caribbean
- Department: Cesar
- Foundation: 1602

Government
  - Mayor: Gunder Escobar (Alas Equipo Colombia)

Population (Census 2018)
  - Total: 34,620
- Time zone: UTC-5
- Website: elpaso-cesar.gov.co

El Paso is a municipality in the Cesar Department of Colombia. El Paso is mostly known for having the second largest coal mine in Colombia, located in the corregimiento of La Loma.

== Etymology ==
El Paso means "The Path" in the Spanish language. The name was mentioned in a document establishing the encomienda with the Chimila indigenous peoples in the region. The documents mentioned "The path of the advanced" in reference to the path of Alonso Luis de Lugo in 1544 from Cabo de la Vela in the Guajira Peninsula, Tamalameque in his way inland to the New Kingdom.

== Geography ==
The municipality of El Paso is located on the central western region of the Department of Cesar bordering to the north with the municipalities of Valledupar and Bosconia; to the east with the municipalities of Los Robles La Paz, Codazzi, Becerril and La Jagua de Ibirico; to the south with the municipality of Chiriguana; southwest with the municipality of Astrea and to the west with the Department of Magdalena.

== History ==
The region of El Paso was inhabited by the Chimilas. During the Spanish colonization of the Americas the region was a herd under the jurisdiction of the village of Becerril named the Hato of San Bartolome, established by Captain Bartolomé de Aníbal Paleólogo Becerra. Becerra's father, Vicencio de Anibal was also a conqueror and had received the capitulation for the land and Becerra had inherited his rights over the land as established in the document.

On August 16, 1602 the Spanish established an Encomienda with the Chimilas in the area. El Paso was under the jurisdiction of Valledupar which was the main village in the region until Law 25 of June 1824 created the Canton of Valencia de Jesus which had segregated from the jurisdiction of Valledupar. On October 25, 1825 the Canton of Valencia de Jesus was suppressed and once again reestablished to Valledupar.
