= List of mayors of Astrea, Colombia =

The following is a list of mayors of the city of Astrea, Colombia. (Spanish: Alcaldes de Astrea)

Term	Mayor	Notes
1995 - 1997	Otoniel Larios Lopez	
1998 - 2000	Jalilie Angulo	
January 1, 2008 – Present	Edgar Orlando Barrios	Member of the Radical Change political party

== See also ==
- List of governors of Cesar Department
