= Bosconia =

Coordinates: 9.97611°N 73.8903°W

- Municipality and town
- Flag Coat of arms

- Location of the municipality and town of Bosconia in the Department of Cesar.
- Country: Colombia
- Region: Caribbean
- Department: Cesar
- Foundation: 1958

Government
  - Mayor: Edulfo Villar Estrada

Area
  - Municipality and town: 586.2 km^{2} (226.3 sq mi)
  - Urban: 9.65 km^{2} (3.73 sq mi)

Population (2020 est.)
  - Municipality and town: 43,326
  - Urban: 40,562
  - Urban density: 4,200/km^{2} (10,900/sq mi)
- Time zone: UTC-5
- Website: www.bosconia.gov.co/

Bosconia is a town and municipality in the Colombian Department of Cesar.

== Geography ==
The municipality of Bosconia is located in the northwestern part of the Cesar Department. Borders to the north with the municipality of El Copey, to the east with the municipality of Valledupar, to the south with the municipality of El Paso and to the west with the Magdalena Department separated only by the Ariguaní River which is also a natural border and covering a total area of 609 km^{2}. The town of Bosconia is located in the central part of the municipality.

=== Climate ===
Average year temperature ranges 31 °C and has two rainy seasons intercalated with two dry seasons.

== History ==
The town of Bosconia was founded on August 20, 1958, by Enrique Aarón Haayén and Agustin Mackenzie in honor of Catholic church priest Saint John Bosco. The village became a train station stop for the farmers in the area. In 1979 Bosconia formally becomes a municipality of the Cesar Department. with the construction of paved highways the town of Bosconia became an intersection of two major transited Colombian highways that connect the northern Colombian departments of La Guajira and Cesar with the rest of Colombia and the other one that connects the northeast and the rest of Colombia with the road to the Caribbean Sea to Santa Marta and Barranquilla. These two highways intersect in downtown Bosconia and is nowadays known as "Bosconia's T".

== Politics ==
=== Administrative divisions ===
The municipality of Bosconia contains the urban area of the town of Bosconia and other small urban centers

==== Corregimientos ====
1. Loma Colorada

==== Veredas ====
1. El Edén
2. La Fortuna
3. Loma Linda
4. Puerto Lajas
5. Altos de Minas
6. Boca de Tigre
7. Tropezón
8. Nueva Idea
9. El Prado
