= Puentemys =

Puentemys Temporal range: Mid Paleocene (Itaboraian-Peligran) ~60–58 Ma

Scientific classification
- Domain: Eukaryota
- Kingdom: Animalia
- Phylum: Chordata
- Class: Reptilia
- Order: Testudines
- Suborder: Pleurodira
- Family: †Bothremydidae
- Subtribe: †Foxemydina
- Genus: †Puentemys; Cadena et al., 2012

Type species
- †Puentemys mushaisaensis Cadena et al., 2012

Extinct genus of turtles

Puentemys is an extinct genus of bothremydid turtle from the Paleocene-age Cerrejón Formation in Colombia. It is the largest known bothremydid, with a shell length of up to 1.51 m (5.0 ft). Puentemys is the only Paleocene bothremydid known from South America, and is most closely related to the genus Foxemys from the Late Cretaceous of Europe, showing that Bothremydini, the tribe of bothremydids to which Puentemys belonged, had a nearly worldwide distribution across the K-T boundary. The ancestors of Puentemys may have reached South America by dispersing across Paleocene coastlines or by riding currents across the Atlantic Ocean.
