= Los Robles La Paz =

Coordinates: 10°23′N 73°10′W

- Flag

- Location of the municipality and town of La Paz in the Department of Cesar.
- Country: Colombia
- Region: Caribbean
- Department: Cesar
- Foundation: 1700

Government
  - Mayor: Gerardo Alfonso Gutiérrez (Alas Equipo Colombia)

Population (Census 2018)
  - Total: 26,109
- Time zone: UTC-5
- Website: www.lapazrobles-cesar.gov.co

Los Robles La Paz (Spanish pronunciation: [los ˈroβles la pas]) or simply La Paz is a municipality and a town in the Department of Cesar, Colombia. The town is close to the Capital city of the Department of Cesar; Valledupar. The municipality of La Paz borders to the north with La Guajira Department, to the northeast with the municipality of Manaure. To the east with the Bolivarian Republic of Venezuela sharing the Serranía del Perijá mountain range. To the south with the municipality of Codazzi, southwest with the municipality of El Paso, Cesar (sharing the Magdalena River as border). To the west with the municipality of San Diego and to the northwest with the municipality of Valledupar.

The eastern part of the territory, near the Serranía del Perijá is inhabited by the Yukpa indigenous people.

== History ==
The first inhabitants of what is present-day the municipality of Los Robles La Paz were the indigenous peoples known as Chimila, which populated the plains of the valley of the Cesar River. On the Serranía del Perijá mountains the Yukpas were also part of the Chimila confederation of tribes.

The Spanish arrived in the area in 1531 but the region of Los Robles La Paz remained dominated by the Chimila. In 1700 Spanish Captain Salvador Felix de Arias was sent to "pacify" the indigenous tribes. Arias founded Los Robles La Paz this same year.

== FARC encampment ==
An encampment for decommissioned FARC fighters was established in 2016 near La Paz as a part of the Colombian peace process.

== Notable people ==
- Jorge Oñate (born 1949), musician
- Einer Viveros (born 1970), former footballer
