= Cerrejón Formation =

Geologic formation in Colombia

- Stratigraphic range: Mid-Late Paleocene; ~60–58 Ma
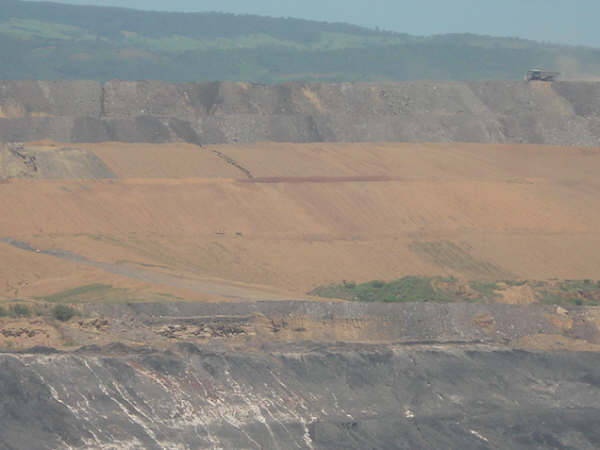
- Section of the Cerrejón coal mine
- Type: Geological formation
- Unit of: Cesar-Ranchería Basin
- Sub-units: Lower, middle, upper
- Underlies: Tabaco Formation
- Overlies: Manantial Formation
- Thickness: Up to 750 m (2,460 ft)

Lithology
- Primary: Coal, mudstone, siltstone
- Other: Sandstone

Location
- Coordinates: 11°05′22″N 72°40′31″W
- Region: La Guajira, Northern Cesar
- Country: Colombia

Type section
- Named for: Cerrejón
- Named by: Hammen
- Location: Cerrejón
- Year defined: 1958
- Coordinates: 11°05′22″N 72°40′31″W
- Approximate paleocoordinates: 8.5°N 59.2°W
- Region: La Guajira
- Country: Colombia
- Cerrejón Formation (Colombia)

The Cerrejón Formation is a geologic formation in Colombia dating back to the Middle-Late Paleocene. It is found in the El Cerrejón sub-basin of the Cesar-Ranchería Basin of La Guajira and Cesar. The formation consists of bituminous coal fields that are an important economic resource. Coal from the Cerrejón Formation is mined extensively from the Cerrejón open-pit coal mine, one of the largest in the world. The formation also bears fossils that are the earliest record of Neotropical rainforests.

== Definition ==
The formation was first named Septarias Formation and in 1958 renamed to Cerrejón Formation by Thomas van der Hammen, probably based on an earlier report by Notestein.

== Geology ==
The Cerrejón Formation, with an assigned total thickness of 750 metres (2,460 ft), is subdivided into lower, middle, and upper groups based on the thickness and distribution of coal beds. On average the coal beds are 3 metres (9.8 ft) thick, and range from 0.7 metres (2.3 ft) to 10 metres (33 ft) in thickness. The thickest beds are in the upper part of the formation. The Cerrejón Formation is laterally equivalent with the Los Cuervos and Bogotá Formations to the south; Llanos Orientales and Altiplano Cundiboyacense respectively. The formation is also time-equivalent with the Marcelina Formation of the Venezuelan Serranía del Perijá and the Catatumbo Formation of the southwestern Colombian part of the Maracaibo Basin, the Catatumbo Basin. The formation has also been described as laterally equivalent to the Mostrencos and Santa Cruz Formations of Venezuela.

Based on lithofacies associations and paleofloral composition, the depositional environment fluctuated from an estuarine-influenced coastal plain at the base of the formation to a fluvial-influenced coastal plain at the top.

In the geologically recent past, some coal in the formation has spontaneously and naturally combusted to form clinker, red and brick-looking burnt coal. These rocks outcrop irregularly and are up to 100 metres (330 ft) thick. Clinker is found near deformed zones such as faults or tight folds, and is older than the deformities themselves. They are thought to have combusted after the development of the Cerrejón thrust fault and alluvial fan.

== Paleoenvironment ==
Fossils found from the Cerrejón Formation are the earliest record of Neotropical rainforests, with an abundance of plant macrofossils and palynomorphs. The Cerrejón Formation also records a riverine vertebrate fauna that includes lungfish, turtles, snakes, and crocodyliforms. Based on these fossils and the stratigraphy of the formation, the Cerrejón Formation was likely formed on a coastal plain, covered in a wet tropical rainforest and incised by a large river system.

The rainforest is estimated to have been around 5°N paleolatitude. During the Paleocene, equatorial temperatures were much higher than they are today. Based on the size of the giant boid Titanoboa, specimens of which have been found in the Cerrejón Formation, the mean annual temperature of Paleocene equatorial South America was between 30 °C (86 °F) and 34 °C (93 °F). This is the minimum annual temperature range that a poikilotherm as large as Titanoboa could live. It is consistent with Paleocene climate models which predict greenhouse temperatures and an atmospheric pCO_{2} concentration of around 2,000 parts per million. Paleotemperature estimates based on fossil leaf assemblages from the Cerrejón Formation predict the mean annual temperature to be 6 to 8 °C (11 to 14 °F) lower than other estimates. However, such temperature estimates based on riparian and wetland rainforest paleoflora have been considered underestimates.

Mean annual temperatures of 30 to 34 °C (86 to 93 °F) are considered to be too high for modern tropical forests, but the Cerrejón rainforest could have been maintained by increased atmospheric pCO_{2} levels and the high regional rainfall, which is estimated to have been around 4 metres (13 ft) per year.

=== Flora ===
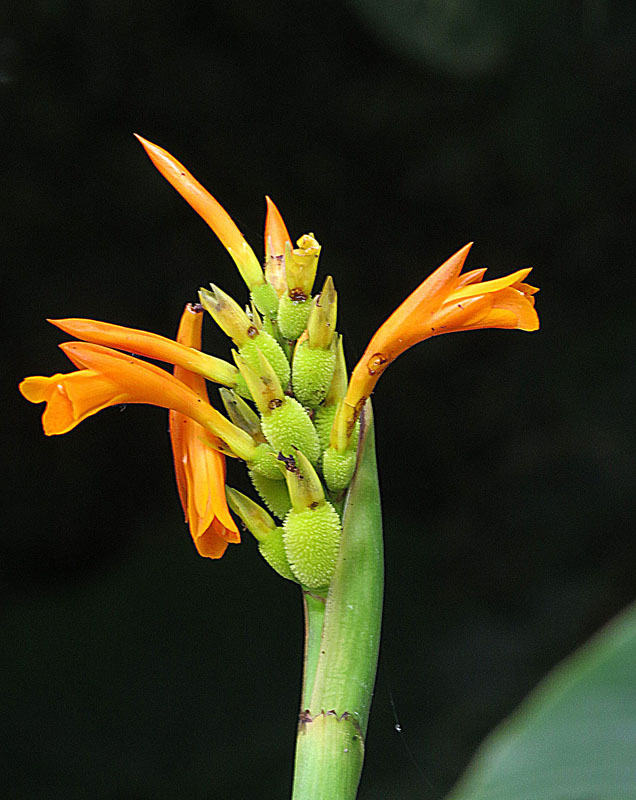
Fossil Zingiberales have been uncovered from the Cerrejón Formation

The floral record of the Cerrejón Formation is well known, with many identifiable and well preserved plant microfossils having been found from the Cerrejón mine. The fossils are well preserved, and in some cases their cell structure is intact. In comparison to modern Neotropical rainforests, the diversity of plants is quite low. This may be an indication of the early stage of Neotropical diversification, or a delayed recovery period following the Cretaceous–Paleogene extinction event.

Many plants from the Cerrejón Formation belong to families that are still common today in modern Neotropical rainforests. There is a diverse variety of palms and legumes in the formation. In addition to palms and legumes, much of the biomass of the Paleocene forest consisted of laurales, malvales, menisperms, aroids, zingiberaleans, cocoa bean plants,banana plants, and avocado plants. Studies of fossil plants from Cretaceous-age sites indicate that the floral composition below the Cretaceous–Paleogene boundary (K–T boundary) was very different from that of the Paleocene. Legumes are absent from Cretaceous strata, and likely appeared or diversified during the Paleocene.

The presence of these types of flora in Paleocene strata shows that plants characteristic of modern Neotropical rainforests have existed for geologically long periods of time, being able to withstand climatic and geographic changes in South America. It has been suggested that today's Neotropical rainforests are the result of environmental changes brought about by Quaternary glacial cycles (i.e. the recent ice age). These cycles would have caused fluctuation in the diversity and extent of rainforests. If this was the case, the current diversity of the Amazon rainforest would be a recent speciation in a changing environment. However, the floral record from the Cerrejón Formation shows that the current diversity of the Amazon Rainforest can be traced back into the early Cenozoic.

=== Fauna ===
Feeding damage from insects is evident on some of the plant macrofossils from the Cerrejón Formation. One survey of plant macrofossils showed that around half of the studied specimens had been attacked by herbivorous insects. The insects that damaged the leaves were predominantly generalist feeders, unlike modern Neotropical insects that are mainly specialist herbivores. There is no evidence of the elevated insect-feeding diversity or host-specialized feeding associations that are seen in later Neotropical forests. The insect diversity in the Cerrejón Formation is low in comparison to the diversity of insects in Neotropical rainforests today, and it is likely that leaf damage was made by relatively few species.

==== Squamata ====
Squamates from the Cerrejón Formation
| Genus | Species | Material | Notes | Images |
|---|---|---|---|---|
| Titanoboa | T. cerrejonensis | Multiple specimens | A giant boid (boa) | |
| Palaeophiidae indet. | Indeterminate | Vertebrae | A giant palaeophiid snake | |

==== Crocodylomorpha ====
Crocodylomorphs from the Cerrejón Formation
| Genus | Species | Material | Notes | Images |
|---|---|---|---|---|
| Cerrejonisuchus | C. improcerus | Cranial material and partial postcranial skeleton | A fairly small dyrosaurid with a short snout | |
| Acherontisuchus | A. guajiraensis | Cranial material | A large dyrosaurid with a long, narrow snout | |
| Anthracosuchus | A. balrogus | Cranial and postcranial material | A medium-sized dyrosaurid with a short, broad snout | |

==== Testudines ====
Testudines from the Cerrejón Formation
| Genus | Species | Material | Notes | Images |
|---|---|---|---|---|
| Carbonemys | C. cofrinii | A skull | A very large podocnemidid turtle | |
| Cerrejonemys | C. wayuunaiki | Skull, coracoid, pelvic girdle, cervical vertebrae, and plastron and shell material | A podocnemidid turtle | |
| Puentemys | P. mushainensis | Skull and shell material | A very large bothremydid turtle | |

== Coal resources ==
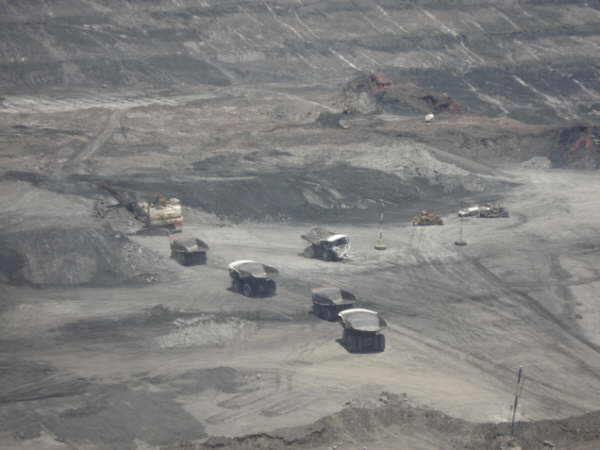
Coal mining in the Cerrejón open-pit mine

The Cerrejón Formation contains extensive coal seams that are mined primarily at the Cerrejón mine. The coal is desirable for its low ash and sulfur content and for its resistance to caking. Cerrejón is Colombia's largest coal producing mine, with most of the production exported to Europe. It is the largest coal mining operation in Latin America, with an estimated 28.4 million tons mined in 2006.

== Itaboraian correlations ==
Itaboraian correlations in South America
| Formation | Itaboraí | Las Flores | Koluel Kaike | Maíz Gordo | Muñani | Mogollón | Bogotá | Cerrejón | Ypresian (IUCS) • Wasatchian (NALMA) Bumbanian (ALMA) • Mangaorapan (NZ) |
| Basin | Itaboraí | Golfo San Jorge | | Salta | Altiplano Basin | Talara & Tumbes | Altiplano Cundiboyacense | Cesar-Ranchería | Cerrejón Formation (South America) |
| Country | Brazil | Argentina | | | Peru | | Colombia | | Cerrejón Formation (South America) |
|---|---|---|---|---|---|---|---|---|---|
| Carodnia | | | | | | | | | Cerrejón Formation (South America) |
| Gashternia | | | | | | | | | Cerrejón Formation (South America) |
| Henricosbornia | | | | | | | | | Cerrejón Formation (South America) |
| Victorlemoinea | | | | | | | | | Cerrejón Formation (South America) |
| Polydolopimorphia | | | | | | | | | Cerrejón Formation (South America) |
| Birds | | | | | | | | | Cerrejón Formation (South America) |
| Reptiles | | | | | | | | | Cerrejón Formation (South America) |
| Fish | | | | | | | | | Cerrejón Formation (South America) |
| Flora | | | | | | | | | Cerrejón Formation (South America) |
| Environments | Alluvial-lacustrine | Alluvial-fluvial | | Fluvio-lacustrine | Lacustrine | Fluvial | Fluvio-deltaic | | Itaboraian volcanoclastics Itaboraian fauna Itaboraian flora |
| Volcanic | | | Yes | | | | | | Itaboraian volcanoclastics Itaboraian fauna Itaboraian flora |
