= Agustín Codazzi, Cesar =

Agustín Codazzi Espíritu Santo y del Pueblo
- Municipality and town
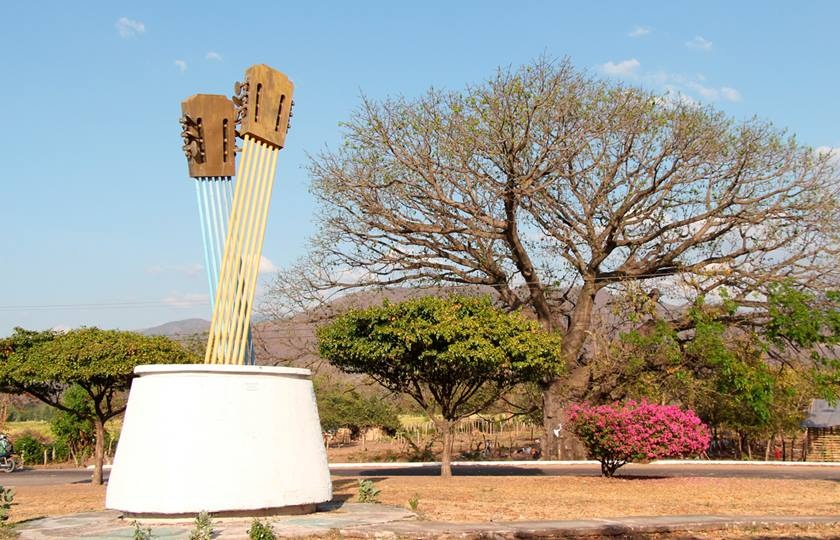

- Flag Coat of arms

- Location of the municipality and town of Agustin Codazzi in the Department of Cesar.

- Location in Colombia
- Coordinates: 10°02′12″N 73°14′13″W
- Country: Colombia
- Region: Caribbean
- Department: Cesar
- Founded: 1700
- Founder: Salvador Félix Arias

Government
  - Mayor: Luis 'Luchito' Vladimir Peñaloza Fuetes (2016-2019)

Area
  - Municipality and town: 1,739 km^{2} (671 sq mi)
  - Urban: 11.74 km^{2} (4.53 sq mi)
- Elevation: 131 m (430 ft)

Population (2018 census)
  - Municipality and town: 60,768
  - Density: 34.94/km^{2} (90.51/sq mi)
  - Urban: 48,157
  - Urban density: 4,102/km^{2} (10,620/sq mi)
- Time zone: UTC-5
- Website: Official website

Agustín Codazzi, or simply Codazzi, is a city and municipality of the Department of Cesar in Colombia. It was founded in 1784 by the Spanish Captain Salvador Felix de Arias with the name of El Pueblito del Espíritu Santo but later renamed after the Italian cartographer Agostino Codazzi, who died in this place in 1859. It is located along the Serranía del Perijá, covering some of the area pertaining to the valley of the Cesar River.

In 1958 Codazzi was proclaimed a municipality due to its rapid population increase in the 1950s and 1960s, triggered by an agricultural boom of cotton, that attracted people searching for jobs from many departments of Colombia; mainly from Tolima, Huila, Santander, North Santander, Antioquia, Cundinamarca, Bolivar and Magdalena.

When this boom ended, the agroindustry opted for other products like palm, sugar cane, liquors and milk products. In 2005 the municipality of Codazzi had approximately 52,219 inhabitants.

== Symbols ==
=== Coat of arms ===
The coat of arms of the city is divided into four parts: the upper left shows an allegory of the religious festivals of the divine shepherdess; in the top right are the mountains of Perija; the bottom part shows the fruits and products of agriculture such as coffee, corn and cotton flowing from the horns, like the bows and arrows that make memories to the Yukpa tribe, ancient inhabitants of their territory.

=== Flag ===
The flag of the municipality of Codazzi consists of two colors, white and green. These colors highlight the high elevations of the Perijá mountains and cotton farming.

=== Other symbols ===
Cotton is one of the symbols of the municipality for which it was called the white city of Colombia and that led to the highlight of Agustín Codazzi when this crop (between 1958 and 1975), became a Codazzi cotton in the capital of Colombia and earned it the title of White City. In 1960, with 20,980 hectares (51,800 acres) planted, Codazzi became the first domestic producer of cotton, followed distantly by Armero, Tolima, with 14,209 hectares (35,110 acres). The area planted reached 60,000 ha (150,000 acres) in 1975, but decreased rapidly with the later cotton crisis.

== History ==
This town in the beginning (1700) was called "Holy Spirit" and Captain Salvador Felix Arias, governor of Province of Santa Marta, founded it on land donated for that purpose (there are versions that Captain Felix Torres founded it in 1784).

These lands were claimed by the local tribes who came from the Serranía del Perijá, forcing the captain to flee Salvador Arias.

The creation of this municipality was given by the division of the municipality of Robles, with the priest Algezares Leandro Maria, who gave the name of Agustín Codazzi, in honor of the military and Italian geographer (year 1958).

The town of Codazzi before reaching a municipality, was known and was part of the remembered Robles, time when the Father Leandro Algezares Maria began the quest for the disaggregation municipal today known nationally and internationally, as Agustín Codazzi or Codazzi simply.

The creation of the municipality of Codazzi was proposed by decree no 179 of February 25, 1958 of the Government of the Department of Magdalena, then approved by Resolution No. 0265 of April 9, 1958 of the Ministry of Government and confirmed by Order No. 122 of November 12, 1958, issued by the Honorable Madeleine Departmental Assembly.

=== Codazzi ===
Augustine (also called Agostino) was son of Domingo Codazzi, draper and Bartolotti Constance. He was born on July 12, 1793, in the city of Lugo (Italy).

During the period 1850–1859, Codazzi traveled through what is now Colombia with the Commission Corográfica, which was a group of geographers and naturalists in charge of mapping the country. But as he prepared to go along what is the Colombian Atlantic coast, a surprise malaria attack led to his death on February 7, 1859, in the town of the Holy Spirit, now called Codazzi in his honor.

== Geography ==
=== Physical description ===
The municipality of Agustín Codazzi is located in the northern part of Cesar approximately 1 hour from the state capital, Valledupar (45 kilometres or 28 miles). It consists of four districts, 23 villages and 42 districts. There are diverse climates in the area because part of its territory forms the mountains of Perijá.

=== Climate ===
Temperatures vary slightly in the region that is located in the tropical domain, where general weather characteristics are high temperatures and low annual thermal oscillation, yet varies also by the altitude of the mountains. The municipality has two rainy seasons and two dry seasons throughout the year; average temperatures range around 19 °C (66 °F), between 4 and 34 °C (39 and 93 °F) are not uncommon during the months of September to January. Hailstorms are present as the municipality is located to the left side of the mountains Serrania del Perijá, and these months have dense rainfall.

As for temperatures, according to data accumulated by the IDEAM in the meteorologic station located just outside the town, the annual temperature is 29.5 °C (85.1 °F), with maximum and minimum range of 24 and 35 °C (75 and 95 °F), the highest temperature recorded in history was 44.5 °C (112.1 °F) on August 29, 2008, and a low of 15 °C (59 °F). The hottest month is July, with an average of 31 °C (88 °F), and the coolest months are December and January to 22 °C (72 °F).

Climate data for Agustín Codazzi (Motilonia Codazzi), elevation 180 m (590 ft), (1981–2010)
Month	Jan	Feb	Mar	Apr	May	Jun	Jul	Aug	Sep	Oct	Nov	Dec	Year
Mean daily maximum °C (°F)	35.7 (96.3)	36.3 (97.3)	36.0 (96.8)	35.1 (95.2)	33.5 (92.3)	33.8 (92.8)	34.6 (94.3)	34.3 (93.7)	33.1 (91.6)	32.5 (90.5)	32.8 (91.0)	34.1 (93.4)	34.3 (93.7)
Daily mean °C (°F)	29.5 (85.1)	30.2 (86.4)	30.3 (86.5)	29.6 (85.3)	28.6 (83.5)	28.6 (83.5)	29.1 (84.4)	28.8 (83.8)	28.0 (82.4)	27.5 (81.5)	27.7 (81.9)	28.2 (82.8)	28.8 (83.8)
Mean daily minimum °C (°F)	22.3 (72.1)	23.4 (74.1)	24.0 (75.2)	24.6 (76.3)	24.4 (75.9)	24.2 (75.6)	23.9 (75.0)	24.0 (75.2)	23.8 (74.8)	23.7 (74.7)	23.4 (74.1)	22.5 (72.5)	23.7 (74.7)
Average precipitation mm (inches)	22.6 (0.89)	36.5 (1.44)	80.1 (3.15)	149.7 (5.89)	207.0 (8.15)	149.2 (5.87)	111.7 (4.40)	153.9 (6.06)	193.2 (7.61)	258.9 (10.19)	171.9 (6.77)	63.2 (2.49)	1,597.9 (62.91)
Average precipitation days	2	3	6	11	16	13	12	16	17	17	13	4	129
Average relative humidity (%)	61	60	63	70	76	75	72	73	77	80	78	69	71
Mean monthly sunshine hours	282.1	234.3	226.3	189.0	179.8	183.0	204.6	201.5	177.0	186.0	207.0	248.0	2,518.6
Mean daily sunshine hours	9.1	8.3	7.3	6.3	5.8	6.1	6.6	6.5	5.9	6.0	6.9	8.0	6.9
Source: Instituto de Hidrologia Meteorologia y Estudios Ambientales

=== Limits of the municipality ===
Borders on the north in the municipality are at La Paz and San Diego, on the south at the municipality of Becerril, on the west with the municipality of El Paso, and the east with the Serranía del Perijá, serving as a natural limit between Colombia and Venezuela.

== Political-administrative structure ==
Agustín Codazzi is the capital of the homonymous municipality and in turn is one of the main cities of the Department of Cesar. The municipality is divided into 4 districts, 23 villages, 42 districts, one urban and one whole family.

=== Administrative divisions ===
- Casacara
- Llerasca
- San Jacinto
- Sicarare

=== Administrative sub-divisions ===
- La Aguacatera
- Agua bonita
- Alto Sicarare
- Arroyo Seco
- Los Manguitos
- Fernambuco Medio
- Zorro Cuco
- La Europa
- Punta Arrecha
- Candela Abajo
- Coco Solo
- Candela
- Caño Frio
- El Paraiso
- El Once
- Espíritu Santo
- El Milagro
- El Zaino
- Iroka
- Loma fresca
- La Duda
- Buenos Aires
- Begoña
- Caño Seco
- La Palizada
- Las Vegas
- La Sonora
- La Frontera
- Nueve de Abril
- Makencal
- San Jacinto
- Sicarare Medio
- Sicarare Bajo
- San Miguel
- Siete de Agosto
- El Pozón
- Platanal
- Fernambuco
- Terranova
- La Hondina
- La Esperanza
- La Iberia
- Hoyo Caliente
- Carrizal
- Guamal

=== Neighborhoods ===
- Atanasio Giralrdot
- Aida Quintero
- Buenos Aires
- El Bosque
- El Centro
- El Carmen
- El Tesorro
- El Socorro
- Las Delicias
- La Antillana
- Las Flores
- Martinez Barboza
- Primero de Mayo
- Camilo Torres
- 15 de Noviembre
- San Vicente
- San Ramón
- Santa María
- San José
- El Estadio
- Santa Rita
- José Antonio Galán
- Villa Esther
- Las Palmeras
- Barrio Nuevo
- El Juguete
- Los Laureles
- Machiques
- Las Margaritas
- El Obrero
- La Frontera Uno
- La Frontera Dos

=== Branches of government ===
In Agustín Codazzi, legal matters are at the first municipal court of the attorney general of the nation. At the municipal level, executive power is exercised by the Mayor and City Council, elected by popular vote for a four-year period.

=== Defense ===
Police

The city houses the Municipal Police Department, which coordinates all activities aimed at controlling and maintaining public safety. The National Police Colombia in Agustín Codazzi has personnel assigned to patrol roads, setting up checkpoints and surveillance of public events in the city are particularly busy at times of the Festival Vallenato Played on Guitars and Livestock Show.

Army

In the jurisdiction of Agustín Codazzi is the artillery battalion for high mountains, attached to the 10th Brigade of the National Army of Colombia.

=== Valledupar Metropolitan ===
The municipality of Agustín Codazzi project is part of Valledupar metropolitan area as the conurbation that has at its core to Valledupar; its other members are: Agustín Codazzi, Peace, Manaure Balcon del Cesar, San Diego. It was created in 2005 and has an estimated total population by DANE in 2010 of 504,868 inhabitants.

=== Transport ===
==== Road infrastructure ====
The road network Agustín Codazzi is structured as a hexagon whose center is the race 16. The city uses three national highways: north, from Valledupar through the roundabout guitars, on the south, the road is entered from Bucaramanga - Augustine Codazzi, to the north is the national route linking with San Diego, Valledupar and Guajira. Other roads and a four-lane dual carriageway are the Eastern Alternative.

==== Urban transport ====
In Agustín Codazzi, there are urban transport undertakings: Cootraturiscod, this company is cooperative and intercommunicate type for different city neighborhoods, especially towards the center where they develop the administrative, financial and commercial city.

==== Intermunicipal transportation ====
Agustín Codazzi is served by companies covering permanent routes especially Valledupar, La Guajira, Aguachica, Bucaramanga and the mining area and the rest of the department.

==== Interdepartmental transportation ====
Agustín Codazzi has long-range transport companies with regular daily departures to: Bogotá, Bucaramanga, Cartagena, Riohacha, and the surrounding towns.

=== Energy ===
There is a substation located west of the city belonging to the company that distributes electricity, Transelca, for 100% of households Codacenses; electrical energy distributed in the city belongs to the national electrical interconnection. Since the incoming administration begins to think about the development of large enterprises and promoting industry, but the municipality currently has no such capacity despite large coal deposits nearby.

=== Drinking water and sanitation ===
Aqueduct

In the city of Agustín Codazzi, water service coverage is 95%. Water is taken from the river Magiriaimo, and service delivery is in charge of the business department "Aguas del Cesar".

Sewerage

Agustín Codazzi has a 97% sewerage coverage. The residual water is driven home through underground piping to two systems of wastewater treatment. Wastewater from the city receives primary and secondary treatments that leave the water suitable for dumping at Cesar River.

Solid waste management

The collection, transportation and disposal of solid waste is handled by the company Interaseo SA ESP. The home collection is performed by a fleet of 16 trucks and 25 compactors cubic yards, the company has for the ongoing sweep city streets and public spaces by personnel directly on the streets. For final disposal has Municipal Landfill located in northeastern recently rebuilt and operated efficiently without compromising the environment or public health.

=== Education ===
In the city there are located one CERES, as a city in the Regional Headquarters of the Popular University of Cesar (UPC), with different careers grouped in faculties of Engineering and Technology (Agribusiness Professional Technical, Professional Technical Professional and Technical Systems in Electronics), also is expected to begin in a few years issued valuable career regionally and nationally.

=== Ecology ===
As a scientific discipline the ecology cannot dictate what is "good" or "bad", even so, consider that the maintenance of the biodiversity and goals have provided the scientific basis for expressing the aims of environmentalism and also has provided the methodology and terminology to express environmental problems.

In the municipality of Agustín Codazzi, there is great interest in the preservation of the animals and plants, and have been campaigning for the preservation of the tributaries of the river Margiriaimo, which in their streams generate an ecosystem rich in various species of plants and animals.

== Economy ==
It was known as the "white city of Colombia" for being located on a region that was leading production in the cotton era.

Agustin Codazzi, despite having lived in its passing various landmarks such as the cotton boom and having suffered the violence of armed groups outside the law, is now a municipality that is projected as the capital agriculture energy Colombia, because in his jurisdiction is located on the first floor of biodiesel of Colombia and one of the first of Latin, similarly, is looming assembly plant Alcohol fuel from the culture of cassava industry.

In addition, it is part of one of the projects coal s the world's largest known as "The Rest", which will allow the multinational "Drummond" produce 50 million tonnes per year. This, without neglecting the agricultural and livestock that has always characterized the area, noting that it is the first municipality coffee producer in the Caribbean Region of Colombia, with more than 5,700 ha (14,000 acres), is the second largest city in breeding Cesar cattle heads over 132,000 and holds great potential fruit of Serrania existing in the Perijá.

== Tourism ==
The Magiriaimo River is one of the sights of the town, and its surroundings having great diversity of plant and animal species, yet the hotel industry is not very important, and therefore its low growth, on the other hand in the municipality takes its own. The Vallenato festival, played on guitars, and the livestock fair attract large numbers of visitors from neighboring areas, mainly in Valledupar. These festivals are held in the months of August and November, respectively; during these days hotel occupancy can get to 100%.

It is expected that in the coming years the municipality will have an "ECO-PARK" in the Perijá to protect flora, fauna and water sources found in the heights of the mountains, and this in turn would attract large numbers tourists naturaleza. With the coal boom and agro-energy in the area, the hotel sector has decent growth for the coming years.

=== Festival Vallenato Music on Guitar ===
The municipality of Agustín Codazzi's main cultural and tourist event is the Festival Vallenato Music on Guitar. Established in 1987 in the air of traditional music trios, ride and merengue. It has run over 27 years and is made in the middle of August. It also celebrates the festivities of the "Virgin Divina Pastora".

It is listed by the Ministry of Culture as one of the 17 traditional music festivals that are most important in the country. It was the first of its kind nationwide.

Importantly, the event has a great acceptance by national guitarists and composers, and year after year has been increasing the number of participants, which has allowed the interest of the media for coverage and dissemination of the event.

== Twin cities ==
- Lugo, Italy
