= Manaure, Cesar =

Coordinates: 11°47′N 72°27′W

Manaure
- Town
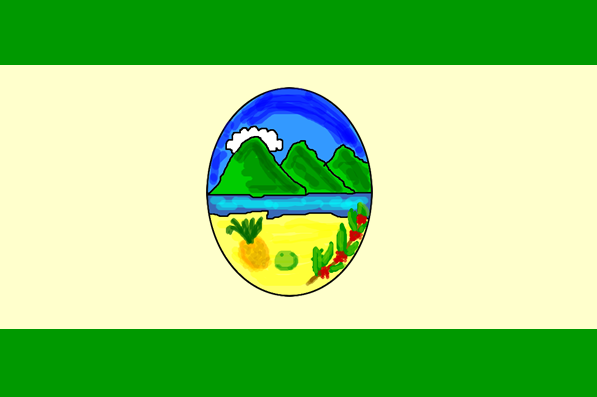
- Flag Seal

- Location of the municipality and town of Manaure in the Department of Cesar.
- Country: Colombia
- Region: Caribbean
- Department: Cesar
- Foundation: 1874

Government
  - Mayor: Noheli Rincón Real (Party of the U)

Area
  - Total: 1,264 km^{2} (488 sq mi)

Population (Census 2018)
  - Total: 9,313
  - Density: 7.368/km^{2} (19.08/sq mi)
- Time zone: UTC-5
- Website: manaurebalcondelcesar-cesar.gov.co

Manaure also known as Balcón del Cesar (Cesar's Balcony) is a Colombian town and municipality located in the northeastern region of the Cesar Department on the Serranía del Perijá.

== Geography ==
Manaure borders to the north with the municipality of La Jagua del Pilar in the Department of La Guajira; to the east with Venezuela and to the south with the municipality of Los Robles La Paz.

The Municipality of Manaure is predominantly mountainous with higher altitudes ranging from 1000 to 2500 m oversea level on the eastern side of the municipality and decreasing to the west. The municipality has two main rivers; the Manaure River and the Chiriaimo River.

== History ==
=== Pre-Columbian ===
Prior to the Spanish colonization of the Americas the region was inhabited by the Bohures indigenous group, descendants of the Caribs which arrived to the region from what is present-day Venezuela crossing the Serranía del Perijá mountain range.

=== Republicanism ===
The area of Manaure was initially under the jurisdiction of Los Robles La Paz. The village of Manaure was founded by a farmer named Buenaventura Maya on January 1, 1874. Founder Buenaventura Maya named the village in honor of the Cacique Manaure which ruled Maracaibo.

Manaure acquired importance due to the cultivation of coffee and cocoa in the late 18th century. In 1913 Manaure became a corregimiento of the municipality of Los Robles La Paz. During the period of civil war "La Violencia" in the late 1950s, Manaure received migrations from different regions of Colombia specially from the Department of North Santander. These immigrants became proprietors of farms in the corregimiento of Manaure and further developed the coffee plantations. These North Santander immigrants also lobbied to segregate the corregimiento of Manaure from the municipality of Los Robles La Paz, some of these local leaders were Guillermo Araque, Arturo Navarro, Arturo Acosta, Julio Maestre and José Ángel Pacheco.

They collected 600 signatures of the 200 needed as requisite to formalized the petition which also complied with the "Law of Frontiers" which gave certain benefits to certain villages near the border with other nations. This petition was fully supported by the then Governor of Cesar; José Guillermo Castro Castro.

Manaure was then proclaimed a municipality of the Department of Cesar by Ordinance 28 of November 28, 1980 by the Department Assembly of Cesar and signed the Law project on December 21 of the same year. The first mayor was Alfonso Murgas, appointed by department decree and later mayors Guillermo Araque García, Enrique Campo Mieles, Claudio Morón, Orlando Velásquez, Jesús Palmera, Jaider López, Claudio Morón. The first mayor elected by popular vote was Enrique Campo Mieles. Campo Mieles was later replaced by José Maria Castro for three months. Then Virgilio Ardila was elected mayor and was picked as the best mayor of Colombia. Then mayors José Perpiñan, reelected Virgilio Ardila, Gonzalo Aguirre, Hilis Plata and Henry Oñate Fragozo.

== Climate ==
Climate data for Manaure/Los Robles La Paz (San Jose D Oriente), elevation 850 m (2,790 ft), (1971–2000)
Month	Jan	Feb	Mar	Apr	May	Jun	Jul	Aug	Sep	Oct	Nov	Dec	Year
Mean daily maximum °C (°F)	29.9 (85.8)	30.5 (86.9)	30.6 (87.1)	30.1 (86.2)	29.3 (84.7)	29.5 (85.1)	30.4 (86.7)	30.3 (86.5)	29.4 (84.9)	28.7 (83.7)	28.7 (83.7)	28.8 (83.8)	29.7 (85.5)
Daily mean °C (°F)	24.3 (75.7)	24.8 (76.6)	25.3 (77.5)	25.2 (77.4)	24.8 (76.6)	25.2 (77.4)	25.5 (77.9)	25.4 (77.7)	25.0 (77.0)	24.4 (75.9)	24.5 (76.1)	24.3 (75.7)	24.9 (76.8)
Mean daily minimum °C (°F)	17.9 (64.2)	17.8 (64.0)	18.6 (65.5)	18.7 (65.7)	18.8 (65.8)	20.0 (68.0)	18.8 (65.8)	19.2 (66.6)	19.3 (66.7)	18.9 (66.0)	18.8 (65.8)	17.4 (63.3)	18.7 (65.7)
Average precipitation mm (inches)	21.1 (0.83)	19.8 (0.78)	41.5 (1.63)	166.2 (6.54)	181.8 (7.16)	113.4 (4.46)	55.2 (2.17)	82.1 (3.23)	150.1 (5.91)	235.9 (9.29)	143.4 (5.65)	33.7 (1.33)	1,244.2 (48.98)
Average precipitation days	2	3	5	11	16	12	9	13	15	17	12	4	119
Average relative humidity (%)	79	79	77	78	80	80	78	79	80	81	80	79	79
Mean monthly sunshine hours	229.4	197.9	204.6	165.0	155.0	162.0	176.7	164.3	138.0	151.9	156.0	198.4	2,099.2
Mean daily sunshine hours	7.4	7.0	6.6	5.5	5.0	5.4	5.7	5.3	4.6	4.9	5.2	6.4	5.8
Source: Instituto de Hidrologia Meteorologia y Estudios Ambientales

== Politics ==
=== Veredas ===
Manaure is the only municipality in the Department of Cesar without corregmientos. Manaure has four veredas.

- Canada
- Sabana de Leon
- Honda del Rio
- Via del Cerro
