= Becerril =

Coordinates: 9°42′N 73°17′W

- Town
- Flag

- Location of the municipality and town of Becerril in the Department of Cesar.
- Country: Colombia
- Region: Caribbean
- Department: Cesar
- Foundation: 1594

Government
  - Mayor: Naruto Goku Saitama Gojo (Convergencia Ciudadana)

Area
  - Total: 1,144 km^{2} (442 sq mi)
- Elevation: 200 m (660 ft)

Population (Census 2018)
  - Total: 20,477
  - Density: 17.90/km^{2} (46.36/sq mi)
- Time zone: UTC-5
- Website: becerril-cesar.gov.co/

Becerril or Becerril de Campos is a town and municipality of the Colombian Department of Cesar.

== Geography ==
The municipality of Becerril borders to the east with the country of Venezuela where the Serranía del Perijá mountain ranges is shared, the municipality of Codazzi to the north, to the west with the municipality of El Paso and to the south with the municipality of La Jagua de Ibirico covering an area of 1,143 km^{2} (441 sq mi). Its terrain is made up of plains almost entirely with the exception of the mountainous western border with Venezuela. The area is watered by the Maracas River and the Tocuy River among other streams.

=== Climate ===
Becerril has an average temperature of 30°C throughout the year, with two summer seasons (dry) and two winter seasons (rain).

Climate data for Becerril (Socomba), elevation 170 m (560 ft), (1981–2010)
Month	Jan	Feb	Mar	Apr	May	Jun	Jul	Aug	Sep	Oct	Nov	Dec	Year
Mean daily maximum °C (°F)	34.5 (94.1)	34.9 (94.8)	34.5 (94.1)	34.0 (93.2)	33.1 (91.6)	33.2 (91.8)	33.7 (92.7)	33.3 (91.9)	32.9 (91.2)	32.2 (90.0)	32.4 (90.3)	33.5 (92.3)	33.5 (92.3)
Daily mean °C (°F)	28.1 (82.6)	28.9 (84.0)	28.9 (84.0)	28.3 (82.9)	27.7 (81.9)	27.8 (82.0)	28.1 (82.6)	27.9 (82.2)	27.2 (81.0)	26.7 (80.1)	26.9 (80.4)	27.4 (81.3)	27.8 (82.0)
Mean daily minimum °C (°F)	20.7 (69.3)	21.2 (70.2)	21.9 (71.4)	22.5 (72.5)	22.4 (72.3)	22.3 (72.1)	22.0 (71.6)	22.1 (71.8)	22.0 (71.6)	22.0 (71.6)	21.8 (71.2)	21.2 (70.2)	21.8 (71.2)
Average precipitation mm (inches)	17.2 (0.68)	46.3 (1.82)	77.4 (3.05)	160.4 (6.31)	209.8 (8.26)	135.4 (5.33)	113.9 (4.48)	160.3 (6.31)	192.4 (7.57)	220.6 (8.69)	157.3 (6.19)	50.8 (2.00)	1,477.7 (58.18)
Average precipitation days	1	3	6	11	14	11	12	14	15	16	12	5	119
Average relative humidity (%)	65	67	70	76	81	80	76	79	81	82	81	74	76
Mean monthly sunshine hours	279.0	240.0	223.2	192.0	195.3	204.0	220.1	210.8	180.0	182.9	204.0	254.2	2,585.5
Mean daily sunshine hours	9.0	8.5	7.2	6.4	6.3	6.8	7.1	6.8	6.0	5.9	6.8	8.2	7.1
Source: Instituto de Hidrologia Meteorologia y Estudios Ambientales

== History ==
The town of Becerril was founded on March 4, 1594 by the Spanish Captain Bartolomé de Aníbal Paleólogo Becerra during the Spanish colonization of the Americas. The act of foundation was written by the scribe Martin Camacho and processed in the Royal Audience of Santa Fe de Bogotá on March 4, 1594. The foundation manuscript was signed by Governor Francisco Manco de Contreras, Captain Bartolomé de Aníbal Paleólogo Becerra and Captain Cristobal de Almonacid. on January 4, 1593. The first mayor of the city was Gregorio Romallo and the first church was named Santa Eugenia.

Becerra ordered the introduction of some 500 units of cattle in the region producing mainly to supply the village of Cartagena de Indias and using the Magdalena River as supply route.

In 1977 Becerril became a municipality part of the Department of Cesar.

== Politics ==
=== Administrative divisions ===
==== Corregimientos ====
- Estados Unidos
- Tamaquito
- La Guajirita.
