= Chiriguaná =

Coordinates: 9°22′N 73°36′W

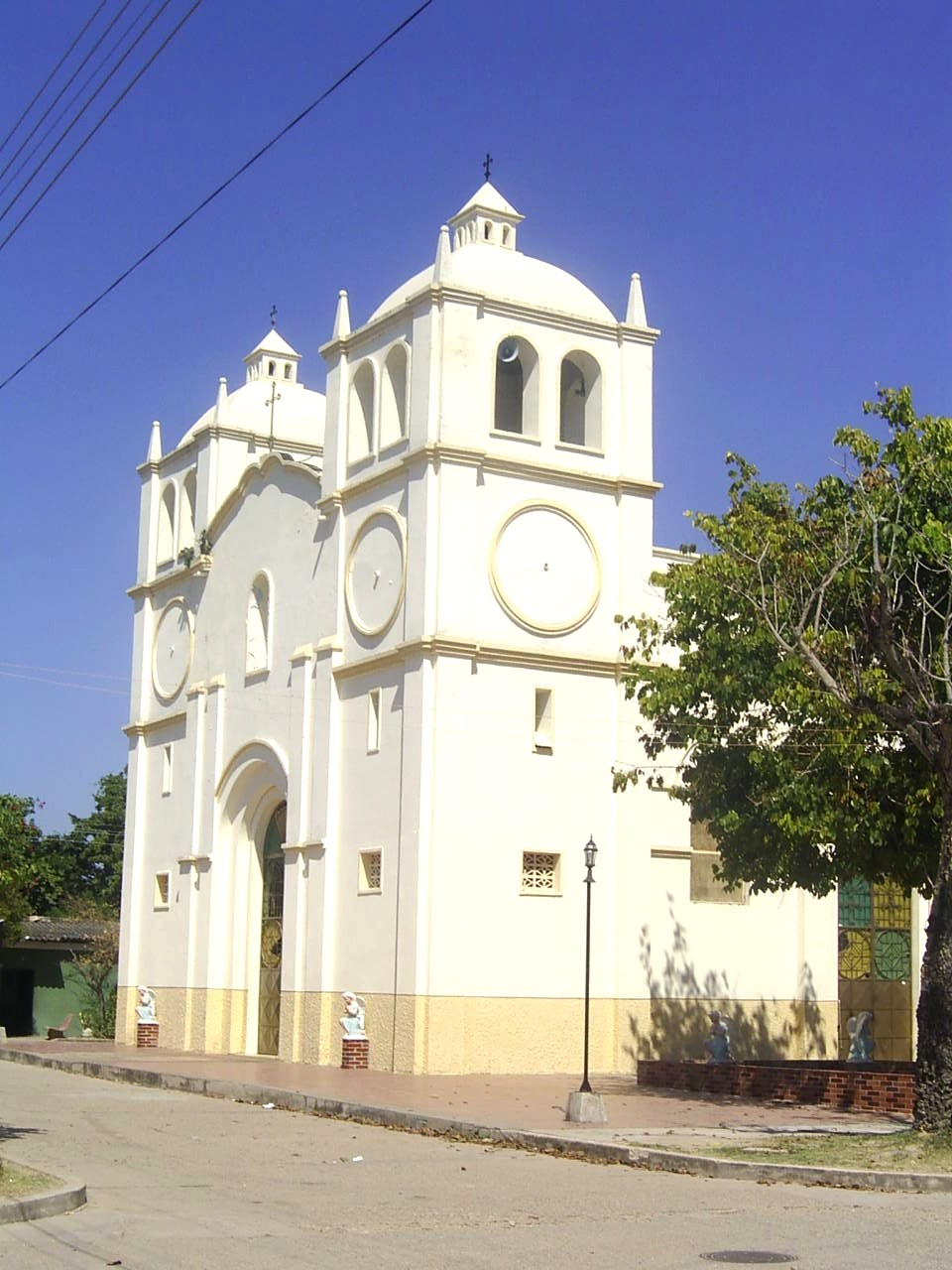
- Chiriguana church

- Flag Coat of arms

- Location of the municipality and town of Chiriguaná in the Department of Cesar.
- Country: Colombia
- Region: Caribbean
- Department: Cesar

Government
  - Mayor: Ramon Diaz (Alas Equipo Colombia)

Area
  - Total: 1,103 km^{2} (426 sq mi)

Population (Census 2018)
  - Total: 27,006
- Time zone: UTC-5
- Website: www.chiriguana-cesar.gov.co/

Chiriguaná (Spanish pronunciation: [tʃiɾiɣwaˈna]) is a city and municipality in the Department of Cesar, Colombia.

== History ==
During the wars independence from Spain Chiriguana was part of the Province of Santa Marta. The people of the village of Chiriguana revolted against the local Spanish monarchical authorities. The Cabildo of Justice and Regiment of the Village of Chiriguana expressed to the Cabildo of Justice of Valledupar and to Maria Concepcion Lopera their efforts to support the independence cause that had begun in 1810 with the first revolt against the Spanish. Members of the Cabildo of Barrancas were Jose Pio del Rio, Braulio de Leiva, Gonzalo de Linares, Pedro Royero and Manuel J. Quintana.

== Climate ==
Chiriguaná has a tropical savanna climate with consistently warm temperatures. Chiriguaná has a wet season from April to November and a drier period from December to March.

Climate data for Chiriguaná, elevation 40 m (130 ft), (1981–2010)
Month	Jan	Feb	Mar	Apr	May	Jun	Jul	Aug	Sep	Oct	Nov	Dec	Year
Mean daily maximum °C (°F)	35.0 (95.0)	36.0 (96.8)	35.5 (95.9)	34.0 (93.2)	32.9 (91.2)	32.8 (91.0)	33.6 (92.5)	33.8 (92.8)	32.5 (90.5)	31.9 (89.4)	32.2 (90.0)	33.4 (92.1)	33.6 (92.5)
Daily mean °C (°F)	28.6 (83.5)	29.1 (84.4)	29.1 (84.4)	28.7 (83.7)	28.1 (82.6)	28.2 (82.8)	28.5 (83.3)	28.5 (83.3)	27.9 (82.2)	27.6 (81.7)	27.7 (81.9)	28.1 (82.6)	28.4 (83.1)
Mean daily minimum °C (°F)	21.2 (70.2)	21.5 (70.7)	21.8 (71.2)	22.1 (71.8)	22.0 (71.6)	22.3 (72.1)	22.4 (72.3)	22.2 (72.0)	21.9 (71.4)	21.9 (71.4)	21.9 (71.4)	21.7 (71.1)	21.9 (71.4)
Average precipitation mm (inches)	16.3 (0.64)	31.4 (1.24)	73.0 (2.87)	191.8 (7.55)	263.6 (10.38)	178.0 (7.01)	167.5 (6.59)	201.2 (7.92)	309.4 (12.18)	342.5 (13.48)	221.6 (8.72)	57.6 (2.27)	2,053.8 (80.86)
Average precipitation days	1	2	4	8	10	7	7	9	11	11	8	3	81
Average relative humidity (%)	72	71	73	78	81	82	79	79	83	84	83	79	79
Mean monthly sunshine hours	272.8	234.3	213.9	192.0	182.9	201.0	226.3	223.2	186.0	189.1	201.0	244.9	2,567.4
Mean daily sunshine hours	8.8	8.3	6.9	6.4	5.9	6.7	7.3	7.2	6.2	6.1	6.7	7.9	7.0
Source: Instituto de Hidrologia Meteorologia y Estudios Ambientales
