= List of massacres in Colombia =

The following is a list of notable massacres in Colombia, defined by the Colombian government as the intentional killing of three or more people in one incident. Most documented massacres have been a part of the wider Colombian conflict (1964–present day).

According to the Grupo de Memoria Histórica (lit. 'Historical Memory Group'), there were 2,505 massacres in Colombia between 1973 and 2008.

== Before 1980 ==
Name	Data	Place	Dead	Injured	Perpetrator	Notes
Putumayo genocide	1879 - 1912	Putumayo Department	32,000 - 40,000+	unknown	Peruvian Amazon Company	Members of the Huitoto, Andoques, Yaguas, Ocaina and Boras groups were hunted and enslaved so they could be used to extract latex. During this time period, several tribes became extinct.
Banana Massacre	6 December 1928	Ciénaga, Magdalena	estimated 47 - 2,000	unknown	Colombian Army	Massacre of striking United Fruit Company workers by the Colombian Army
1939 Gachetá massacre	8 January 1939	Gachetá, Cundinamarca	9	17	uncertain	The details of the event have been controversial, but the official version showed a balance of nine dead and 17 wounded, all related to the Colombian Conservative Party.
Bogotazo	9 April 1948	Bogotá	600 - 3,000	450		Massive riots took place in Bogotá, after the assassination of presidential candidate Jorge Eliécer Gaitán.

== 1980s ==
Name	Data	Place	Dead	Injured	Perpetrator	Notes
1984 Diners Club shooting	November 1985 and January 1984	Otero, Cali	9	5	Jaime Serrano Santibañez Luis Jamer Rodríguez Díaz Francisco Antonio Ruíz Gómez	was a robbery perpetrated by three common criminals in the Otero Building in Cali, Colombia, on December 3, 1984, which left nine dead and five wounded.
Palace of Justice siege	6–7 November, 1985	Palace of Justice, Bogotá	98	Several	19th of April Movement	Members of the 19th of April Movement take over the Palace of Justice, the home of the Supreme Court of Colombia, in hopes of forcing a trial of President Belisario Betancur. 98 people were killed, including 35 militants, 48 soldiers and 11 of the 25 Supreme Court Justices.
Tacueyó massacre	November 1985 and January 1986	Tacueyó, Toribío, Cauca	164	unknown	Ricardo Franco Front	The Tacueyó massacre occurred between November 1985 and January 1986 in the township of Tacueyó, where the guerrilla "Comando Ricardo Franco Frente-Sur" was attacked. The massacre was discovered on December 13, 1985, and was carried out by guerrillas Hernando Pizarro Leongómez and Jose Fedor Rey (alias Javier Delgado) alleging that the 164 guerrillas killed in their own group were, according to them, infiltrators or informers of the National Army of Colombia or the CIA.
Pozzetto massacre	4 December 1986	Bogotá	30 (including the perpetrator)	12	Campo Elías Delgado	Stabbing attack and spree shooting at two apartment buildings and the Restaurante Pozzetto; gunman shot dead by police
Massacre of Trujillo	1988–1994	Trujillo, Valle del Cauca	estimated 245 - 342	unknown	Cali Cartel	Some 245 to 342 people, including unionists and suspected guerrilla supporters, were tortured and dismembered by paramilitaries and the Cali Cartel with the complicity of active members of the Colombian military and police.
"False positives"	c.1988–2010	nationwide	6,402+ (2002–2008)	unknown	Colombian military	Members of the military and civilian collaborators lured poor or mentally impaired civilians to remote parts of the country with offers of work, killed them, and presented them as left wing guerrillas killed in battle, in an effort to inflate body counts.
Honduras and La Negra farms massacre	4 March 1988	Urabá Antioquia, Antioquia	20	unknown	hired assassins under direction of Voltíjeros Battalion of the National Army of Colombia	Murder of banana workers orchestrated by the Voltíjeros Battalion of the National Army of Colombia aided by former members of the Popular Liberation Army and financed by the Association of Farmers and Stockbreeders of Magdalena Medio.
La Mejor Esquina massacre	3 April 1988	Buenavista, Córdoba	28	0	Los Magnificos	28 peasants are killed during an attack by the Los Magníficos gang, a paramilitary group
Segovia massacre	11 November 1988	Segovia, Antioquia	43 - 46	50 - 60+	Muerte a Revolucionarios del Nordeste	The paramilitary group Muerte a Revolucionarios del Nordeste massacres 43-46 people in the urban area of the municipality of Segovia.
La Rochela massacre	18 January 1989	La Rochela, Simacota, Santandar	12	3	hitmen under direction of Rodriguez Gacha	15 judicial officials, who were investigating crimes committed in the area, were rounded up and shot by a group of gunmen sent by Rodriguez Gacha. 12 of the officials were killed, while 3 survived
Avianca Flight 203 bombing	27 November 1989	Cerro Canoas, Soacha, Cundinamarca	110	0	Muñoz Mosquera, Medellín Cartel	The Avianca Flight 203 is bombed en route from Bogotá to Cali. Medellín cartel hitman Dandeny Muñoz Mosquera is convicted for the bombing.
DAS Building bombing	6 December 1989	Bogotá	63	600+	Medellín Cartel	A truck bomb at the DAS headquarters kills 63 people and injures over a 600. The Medellín Cartel was responsible

== 1990s ==
Name	Data	Place	Dead	Injured	Perpetrator	Notes
Villatina massacre	15 November 1992	Medellín, Antioquia	9	0	Colombian National Police	At least eight children and one young adult were killed by the Colombian National Police.
Riofrio massacre	5 October 1993	Riofrío, Valle del Cauca	13	0	Colombian National Army	In the village of El Bosque, Piedras Portugal, 13 ELN guerrillas died in combat with troops from the Palacé Battalion of the III Brigade. They were surprised while they prepared a handstand.
Mapiripán massacre	15–20 July 1997	Mapiripán, Meta	30 - 49	0	United Self-Defense Forces of Colombia	Around 30 to 49 people were killed with chainsaws and machetes by the United Self-Defense Forces of Colombia (AUC)
El Aro Massacre	22 October 1997	Ituango, Antioquia	15 - 17	0	United Self-Defense Forces of Colombia	15 to 17 individuals accused of being leftist supporters of FARC were massacred by AUC
San José del Guaviare massacre	11–12 November 1997	San José del Guaviare, Guaviare	11	0	United Self-Defense Forces of Colombia	A Group of paramilitaries from the Centauros Bloc arrived in the municipality of San José del Guaviare and murdered 11 people.
Barrancabermeja massacre	16 May 1998	Barrancabermeja, Santander	32	unknown	Autodefensas de Santander y el Sur del Cesar	A group of paramilitaries belonging to the armed group Autodefensas de Santander y el Sur del Cesar, Ausac, assassinated seven people and kidnapped 25 others in the surroundings of the city of Barrancabermeja, in the region of Santander
Machuca Massacre	18 October 1998	Machuca, Antioquia	70 - 84	30+	National Liberation Army	Guerrillas belonging to the National Liberation Army (ELN) dynamited an oil pipeline which caused a spreading fire to the village. 70-84 people lost their lives, many of them children.
Villanueva Massacre	8 December 1998	Villanueva, La Guajira	11	0	United Self-Defense Forces of Colombia	11 people were assassinated by members of the United Self-Defense Forces of Colombia (AUC) by orders of Carlos Castaño.
Santo Domingo massacre	13 December 1998	Santo Domingo, Tame, Arauca	17	27	Colombian Aerospace Force	A Colombian Air Force (FAC) helicopter murdered seventeen people in the middle of a confrontation with the Revolutionary Armed Forces of Colombia – People's Army (FARC-EP).
Playón de Orozco massacre	9 January 1999	El Piñón, Magdalena	27	0	United Self-Defense Forces of Colombia	Paramilitaries from the North Block of the AUC shot and killed 27 people and dismembered them
1999 San José del Guaviare massacre	28 July 1999	San José del Guaviare, Guaviare	4	0	uncertain	a group of armed men murdered four people on the road leading from Puerto Arturo to El Retiro, in the municipality of San José del Guaviare.
La Gabarra massacre	21 August 1999	La Gabarra, Tibú, Norte de Santander	estimated 35 - 43	unknown	United Self-Defense Forces of Colombia	A massacre was perpetrated by members of the United Self-Defense Forces of Colombia against alleged members of FARC, killing 35-43 people.

== 2000s ==
Name	Data	Place	Dead	Injured	Perpetrator	Notes
El Salado massacre	16 February 2000	El Salado, Bolívar	60 - 100+	unknown	United Self-Defense Forces of Colombia	Mass murder of residents by United Self-Defense Forces of Colombia.
Reminiscencias dance club shooting	24 June 2000	Bogotá	11	7	Juan de Jesús Lozano Velásquez	Mass shooting by two patrons at the Reminiscencias tavern bar
Macayepo massacre	14 October 2000	Macayepo, Bolívar	15	0	United Self-Defense Forces of Colombia	Mass murder of 15 peasants by Héroes de los Montes de María, a unit of the United Self-Defense Forces of Colombia (AUC)
Chengue Massacre	17 January 2001	Chengue, Ovejas, Sucre	27	0	United Self-Defense Forces of Colombia	27 people are killed with mortars and machetes by AUC
Alto Naya massacre	10 and 13 April 2001	Alto Naya, Cauca	100 estimated	unknown	United Self-Defense Forces of Colombia	A group of more than 100 paramilitaries from the Calima Block of the AUC led by Everth Veloza, alias 'HH', toured the municipalities and territories surrounding the Naya River, located on the borders of Cauca and Valle del Cauca, transporting in trucks, On the way, they murdered peasants who were identified as collaborators with the guerrilla.
2002 Apartadó massacre	26 April 2002	Apartadó, Antioquia	9	2	Revolutionary Armed Forces of Colombia	Members of the fifth and fifty-eighth fronts of the Revolutionary Armed Forces of Colombia (FARC) arrived in the Salsipuedes area in the municipality of Apartadó, Antioquia, entered the Villa Lucía banana plantation, blew up the property, gathered its workers, and after asking them for the site's managers and getting no response, they shot them indiscriminately. Nine people died and two others were injured.
Bojayá massacre	2 May 2002	Bojayá, Chocó	119	98	Revolutionary Armed Forces of Colombia	FARC launches a mortar bomb against a church during combat with AUC, killing at least 119 civilians, 48 of whom were children.
2003 El Nogal Club bombing	7 February 2003	Bogotá	36	200+	Revolutionary Armed Forces of Colombia	A car bomb goes off in the garage of the El Nogal club in Bogotá, killing 36 people and injuring 200+
2003 Neiva bombing	14 February 2003	Neiva, Huila	15	66	Revolutionary Armed Forces of Colombia	The FARC-EP carry out an attack using a house loaded with explosives in Neiva (Huila) with which they intended to assassinate President Álvaro Uribe . 15 people die, including a prosecutor and the sectional captain of intelligence of the Colombian National Police in Neiva, and 66 are injured.
Bahía Portete massacre	16 April 2004	Bahía Portete, La Guajira	12	1	United Self-Defense Forces of Colombia	Murder of 12 members of the Wayuu Indigenous community by paramilitary groups of the United Self-Defense Forces of Colombia (AUC) Wayuu Counter-Insurgency Bloc
2004 La Gabarra massacre	15 June 2004	La Gabarra, Tibú, Norte de Santander	34	0	Revolutionary Armed Forces of Colombia	A Group of men from the 33rd Front of the FARC-EP arrived at the farm located on the Pico de Águila hill, in the district of La Gabarra, in Tibú, Norte de Santander, and murdered 34 peasants.
2004 Cunday massacre	3 September 2004	Cunday, Tolima	4	0	Tequendama Front of the Centauros Bloc	Paramilitaries from the Tequendama Front of the Centauros Bloc murdered four people in the municipality of Cunday, Tolima
Jamundí massacre	21–22 February 2005	Jamundí, Valle del Cauca	11	0	Colombian National Army	Massacre of ten policemen and a civilian by the Colombian National Army.
San José de Apartadó massacre	21–22 February 2005	San José de Apartadó, Apartadó, Antioquia	8	0	Military of Colombia, United Self-Defense Forces of Colombia	Mass murder of five adults and three children by members of the Military of Colombia and United Self-Defense Forces of Colombia
2007 Balsillas massacre	10 June 2007	Balsillas	6	3	Yeimer Alberto Jiménez Rodríguez Jair Farfán Moor	Mass shooting at a military school by 2 soldiers after a dispute
Nariño massacres	4 and 11 February 2009	Nariño Department	27	0	Revolutionary Armed Forces of Colombia	27 indigenous Awás were massacred in two massacres perpetrated by members of the rebel Revolutionary Armed Forces of Colombia

== 2010s ==
Name	Data	Place	Dead	Injured	Perpetrator	Notes
Masacre de Día del Amor y la Amistad	19 September 2010	Medellín, Antioquia	5	8	Los Machacos	Members of Los Machacos gang indiscriminately shot at people in a local store in the Robledo Miramar neighborhood of Medellín. The victims included a teenage couple ages 16 and 17 who were celebrating Love and Friendship Day (Día del Amor y la Amistad).
2013 Cali nightclub shooting	8 November 2013	Cali	8	6	José Luis Mosquera Johan Alexander Mosquera	Two men opened fire on a nightclub, killing eight and injuring six.
Magüí Payán massacre	27 November 2017	Magüí Payán, Nariño	13	1	Colombian National Army Frente Comuneros del Sur	13 civilians are killed in a clash between government forces and members of the 29th front of the Comuneros del Sur faction of FARC dissidents.
2018 Colombia police stations attacks	27–28 January 2018	Bolívar and Atlántico Departments	8	48	National Liberation Army	A series of attacks attributed to the ELN against the National Police in the departments of Atlántico and Bolívar, left a balance of 8 police officers dead and 48 wounded
2019 Bogotá car bombing	17 January 2019	Bogotá	22	68	José Aldemar Rojas Rodríguez (National Liberation Army)	A car bomb entered a police school compound and detonated after hitting a wall

== 2020s ==
Name	Data	Place	Dead	Injured	Perpetrator	Notes
Bogotá prison riot	21 March 2020	La Modelo prison, Bogotá	23	83		At least 23 prisoners were killed and 83 injured during a riot which erupted in La Modelo prison in Bogotá amid fears over spreading of SARS-CoV-2 through prison walls during the COVID-19 pandemic
Arauca, Cauca and Nariño massacres	22 August 2020	Arauca, Cauca and Nariño Departments	28	unknown		Three massacres kill 28 people, in the Arauca, Cauca, and Nariño Departments.
Javier Ordóñez protests	9–10 September 2020	Bogotá	14	400+	National Police of Colombia	Protests following the death of Javier Ordóñez, 42, at the hands of police leave 14 dead and over 400 were injured
2022 Arauca clashes	2 January 2022	Arauca Department	23	unknown	National Liberation Army, Revolutionary Armed Forces of Colombia	23 people were killed in clashes between far-left guerrilla groups in Arauca Department
Tuluá prison riot	28 June 2022	Tuluá, Valle del Cauca Department	52	34		A fire broke out during a riot inside a prison in Tuluá, killing at least 52 people and injuring at least 34
2022 Huila attack	2 September 2022	San Luis, Huila	7	1	FARC dissidents	A police vehicle hit a bomb near the town of Corozal, killing seven police officers and injuring another.
Santander de Quilichao massacre	22 December 2023	Santander de Quilichao, Cauca	5	0	uncertain	Five people were murdered by armed men in two different locations
2026 Cauca bombing	25 April 2026	Cajibío, Cauca	20	47	FARC dissidents	Bombing by the EMC faction of FARC dissidents kills 20 travellers and injures 47 others on a section of the Pan-American Highway.
2026 Bogotá stabbing	24 March 2026	Bogotá	3	0	Cristian Camilo Valencia Hurtado	In the early morning hours in the neighborhood, a triple stabbing occurred, a femicide, and according to the investigation, it was due to a personal conflict.

== See also ==
- Right-wing paramilitarism in Colombia
