= 2000 in Colombia =

- Decades: 1980s; 1990s; 2000s; 2010s; 2020s
- See also: Other events of 2000; Timeline of Colombian history

Events of 2000 in Colombia.

== Incumbents ==
- President: Andrés Pastrana Arango (1998–2002)
- Vice President: Gustavo Bell (1998–2002)

== Events ==
=== January ===
- 13 January – President Pastrana signs the Ottawa Convention, a United Nations treaty banning the use, production, and transfer of personnel landmines.

=== February ===
- 3 February – The United States' Clinton Administration proposes aid to Colombia which would become Plan Colombia.
- 5–6 February – The 2000 South American Cross Country Championships and Central American and Caribbean Cross Country Championships take place in Cartagena de Indias.
- 16-20 February – El Salado massacre: The United Self-Defense Forces of Colombia (AUC) indiscriminately torture and murder more than 100 residents of El Salado, supposedly with the goal of intimidating and punishing those they suspect of being sympathetic with the Revolutionary Armed Forces of Colombia (FARC). As this occurred, members of the Colombian Navy were reportedly present and aware of the slaughter, doing nothing.
- 27 February – The Colombia national football team plays Canada's in the 2000 CONCACAF Gold Cup final in Los Angeles, United States.

=== March ===
- 31 March – The United States House of Representatives passes a 1.3 billion dollar military aid package to Colombia aimed at combatting drug trafficking operations.

=== April ===
- 26 April – A confrontation between AUC members and other prisoners inside La Modelo prison in Bogota escalates to fighting which results in 32 deaths and 17 injuries.

=== May ===
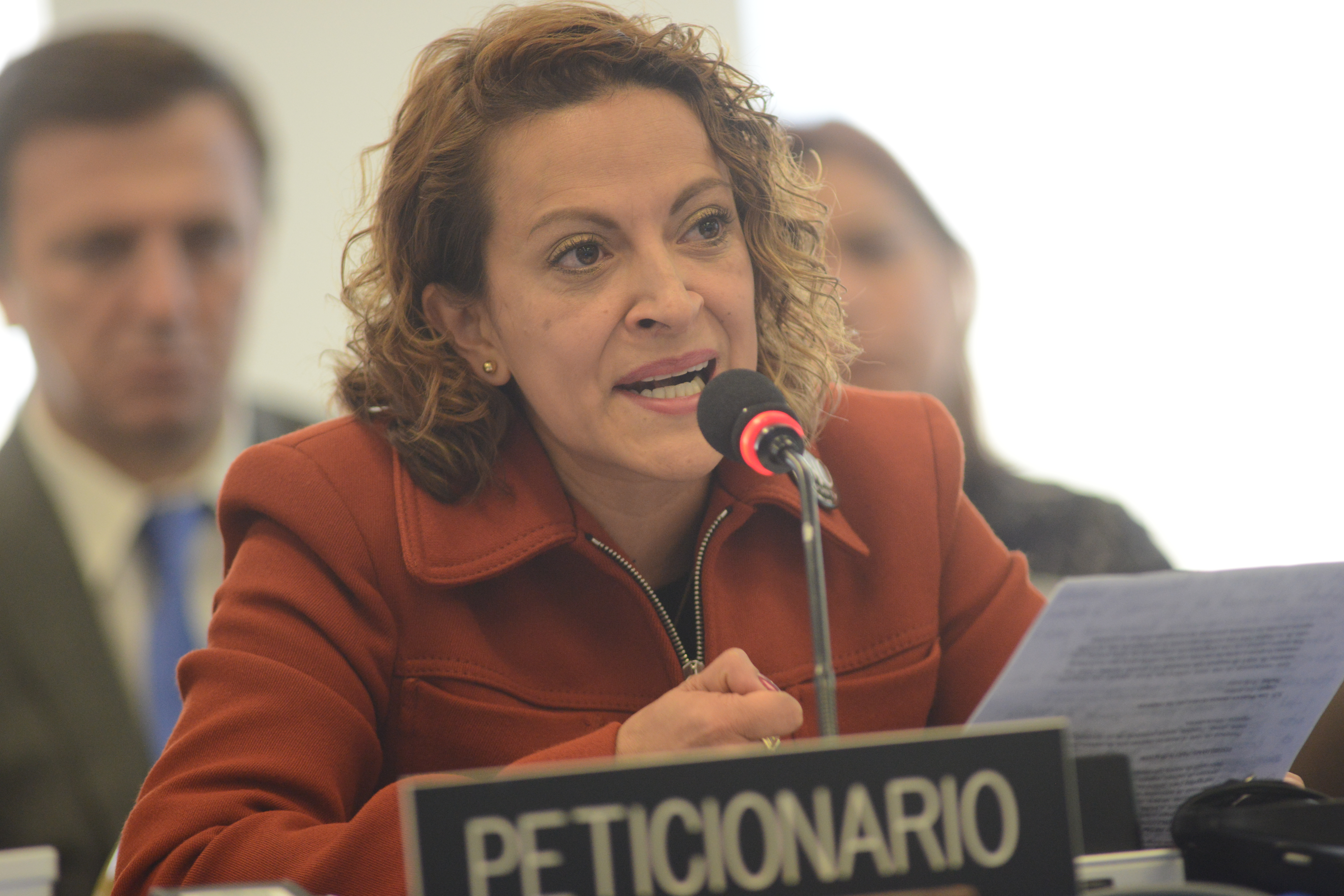
Jineth Bedoya Lima testifying at the Inter-American Commission on Human Rights about her 2000 abduction

- 25 May – El Espectador reporter Jineth Bedoya is abducted by paramilitaries while inside La Modelo maximum security prison in Bogotá. She is driven to a city three hours away and beaten, tortured, threatened, raped, and dumped.

=== June ===
- 11–26 June – The 50th Vuelta a Colombia starts off in Cartagena.
- 24 June – Reminiscencias dance club shooting: Juan de Jesús Lozano Velásquez kills 11 people and injures seven at the Reminiscencias dance club in Bogotá after opening fire with a machine gun.

=== July ===
- 26 July – The Independent Movement for Absolute Renovation (MIRA) party is founded.

=== August ===
- 11–20 August – 2000 Clásico RCN
- 15 August – Colombian armed forces indiscriminately shoot at people in Pueblo Rico, Antioquia for 40 minutes, killing numerous civilians including six elementary school children on a field trip.

=== September ===
- 9 September – Former FARC member Arnubio Ramos hijacks an airplane, landing it in rebel territory.
- 27 September – Colombian Attorney General Alfonso Gomez Mendez advocates for the government to legally allow prisoner exchanges with FARC.

=== October ===
- 14 October – Macayepo massacre: The Héroes de los Montes de María of the United Self-Defense Forces of Colombia (AUC) attack the corregimiento Macayepo, Bolívar, killing 15 residents and displacing over 200 families.

=== November ===
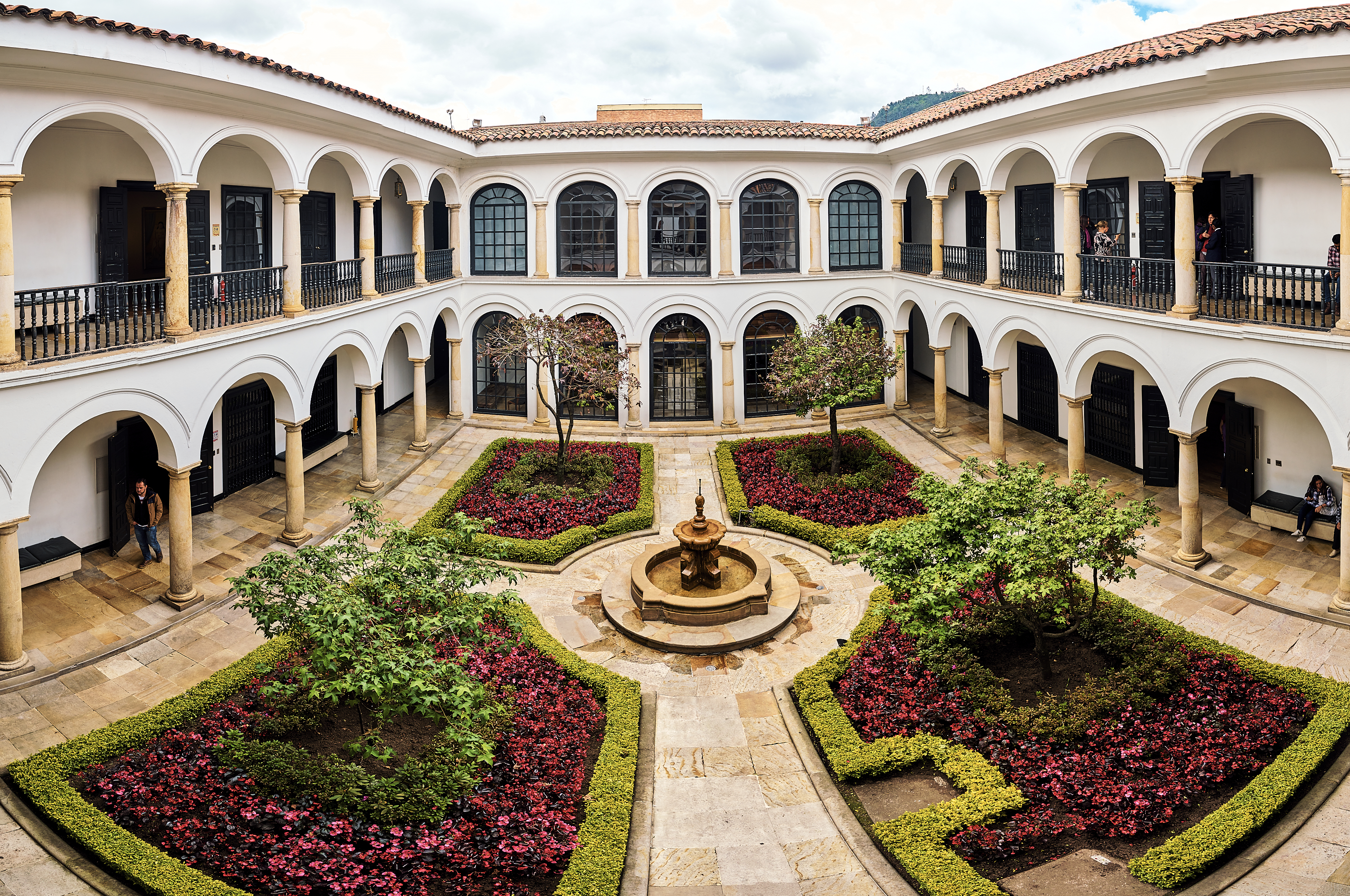
Museo Botero in Bogotá

- 1 November – The Museo Botero opens to the public in La Candelaria, Bogotá, available free of charge.
- 4–5 November – The 15th South American Youth Championships in Athletics are held in Estadio El Salitre in Bogotá.
- 12 November – Miss Colombia 2000 is held in Cartagena de Indias. Miss Cartagena, Andrea Nocetti, wins.

=== December ===
- 1 December – Authorities announce the discovery of a bomb along a road before a visit by United States politicians; later deemed unrelated to the following visit.
- 15 December – Hitmen under the instruction of an Army officer conspiring with the United Self-Defense Forces of Colombia (AUC) attacks Wilson Borja, the President of the National Federation of State Workers (Spanish: Federación Nacional de Trabajadores al Servicio del Estado), wounding him in the leg. A bystander dies in the crossfire between his bodyguards and the gunmen, as did a hitman.

=== Uncertain ===
- Fernando Botero donates 123 of his own art pieces and 85 by international artists to the Bank of the Republic, creating the Museo Botero.

== Births ==
- 10 September – Ela Taubert, singer and songwriter
- November – Loraine Lara, vallenato accordionist.

== Deaths ==
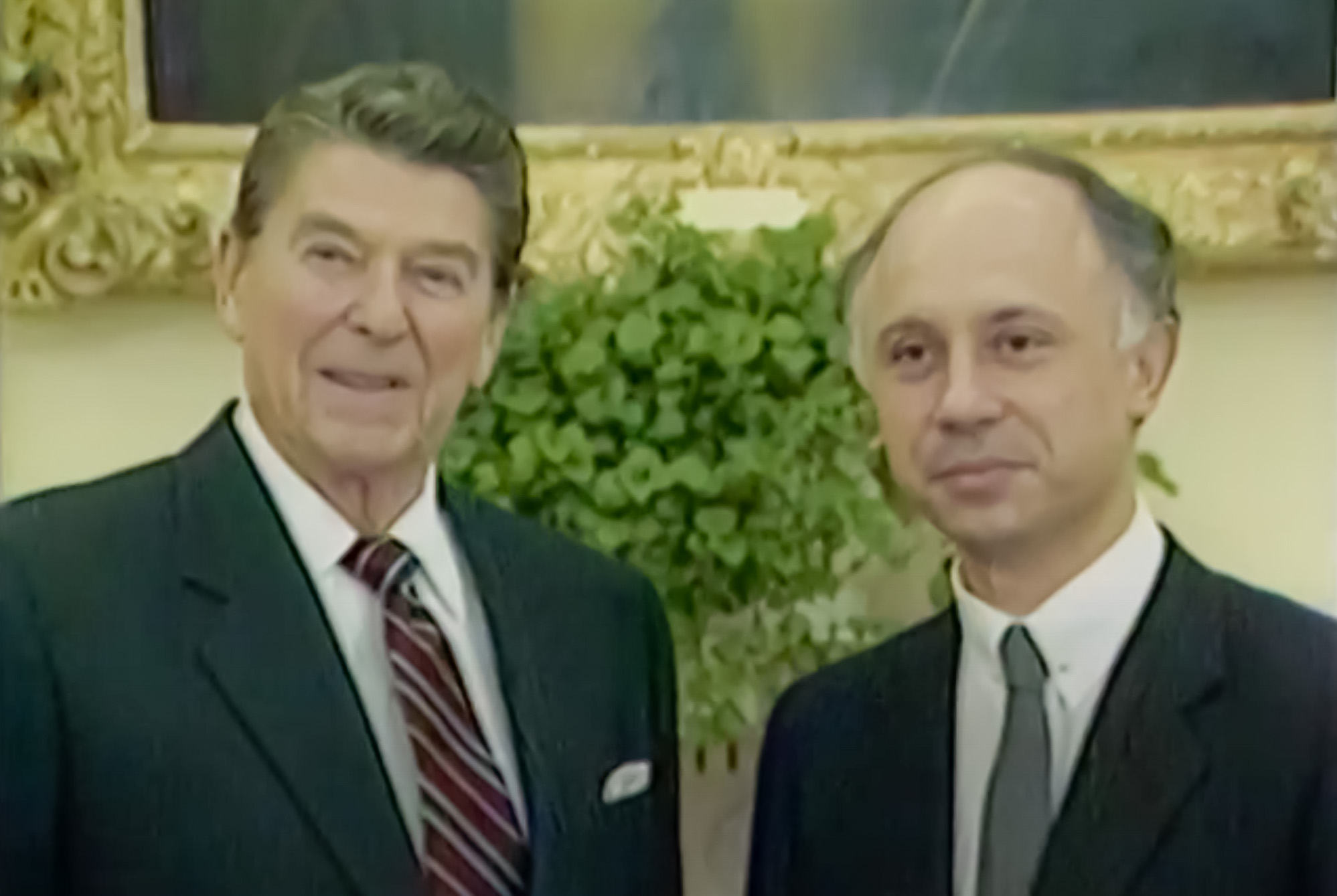
Rodrigo Lloreda (Right) with U.S President Ronald Reagan (Left) in 1985

- 2 January – Ramiro Better, singer-songwriter (b. 1963).
- 13 January – Rodrigo Lloreda Caicedo, politician and lawyer (b. 1942).
- 11 February – Graciela Arango de Tobón, songwriter (b. 1931).
- 1 March – Andrés Landero, composer and musician (b. 1932).
- 6 March – Germán Castelblanco, actor (b. 1957).
- 3 April – Hernán Castrillón Restrepo, news anchor (b. 1937).
- 28 April – Teresa Pizarro de Angulo, businesswoman (b. 1913).
- 8 May -- Mario Galán Gómez, politician and lawyer (b.1900s)
