= Terrorism in Colombia =

Terrorism in Colombia has occurred repeatedly during the last several decades, largely due to the ongoing armed conflict the country has been involved in since 1964. Perpetrators of terrorist acts in the country range from leftist guerrilla forces including FARC, ELN and M-19, to drug cartels such as the Medellín Cartel, to right-wing paramilitary forces including the AUC.

== Terror groups ==
Notable groups involved in terror attacks include:

- Revolutionary Armed Forces of Colombia (FARC)
- National Liberation Army (ELN)
- 19th of April Movement (M19)
- Medellin Cartel
- AUC

== Counterterrorism efforts ==
During the early 21st century, the number of known and suspected terrorists killed, captured, or surrendered fell as terror groups changed their tactics, while casualties rose. The Revolutionary Armed Forces of Colombia (FARC) reverted to hit-and-run attacks rather than engage in large unit encounters.

In November, 2011, security forces killed FARC leader Guillermo León Sáenz Vargas, also known as "Alfonso Cano."

=== Demobilization and reintegration efforts ===
Colombia has employed a multi-agency approach to countering radicalization and discouraging violent extremism. The government's program focuses on encouraging individual members units of the FARC and ELN to demobilize and reintegrate into society. Demobilization and reintegration programs provide medical care, psychological counseling, education benefits, and job placement assistance. Recidivism rates were estimated at between 10 and 20 percent by the Colombian Agency for Reintegration. Additionally, the Ministry of Defense has organized a number of public festivals and social events with celebrity participation to discourage the recruitment of vulnerable youth.

In 2013, a total of 1,350 FARC and ELN members had demobilized.

== Attacks ==
=== 2011 ===
- February 11, 2011 – Five civilians were killed in San Miguel, Putumayo in a mortar attack. The mortar was fired by suspected FARC terrorists and landed near a police post along with a baby.
- June 25, 2011 – Suspected ELN rebels attacked a police outpost in Colon Genova, Narino, using explosives and small-arms fire. Eight civilians were killed.
- September 18, 2011 – Several mortars were launched at an army base in La Macarena, Meta. The attack injured several civilians.
- October 30, 2011 – The armored convoy of Albeiro Vanegas, Vice President of the House of Representatives was attacked by suspected ELN terrorists. Vanegas was unharmed, but his driver was killed.

=== 2017 ===
- June 17, 2017: Centro Andino bombing – An explosion at the Centro Andino shopping mall killed 3 people. The attack was condemned as a terrorist attack and the authors remain unknown.

=== 2018 ===
- January 27, 2018: 2018 Colombia police stations attacks – Two hand grenades were thrown at the police stations of Barranquilla and Santa Rosa del Sur, killing seven officers and one perpetrator. The ELN was responsible for the attack.

=== 2019 ===
- January 17, 2019: 2019 Bogotá car bombing – The guerrilla rebel group ELN took the responsibility of the explosion of a car bomb inside the General Santander National Police Academy. The attack killed 21 people and injured several others.

== See also ==
- Crime in Colombia
- Narcoterrorism in Colombia
  - List of violent acts related to the internal conflict in Colombia (Wikipedia en Español)
- Right-wing terrorism in Colombia
