= 2002 in Colombia =

- Decades: 1980s; 1990s; 2000s; 2010s; 2020s
- See also: Other events of 2002; Timeline of Colombian history

Events from the year 2002 in Colombia.

== Incumbents ==
- President:
  - Andrés Pastrana Arango (1998 – 7 August 2002).
  - Álvaro Uribe Vélez (7 August 2002 – 2010).
- Vice President:
  - Gustavo Bell (1998–7 August 2002).
  - Francisco Santos Calderón (7 August 2002 – 2010).

== Events ==
=== Ongoing ===
- Colombian conflict

=== January ===
- 9 January – The Colombian government announces it is suspending peace talks with the Revolutionary Armed Forces of Colombia (FARC) and plans to enter the demilitarized zone.
- 30 January – Journalist Orlando Sierra Hernández is shot in the head twice while walking with his daughter in Manizales, Caldas. He dies in the hospital the following day.

=== February ===
- 20 February – Four FARC members hijack a commercial plane flying from Neiva to Bogotá. The president, as a result, decides to halt the peace process.
- 23 February – Presidential candidate Íngrid Betancourt and her campaign manager Clara Rojas are kidnapped by the FARC near San Vicente del Caguán.

=== March ===
- 10 March – 2002 parliamentary elections are held.
- 15 March – Football player Jairo Zulbarán is murdered while at a public market in Santa Marta.

=== April ===
- 11 April – Ancízar López López is kidnapped, allegedly by the National Liberation Army (ELN).
- 12 April – Valle del Cauca Deputies hostage crisis: 12 Deputies of the Valle del Cauca Department Assembly are kidnapped by FARC members with the goal of prisoner exchange.
- 26 April – Apartado massacre: FARC members kill nine workers and place explosives at the Villa Lucía banana plantation

=== May ===
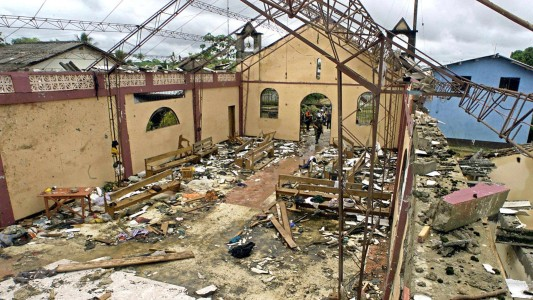
Bojayá Church after being hit (May 12, 2002).

2002 presidential election results by department Uribe| Serpa.

- 2 May – Bojayá massacre: An estimated 119 people are killed after a church is caught in the crossfire of fighting between the FARC and the United Self-Defense Forces of Colombia (AUC), struck with a cylinder bomb.
- 26 May – The 2002 Colombian presidential election is held; Álvaro Uribe of the Colombia First movement wins, earning 53% of the vote.

=== June ===
- 18 June – President-elect Álvaro Uribe meets with United States Secretary of Defense Donald Rumsfeld and Chairman of the Joint Chiefs of Staff General Richard Myers in Washington, D.C.

=== July ===
- 15 July – Amnesty International issues a 'fear for safety' public statement on SINTRAELECOL Human Rights officer Rodrigo Acevedo and other union members. This came after multiple apparent attempts on his life and the murders of at least 160 trade unionist murders in 2001.

=== August ===
- 7 August – Álvaro Uribe and Francisco Santos Calderón are inaugurated as the 31st president and 8th vice president of Colombia.
- 7 August – 14 people are killed in a FARC missile attack on the Casa de Nariño during Uribe's inauguration.

=== September ===
- 23–26 September – President Uribe meets with U.S. President George W. Bush.
- 24 September – The U.S. Department of Justice unseals indictments against AUC members, including Carlos Castaño-Gil, for cocaine trafficking.

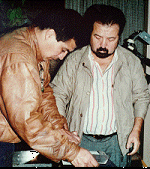
Gilberto Rodriguez Orejuela being captured.

=== November ===
- 7 November – Gilberto Rodríguez Orejuela, a drug lord from the Cali Cartel is granted early release after serving 7 years in prison on the basis of good behavior, despite efforts by the U.S. government to stop his release.

=== October ===
- 16–18 October – Operation Orion: the 4th Brigade of the Colombian military, the Administrative Department of Security (DAS), and police special forces conduct a military offensive within Comuna 13, Medellín with the stated mission of fighting FARC, ELN, and People’s Armed Commandos (CAP) members.

=== December ===
- 11 December – Police discover a number of cars rigged with remote control steering and explosives, believed to be prepared for attacks in Bogotá. They manage to defuse five cars bombs.
- 24 December – At a check-point in Paime, Cundinamarca, councilman José Alirio Macías is killed by the FARC-EP.

== Deaths ==
- 9 January – Maruja Hinestrosa, pianist and composer
- 1 February – Orlando Sierra Hernández, columnist and journalist (b. 1959).
- 15 March – Jairo Zulbarán, football player (b. 1970).
- 16 March – Isaías Duarte Cancino, Roman Catholic archbishop (b. 1939).
