= Belkis Florentina Izquierdo Torres =

Colombian judge

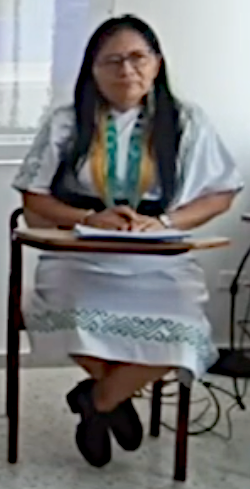
- Torres in 2024
- Born: Valledupar, Colombia
- Education: National University of Colombia; Superior School of Public Administration
- Occupation: Judge

Belkis Florentina Izquierdo Torres (also known as Aty Seikuinduwa) is a Colombian judge. In 2014, she became the first indigenous woman to serve as an auxiliary magistrate of the Superior Council of the Judicature of Colombia.

== Biography ==
Izquierdo Torres was born in Valledupar, Cesar Department, Colombia. She is a member of the Arhuaco people, of which she serves as a leader.

Izquierdo Torres studied law at the National University of Colombia before obtaining a master's degree in public administration from the Superior School of Public Administration. In addition, she also holds a diploma in food security.

Between 2003 and 2008, Izquierdo Torres worked as a legal advisor for Dusakawi Empresa Promotora de Salud Indígena, an organisation promoting access to healthcare for indigenous communities in Colombia; in 2009, she worked with the Asociación de productores Agroecológicos Indígenas y Campesinos de la Sierra Nevada de Santa Marta, promoting the rights of indigenous farmers. She later worked as a legal advisor for the Colombian government, including the Ministry of the Interior (2011–2012) and the Presidency (2013–2014).

In 2012, Izquierdo Torres worked as a consultant for the United Nations Development Programme.

In 2014, Izquierdo Torres became the first indigenous woman to become an auxiliary judge of the Superior Council of the Judicature. She stated her intention to focus on promoting indigenous autonomy within the justice system as being seen as a fundamental human right; strengthening co-ordination between Colombian and indigenous law systems; and defending the rights of women and children.

In 2017, Izquierdo Torres was among 51 judges selected to serve the Special Jurisdiction for Peace (JEP), a transitional justice mechanism through which members of Revolutionary Armed Forces of Colombia (FARC) and other individuals that participated in the Colombian conflict could be investigated and tried. She served as the JEP's vice president between 2022 and 2024, and as of 2025, serves as President of its Truth Recognition Chamber.

Izquierdo Torres recognised territory as being a victim of the conflict within the JEP's framework, citing damage caused by oil spills, anti-personnel mines, glyphosate spraying, and illegal mining, largely on indigenous lands. Case 02 of the JEP formally recognised Katsa-Su and Eperara Euja territories as victims of the conflict. Case 09, which included primarily indigenous, Afro-Colombian and Romani victims, led to Izquierdo Torres calling publicly for "inter-justice dialogue" between the Colombian judiciary and marginalised groups.

In 2024, lawyers for several FARC leaders filed for a recusal of Izquierdo Torres, stating she lacked impartiality. The evidence cited against her included comments made in 2021 where she called for an end to the "continued denial" from FARC of committing crimes during the conflict; and her indigenous background, which they stated meant she was biased against the defendants in a trial considering whether FARC had committed crimes against humanity following the massacre of 27 Awa-Kwaiker people in Nariño. The recusal attempt was criticised as a "defence strategy" and not upheld by JEP.

In 2025, Izquierdo Torres was named as Jurist of the Year by the Centre for International Human Rights at Northwestern University's Pritzker School of Law in recognition of her "visionary jurisprudence recognising the rights of Indigenous communities and the environment".

A documentary about Izquierdo Torres' life, Aty Seikuinduwa: A Judge Between Worlds, focuses on her spiritual and legal journey.
