= 1998 in Colombia =

- Decades: 1970s; 1980s; 1990s; 2000s; 2010s
- See also: Other events of 1998; Timeline of Colombian history

Events of 1998 in Colombia.

== Incumbents ==
- President:
  - Ernesto Samper (1994–7 August 1998).
  - Andrés Pastrana Arango (7 August 1998 – 2002).
- Vice President:
  - Carlos Lemos Simmonds (1997–7 August 1998).
  - Gustavo Bell (7 August 1998 – 2002).

== Events ==
=== January ===
- 11–12 January – Hundreds of non-inmates, mostly visitors, are inside San Isidro prison in Popayan, Cauca during a prison protest over living conditions, including overcrowding. Many are relatives and loved ones of inmates voluntarily staying as a part of the protest, but others have been taken hostage. On the 11th, 18 of those taken hostage are released.

=== February ===
- 4 February – Amnesty International announces the closure of its Bogotá office after recent threats.
- 25 February – Víctor Carranza, known as the “emerald czar” is arrested.
- 27 February – The director of the Permanent Committee for the Defense of Human Rights of Antioquia (Spanish: Comité Permanente por la Defensa de los Derechos Humanos de Antioquia) Jesús María Valle Jaramillo is shot and killed in his office in Medellín.

=== March ===
- 8 March – The 1998 parliamentary election are held. The Liberal Party wins a majority in the Chamber, 84 of the 161 seats, and a plurality in the Senate, 48 of the 102 seats.

=== April ===
- 28 April – Men claiming to be members of the Peasant Self-Defense Group of Córdoba and Urabá (ACCU) kidnap 6 previously displaced men in Bello, Antioquia, killing at least 4 (the other 2 being 'disappeared').

=== May ===
1998 presidential election second round results by Department Won by Horacio Serpa Won by Andres Pastrana

- 16 May – Barrancabermeja massacre.
- 19 May – The Twentieth Brigade of the Colombian army is suspended, pending reorganization. This was after the government publicly connected them to the 1995 murder of Álvaro Gómez Hurtado.
- 31 May – The 1998 presidential election is held; Horacio Serpa of the Liberal Party wins the plurality (34.78%) over the Great Alliance for Change's Andrés Pastrana Arango, but, since no one candidate earns a majority, it goes to a second round.

=== June ===
- 21 June – The second round of the 1998 presidential election is held; Andrés Pastrana Arango of the Great Alliance for Change wins with a 50.34% majority over the Liberal Party's Horacio Serpa.
- 26 June – The Colombia national football team plays England during the group stage (G) of the 1998 FIFA World Cup in Lens, France. England beats Colombia 2 to 0, which knocks Colombia out of the running.

=== July ===
- 10 July – Caracol Televisión and RCN Televisión are both launched as television networks.

=== August ===
- 7 August – Andrés Pastrana Arango is inaugurated as the 30th president of Colombia.

=== September ===
- 15 September – Liberal Party congressman Jorge Humberto González Noreña is assassinated.

=== October ===
- 18 October – Machuca Massacre.

=== November ===
- 3–5 November – Siege of Mitú.

=== December ===
- December – Air Force pilots drop cluster bombs on Santo Domingo, Norte de Santander, killing 17, including 5 children, and wounding 30.
- 8 December – Villanueva Massacre.
- 13 December – Santo Domingo massacre.

== Births ==
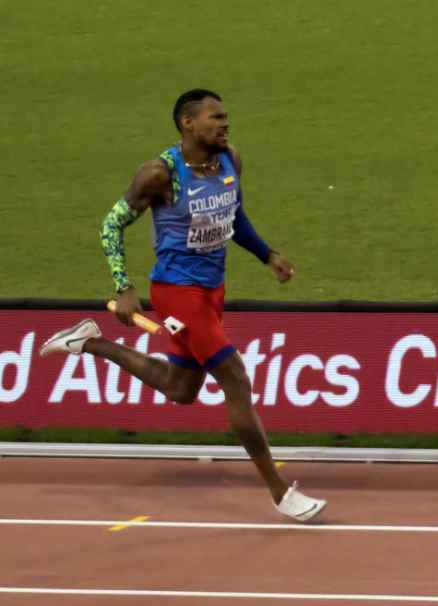
Anthony Zambrano in 2019

- January 17 – Anthony Zambrano, sprinter.

== Deaths ==
- 14 February – Manuel Pérez, National Liberation Army (ELN) leader (b. 1943).
- 27 February – Jesús María Valle Jaramillo, human rights advocate.
- 15 September – Jorge Humberto González Noreña, politician and then congressmen.
- 28 September – Julio de la Ossa, vallenato accordionist (b. 1936)
