= 1997 in Colombia =

- Decades: 1970s; 1980s; 1990s; 2000s; 2010s
- See also: Other events of 1997; Timeline of Colombian history

Events of 1997 in Colombia.

== Incumbents ==
- President: Ernesto Samper Pizano (1994–1998).
- Vice President: Carlos Lemos Simmonds (1996–1998).

== Events ==
=== January ===
- 20 January – Emberá leader Joaquín Domicó, Emberá is killed.

=== February ===
- 11 February – 800,000 workers, many in the public sector, participate in a walk out over President Ernesto Samper's economic policies of austerity and privatization.

=== March ===
- 16 March – Three car bombs, two in Cúcuta, Norte de Santander and one in Saravena, Arauca, are detonated by the National Liberation Army (ELN). The bomb in Cúcuta kills an 18-month-old and injures four others. The bomb in Saravena kills four and wounds five others.

=== April ===
- 21 April – The 47th Vuelta a Colombia begins in Bucaramanga, Santander.

=== May ===
- 14 May – Doris Adriana Niño dies after meeting with vallenato singer Diomedes Díaz. Her body is found on the side of the rode in Boyacá and it is determined she died of a cocaine overdose. Díaz later went on trial and was, controversially, deemed innocent of her death.
- 20 May – The 27th President of Colombia Virgilio Barco Vargas dies in Bogotá, after suffering from Cancer and Alzheimer's.

=== June ===
- June 14 – 60 soldiers kidnapped by the Southern Bloc of the Revolutionary Armed Forces of Colombia People's Army (FARC-EP) in the 1996 attack on Las Delicias military nine months earlier are released through the Colombian Red Cross and the Catholic Church Cartagena del Chairá, Caquetá.

=== July ===
- 15–20 July – Mapiripán massacre: Around 30 to 49 people are killed with chainsaws and machetes by the United Self-Defense Forces of Colombia (AUC) in collaboration with units of the Colombian National Army.

=== August ===
- 7 August – The Ministry of Culture is established.
- 21 August – The 23rd President of Colombia Misael Pastrana dies at the age of 73 in Bogotá. He served as president from 1970 to 1974.

=== September ===
- 10 September – The Colombia national football team defeats Venezuela's 1–0 at the Estadio Metropolitano Roberto Meléndez in Barranquilla. This solidifies their qualification for the 1998 FIFA World Cup.

=== October ===
- 22 October – El Aro Massacre.
- 26 October –
  - 1997 Colombian referendum.
  - 1997 regional and municipal elections.

=== November ===
- 5 November – Carlos Arturo Marulanda, Colombia's ambassador to the United Nations, resigns after questions arise around his relationship to right-wing paramilitaries.
- 11-12 November – San José del Guaviare massacre: Members of the Centauros Bloc of the AUC murder 11 people in San José del Guaviare.

=== December ===
- 30 December – The Antonio Escobar Camargo bridge between Zambrano, Bolívar and Plato, Magdalena, the longest viaduct in the country, opens.

=== Uncertain ===
- The Mosque of Omar Ibn Al-Khattab, the third-largest mosque in Latin America, completes construction in Maicao, La Guajira.

== Births ==
- 13 January – Luis Díaz, footballer.
- 28 January – Alvaro Meléndez, footballer.
- 2 December – Luis Suárez, footballer.

== Deaths ==
- 20 January – Joaquín Domicó, Emberá leader.
- 20 March– Gerardo Bedoya, journalist.
- 17 April – Hena Rodríguez, painter, educator, and first female Colombian sculptor (b. 1915).
- 21 August – Misael Pastrana, lawyer and former Colombian president (b. 1923).
