= Juan Patiño =

Juan Patiño may refer to:

- Juan Carlos Patino-Arango, American Roman Catholic seminarian accused of child molestation
- Juan Patiño (footballer, born 1989), Paraguayan football centre-back
- Juan Patiño (footballer, born 2001), Colombian football winger
