= 2001 in Colombia =

- Decades: 1980s; 1990s; 2000s; 2010s; 2020s
- See also: Other events of 2001; Timeline of Colombian history

Events of 2001 in Colombia.

== Incumbents ==
- President: Andrés Pastrana Arango (1998–2002).
- Vice President: Gustavo Bell (1998–2002).

== Events ==
=== January ===
- 1 January – Politicians elected in the October 29th 2000 regional and municipal elections take office.
- 4 January – The Colombian Government asks the Revolutionary Armed Forces of Colombia (FARC) to clarify whether they were responsible for the 29 December 2000 assassination of Congressperson Diego Turbay and his family in Caquetá.
- 17 January – Chengue Massacre.

=== February ===
- 8-9 February – The FARC return to peace talks after meetings between Manuel "Sureshot" Marulanda and President Andrés Pastrana Arango.
- 24-27 February – President Pastrana meets with U.S. President George W. Bush in New York at the United Nations General Assembly.

=== March ===
- 23 March – President Andrés Pastrana meets with Venezuelan president Hugo Chavez.

=== April ===
- 10-13 April – Naya Massacre: Members of the Calima Front of the United Self-Defense Forces of Colombia (AUC) kill around 50 mostly displaced Indigenous and Afro-Colombian people in Alto Naya, Cauca.

=== May ===
- 17 May – A car bomb goes off in Parque Lleras in Medellín, killing at least seven people and injuring at least 50.

=== June ===
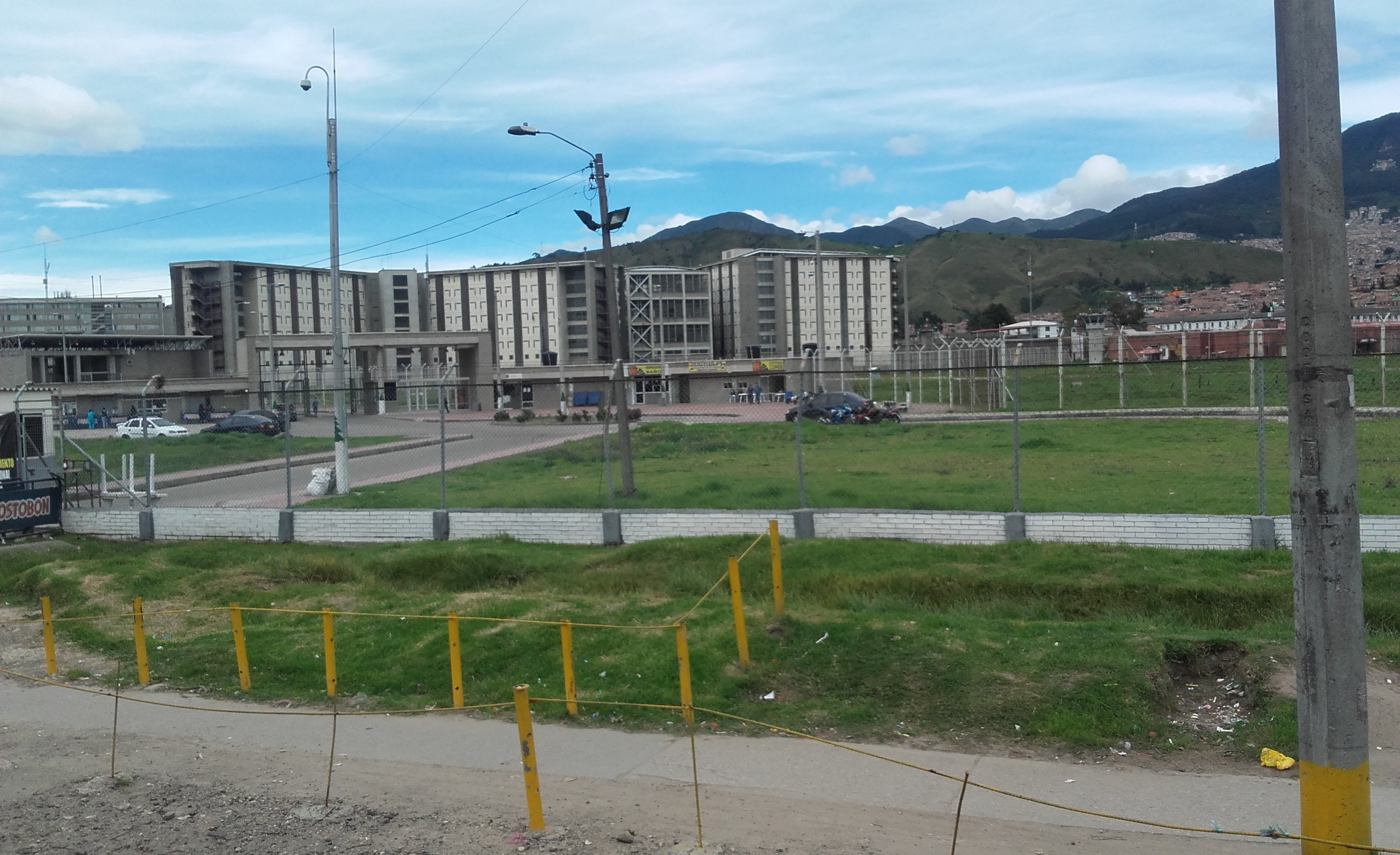
La Picota Prison

- Uncertain date – The programadora En Vivo (previously Nuevos Días TV) ceases operations.
- 17 June – The 51st Vuelta a Colombia begins Ciudad de Popayán, Cauca.
- 23 June – The FARC-EP attack and break into La Picota prison in Bogotá with dynamite and the goal of breaking out FARC prisoners after the government refused to participate in a prisoners exchange. More than 140 prisoners fled, five were killed, and at least 36 were recaptured.

=== July ===
- 11–29 July – The 2001 Copa América is held in Colombia. At the finals in Bogotá on the 29th, Colombia wins 1–0 against México and Honduras wins third place against Uruguay after a penalty round.
- 24 July – Bigamy ceases to be a criminal offense in Colombia.

=== August ===
- 7 August – President Pastrana announces that he will be cutting off talks with the ELN in a speech to army personnel.

=== September ===
- 10 September – The United Self Defense Forces of Colombia is put on the United States Department of State list of Foreign Terrorist Organizations (FTO).
- 24 September – Consuelo Araújo and 20 others are kidnapped by the 59th front of the FARC-EP in Patillal, Valledupar, Cesar.
- 30 September – Consuelo Araújo is killed during combat between the FARC-EP kidnappers and the National Army in La Mina, Valledupar, Cesar.

=== October ===
- 6 October – The Colombia national rugby union team plays Venezuela's in the first match of the 2001 South American Rugby Championship "B" in Caracas. Venezuela wins 55–0.

=== November ===
- 3 November – The Colombia national rugby union team plays Brazil's in their second match of the 2001 South American Rugby Championship "B" in Bogota. Brazil wins 44–12.
- 12 November – 2001 Miss Colombia is held in Cartagena de Indias, Miss Chocó, Vanessa Mendoza, wins.

=== December ===
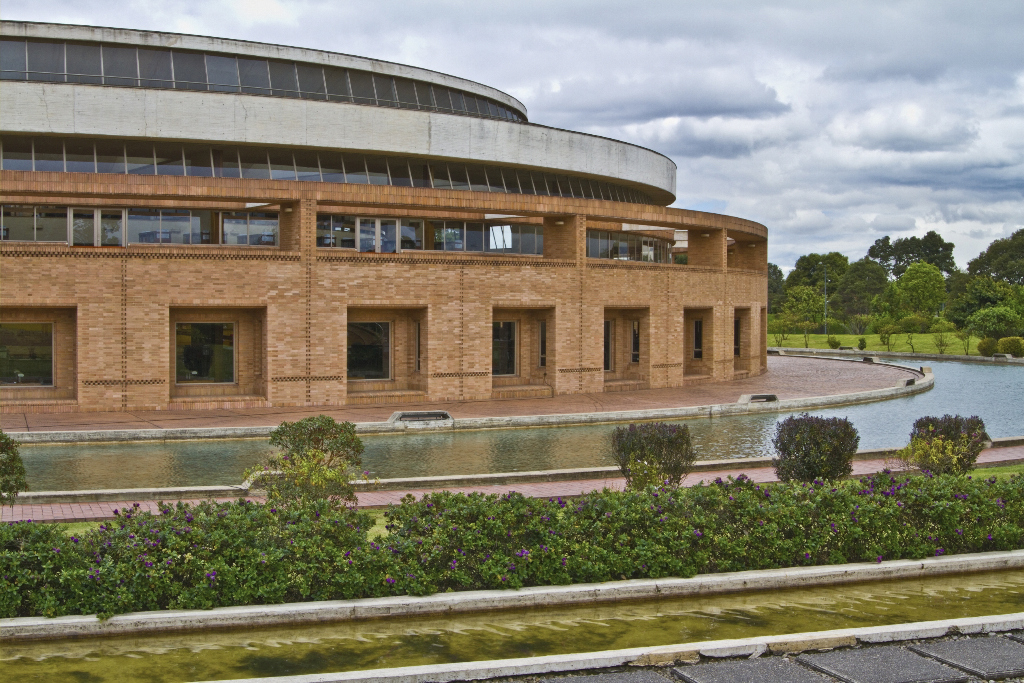
The Virgilio Barco Public Library in Bogotá

- 21 December – The Virgilio Barco Public Library in Bogotá opens.
- 24 December – The Colombian government and FARC agree to hold peace talks in January 2002.

== Births ==
- 8 January – Juan Cabal, footballer.
- 25 January – Cristian Devenish, footballer.
- 1 February – Juan Patiño, footballer.
- 17 April – Yeison López Cuello, weightlifter.
- 30 July – Daniel Ruiz, footballer.
- 3 September – María Barrera Zapata, Paralympic swimmer.

== Deaths ==
- 1 January – Heriberto Urán, racing cyclist (b. 1954).
- 11 January – Álvaro Jordan, tennis play (b. 1962).
- 30 September – Consuelo Araújo, politician, writer, and journalist (b. 1940).
