= La Mejor Esquina massacre =

1988 massacre in Colombia

- Part of Colombian conflict
- Native name: Masacre de La Mejor Esquina
- Location: La Mejor Esquina, Buenavista, Córdoba, Colombia
- Date: April 3, 1988; 38 years ago
- Deaths: 27
- Injuries: 17
- Assailant: Los Magníficos

La Mejor Esquina massacre was the 3 April 1988 mass killing of 27 people in La Mejor Esquina, Buenavista, Córdoba, Colombia by Los Magníficos (lit. 'The Magnificent Ones'), a right-wing paramilitary commanded by Fidel Castaño. Approximately 20 paramilitary members opened fire at a fandango festival commemorating Easter Sunday, where some 200 people were celebrating, at around 9:30 PM. After 10 minutes of shooting, 27 people died, including a woman and a child, and at least 17 were injured.

== See also ==
- List of massacres in Colombia
- Fidel Castaño
