= 2026 Bogotá stabbing =

List of massacres in Colombia

- Location: Bogotá, Colombia
- Date: March 24, 2026; 12:00 a.m
- Attack type: Femicide, mass murder, stabbing, Mass stabbing
- Weapons: Egress Knife, Injection (suicide attempt)
- Deaths: 3
- Injuries: 1 (the perpetrator)
- Perpetrator: Cristian Camilo Valencia Hurtado
- Motive: Violence against women

On March 24, 2026, in a neighborhood in Bosa, Bogotá, Colombia, an incident occurred that affected three people, who turned out to be three women, in what became a triple fatality in Colombia, and their aggressor was captured.

== Incident ==
=== Background ===
Cristian Camilo Valencia Hurtado, who was the victims' partner, had a history of domestic violence, sexual abuse, and murder threats. While the sexual abuse and mistreatment were not reported, he attempted suicide with poison after the three murders occurred but failed. Upon his capture, he was sentenced to 48 years and 10 months in prison.

=== Stabbing ===
In the early hours of the 21, the assailant entered the building with a weapon, killing two victims. During the attack, the assailant fled to go after his other victim. He then went to his other victim, brutally stabbing her before escaping and waiting until March 24, when the news broke and the aggressor was officially captured. He had attempted to take his own life with poison.

== Victims ==
- Daisy Ana Granados Arboleda, 42
- Karen Juliana Penagos Granados, 20
- Chantal Daniela Penagos Granados, 17

== See also ==
- Pozzetto massacre
- Reminiscencias dance club shooting
- 2007 Balsillas massacre
