= Jamundí massacre =

Colombian massacre

Jamundí Massacre
- Jamundí massacre (Colombia)
- Location: Jamundí, Valle del Cauca; Colombia
- Date: 21–22 May 2005 (UTC -5)
- Target: Colombian National Police
- Attack type: shooting, mass murder, massacre
- Weapon: small arms
- Deaths: 11
- Perpetrator: Colombian Army

The Jamundí Massacre (Spanish: Masacre de Jamundí) was a massacre perpetrated by a Colombian National Army elite unit known as the High Mountain Battalion ("Batallón de Alta Montaña") which was then commanded by Colonel Byron Carvajal against an elite Colombian National Police counter-narcotics unit on May 22, 2006 in the municipality of Jamundí, Department of Valle del Cauca.

== Indictments ==
On February 18, 2008 a civil judge in Cali condemned 15 soldiers for the massacre of ten policemen and a civilian.

Initially the spokesman from the Army battalion referred to it as a friendly fire incident, confusing the anti-narcotics unit with an insurgent group. The case however, was investigated and resulted in the indictment of the soldiers for being at the service of drug cartels. Colombian authorities suspected Diego León Montoya Sánchez a.k.a. "Don Diego" as the mastermind behind the attack.

== See also ==
- List of massacres in Colombia
