= Segovia massacre =

1988 massacre in Colombia

- Part of Colombian conflict
- Location: Segovia, Antioquia, Colombia
- Date: November 11, 1988; 37 years ago
- Deaths: 46

The Segovia massacre was the 11 November 1988 killing of 46 people in Segovia, Antioquia, Colombia by the Muerte a Revolucionarios del Nordeste Antioqueño (MRN; lit. 'Death to the Revolutionaries of Northeast Antioquia'), a right wing paramilitary led by Fidel Castaño. The perpetrators threw grenades inside local businesses and shot indiscriminately at civilians. 60 people were also injured.

== Background ==
In the days leading up to the massacre, residents of Segovia and the town of La Cruzada received threatening pamphlets at their homes.

== See also ==
- List of massacres in Colombia
