= 1999 in Colombia =

- Decades: 1970s; 1980s; 1990s; 2000s; 2010s
- See also: Other events of 1999; Timeline of Colombian history

The following events occurred during 1999 in Colombia.

== Incumbents ==
- President: Andrés Pastrana Arango (1998 – 2002).
- Vice President: Gustavo Adolfo Bell Lemus (1998 – 2002).

== Events ==
=== January ===
- 7 January – The 1999–2002 FARC–Government peace process begins.
- 25 January – The 6.2 M_{w} Armenia, Colombia earthquake kills at least 1,900.

=== February ===
- 25 February – Ingrid Washinawatok and two colleagues are kidnapped in Arauca by Revolutionary Armed Forces of Colombia (FARC) guerillas.

=== April ===
- 12 April – Representative Juan Manuel Corzo and 39 other passengers on a plane heading from Bucaramanga to Cúcuta are kidnapped by National Liberation Army (ELN) guerillas.

=== June ===
- 13-27 – 49th Vuelta a Colombia

=== July ===
- 28 July – Armed men murder 4 people in San José del Guaviare.

=== August ===
- 21 August – La Gabarra massacre

=== September ===
- 25 September – Jorge Velosa is kidnapped by Popular Liberation Army (EPL) guerillas.

=== November ===
- November 12 – At the beauty pageant for Miss Colombia 1999, presenter Carolina Cruz wins the title of national vice-queen, and 22-year-old Shakira performs her song, "Moscas en la Casa".

== Births ==
- 9 March – Carlos Cuesta, football defender
- 22 April – Cucho Hernández, football forward
- 17 June – Luis Sinisterra, football left winger
- 27 September – Anderson Arroyo, football defender
- 26 October – Luis Patiño, baseball pitcher
- 19 December – Ilenia Antonini, actor and musician

== Deaths ==
- 10 February – Nirma Zárate, artist and professor (b. 1936).
- 25 February (c.) – Ingrid Washinawatok, Native American activist (b. 1957).
- 3 May – Hernán Henao Delgado, anthropologist (b. 1945).
- 5 September – Hernando Marín, vallenato songwriter (b.1944)
- 29 December – Guillermo Valencia Salgado, writer and poet (b. 1927).
