= Macayepo massacre =

- Location: Macayepo, Bolívar; Colombia
- Date: 14 October 2000; 18:55 (UTC -5)
- Target: Civilians dubbed as guerrilla supporters
- Attack type: shooting, mass murder, massacre
- Weapon: small arms
- Deaths: 15
- Perpetrator: AUC: Heroes of Montes de Maria Bloc

The Macayepo massacre (Spanish: Masacre de Macayepo) occurred on October 14, 2000, resulting in the slaughter of fifteen peasants from Macayepo in the southern region of Bolívar Department, northern Colombia. It was one of a series of massacres perpetrated by the Colombian paramilitary bloc Héroes de los Montes de María, a unit of the United Self-Defense Forces of Colombia (AUC), to obtain control over the area around the Montes de María mountains. The massacre also involved congressman Álvaro García Romero who was subsequently accused as a possible mastermind of the massacre.

The area represents a centralized strategic path to travel easily to any department of the Caribbean Region. The area had been disputed since 1998 by nearly 80 paramilitaries commanded by Rodrigo Antonio Mercado (aka "Pelufo" or "Cadena") with nearly 300 guerrilla fighters from the 35th and 37th fronts of the Caribbean Bloc of the FARC-EP guerrilla, led by alias Martin Caballero.

Between February 2000 and January 2001 the AUC was responsible for at least five major massacres in the area including the Macayepo Massacre, El Salado Massacre on February 18, 2000, and the Chengue Massacre on January 17, 2001, resulting in more than 100 deaths and 4,000 forcedly displaced people.

== The Massacre ==
The group of 80 paramilitaries entered the area of the Montes de María from the corregimiento of El Aguacate and into the corregimiento of Macayepo where they held 15 peasants and beat them to death with sticks, machetes and stones.

== Telephone recording ==
Investigations regarding the massacre were carried out by the Human Rights Unit of the Attorney General Office of Colombia.

A cassette recording surfaced containing a telephone conversation registered on October 6, 2000, at 18:55 p.m. between senator Álvaro García Romero and a landowner of the area named Joaquín García. It reveals them code talking a priori in reference to the Macayepo events.

Alvaro Garcia (AG): I consider that that decision is not easy to make today, but that it will be easy to make in ten days...
Joaquin Garcia (JG): Well, the truth is that what matters is that the troops are not taken there, stay for two days, and then leave...
AG: That proposal can be done by the governor, listen...
JG: Hope you can help me with that, pal, because...
AG: Take that for granted. And did you talk to the colonel?
JG: The situation over there is grave... I talked to these friends of mine and they are telling me that... They are always using the excuse of the green guys... I do not know that green guy: is there a way to touch him so he can go away...?
AG: That guy will be out in a month...
JG: I'm not saying give a name to see who is place there... Not to help... Look, we don't need a guy helping us but that don't fuck with us, I mean, that ignores everything to see if these guys can work, because they're saying that they are going to Macayepo tomorrow...
AG: You know that I've told them...
JG: Yes. The thing is, and you know it, too, that these guys we have to be looking out on how to control them and that they go all the way up over there, brother...
AG: That's what I'm telling you. Valdías' son told me that his dad was delivered today 35. He has it in his house and had 40 more and tomorrow I'm going to weigh some cattle...
JG: Did you talk to Aníbal?
AG: With his son, the son has been talking to me...
JG: Yes, Aníbal...
AG: Aníbal yes...
JG: And Aníbal already told his father...
AG: He already talked to his father and just talked to me. His father was waiting a call from you yesterday, Aníbal just told me.
JG: Got it, eh, but you didn't tell me anything...
AG: Aníbal told me about it, but I was in a hurry. I also thought that was already organized... get it?
JG: Yes.
AG: Then, I had that thing for granted...
JG: Well, Álvaro, no problem - I'll do that...

— Centre or Independent Media, Paramilitares y Clase política en Sucre

== See also ==
- 2006–2007 Colombian parapolitics scandal
- List of massacres in Colombia
