= Villanueva Massacre =

Villanueva massacre
- Location: Villanueva, La Guajira; Colombia
- Date: 8 December 1998
- Target: Presumed supporters of the Luciano Ariza Front of the National Liberation Army (ELN)
- Attack type: shooting, mass murder, massacre
- Weapon: small arms
- Deaths: 11
- Perpetrator: AUC

The Villanueva massacre was a massacre in the Colombian town of Villanueva, Department of La Guajira. The massacre occurred on December 8, 1998 in the neighborhood known as El Cafetal and some 11 people were assassinated by members of the United Self-Defense Forces of Colombia (AUC) by orders of Carlos Castaño. Alias "Jorge 40", commander of the Northern Bloc of the AUC, part of the paramilitary structure later admitted to participating in the massacre by order of Castaño, in which the operation was commanded by alias "Daniel" and a unit of some 80 paramilitaries.

According to inhabitants of Villanueva, the victims were dragged out of their homes while a paramilitary commander called out their names on a list. Alias "Jorge 40" confessed that the massacre had taken place because there had been reports that the neighborhood was an enclave of the Luciano Ariza Front of the National Liberation Army (ELN) guerrilla. He also confessed the motives of selecting December 8 as the date of the massacre, a traditional local Roman Catholic celebration known as the "Dia de las Velitas", and in which people use fireworks to celebrate. Fireworks would conceal the sound of the shots.

== See also ==
- List of massacres in Colombia
