= Nariño massacres =

2009 Awá massacres in Nariño, Colombia

- Nariño shown in red
- Location: Nariño Department, Colombia
- Date: 4 and 11 February 2009
- Attack type: Massacre
- Deaths: 27
- Perpetrator: FARC
- Defender: Indigenous Awá people

The Nariño massacres (Spanish: Masacres en Nariño) were two massacres of Indigenous Awá people in the Nariño Department of Colombia perpetrated by members of the rebel Revolutionary Armed Forces of Colombia (FARC) in February 2009. A total of 27 Awás were massacred, including women and young children.

== First massacre ==
The first massacre occurred on 4 February 2009, when a FARC guerrilla group entered the village Tortugal. FARC accused the Awás of collaborating with the Armed Forces of Colombia. These accusations led to the torture and killing of seventeen Awás, eight of whom were killed with knives, according to a witness who managed to escape. The incident was denounced by Human Rights Watch and the Governor of the Nariño Department, Antonio Navarro Wolff.

== Second massacre ==
The second massacre occurred a week later on 11 February, when ten Awá were murdered in the Sandé shelter between Ricaurte and Guachavez, apparently because they failed to provide FARC with information about the Colombian forces operating in the area. In press releases, FARC stated that they support the Indigenous, but not those who conspire against them. The National Army of Colombia only found one of the bodies. Although the Awá live in a protected area, this did not prevent armed groups from entering their territory.

== See also ==
- Colombian conflict
- List of massacres in Colombia
- Violence against Indigenous peoples in Colombia
