= Villatina massacre =

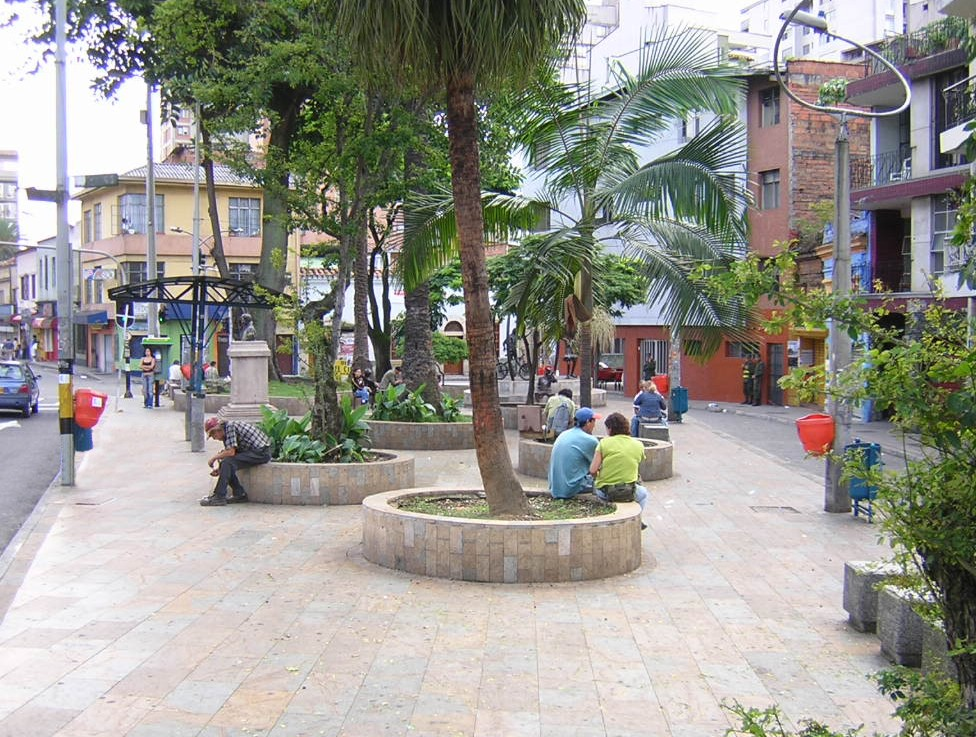
- The Park of the Journalist in downtown Medellín has a monument to the victims of the Villatina massacre.
- Location: Medellín, Antioquia; Colombia
- Date: 15 November 1992
- Target: Civilians
- Attack type: shooting, mass murder, massacre
- Weapon: small arms
- Deaths: 9
- Perpetrator: Colombian National Police

The Villatina massacre was a massacre of eight children and one young adult by the Colombian police that took place on 15 November 1992 in the city of Medellín. Colombian policemen had been killed by youth gangs before the massacre took place, and the Colombian police were attempting to exact revenge against the gangs by carrying out the massacre. None of the victims of the massacre were gang members; they were all members of a Protestant Christian organization.

== Background ==
In the ongoing civil war in Colombia, many young people have been involved in street gangs and various militias. As a result, young people in Colombia claim to have been targeted by police regardless of whether they are actually involved in illicit activity. Human rights activists suggest that this targeting is retaliation for the killing of police officers. According to these activists, the Colombian drug cartels will offer a bounty for the murder of a police officer, and because young people living in poverty are assumed to be criminals, they are often targeted by police in retaliation for the actions of the cartels.

== Massacre ==
On November 15, 1992, around 9:00 PM, eight children and one adult, all members of a Christian youth group, were standing on a street corner in east Medellín. Three cars pulled up to the corner, and twelve men exited carrying weapons typical of the police. Seeing this, the young people began to pull out their identification cards, but the men ordered them to lie down on the ground. Once they were lying, the men opened fire on them. At one point the men debated sparing the life of eight-year-old Johana Mazo Ramírez, whose leg was in a cast, but one of their number killed her after arguing, "How can we leave them alive if they're the ones killing us." Eight of the nine people attacked were killed, and the gunmen fled the scene after a patrol from the Colombian Army arrived. One victim was wounded and survived for a time before he succumbed too. The names and ages of the victims were Johana Mazo Ramírez (8), Johny Alexander Cardona Ramírez (17), Ricardo Alexander Hernández (17), Giovanny Alberto Vallejo Restrepo (15), Oscar Andrés Ortiz Toro (17), Ángel Alberto Barón Miranda (16), Marlon Alberto Álvarez (17), Nelson Duban Flórez Villa (17), and Mauricio Antonio Higuita Ramírez (22).

== Legacy ==
Before dying, the one victim who had been wounded and transferred to the hospital told his mother that one of the gunmen was a member of the Intelligence Division of the Colombian National Police, called F-2. Speculation following the massacre centered on a number of police officers who lived in the area, members of the F-2 and of the judicial police. Because the victims were either very young or activists, it was apparent that this was not a gang shooting. A number of theories about the motivation for the crime appeared in the weeks afterward; that the attack was police retaliation for the killing of two police officers earlier that day, that the victims had been mistaken for a youth gang and killed by accident, or that the victims had been targeted because a number of them were activists. Later ballistics tests confirmed that the bullets used in the killings were those used by both the Colombian National Police and the Colombian Army.

Parents, relatives, and friends of the victims were outspoken about the crime, and publicly demanded justice. They claimed to have been intimidated immediately after the crime at the morgue. As the investigation continued, this intimidation, according to those related to the victims, increased. On the day that the official investigation concluded that wrongdoing had occurred and the names of those accused of committing the massacre had been passed on to the civilian courts, masked men went through the neighborhood searching for a number of people. The local Colombian Army base was alerted, and following a gunfight with the masked men, two of them were wounded and arrested. They were members of the judicial police who had falsified search warrants to hunt down witnesses.

Participants in the ensuing trial received numerous death threats. As a result, the trial and investigation were transferred to Bogotá. There remains no criminal verdict in the case, and Colonel Hernandez, the man accused of having ordered the attack, remains in his position with the police. A number of the other men who are accused of having been involved have been transferred.

By 1996, the government of Colombia had publicly acknowledged that its police officers had committed the attack, and apologized to the families of the victims. In 1998, a first attempt to reach a civil settlement related to the case failed. A second attempt, guided by the Inter-American Commission on Human Rights, succeeded in producing a settlement in 2002. In it, the government agreed to remunerate the victims, pay for the construction of a memorial to them in a park, and to pursue the criminal charges against the perpetrators. The anniversary of the massacre continues to be observed, and the monument to the victims required by the settlement was built in Parque del Periodista, the Park of Journalists.

== See also ==
- List of massacres in Colombia
