= Juan Carlos Patino-Arango =

Juan Carlos Patino-Arango was a Roman Catholic seminarian who is accused of child molestation and indecency. While studying in a Roman Catholic seminary, he allegedly molested four boys, who have since filed suit against him, the Archdiocese of Galveston-Houston, Archbishop Joseph Fiorenza and Pope Benedict XVI, charging that the church conspired to cover up the crime. A settlement was reached in the Houston church sex abuse case. In May 2005 in Texas, he was indicted on a felony criminal charge of indecency with a child.

== Diplomatic immunity request of Pope ==
When Pope Benedict was personally accused in a lawsuit of conspiring to cover up the molestation of three boys in Texas by Patino-Arango in Archdiocese of Galveston-Houston, he sought and obtained diplomatic immunity from prosecution. Some have claimed that this immunity was granted after intervention by then US President George W. Bush. The Department of State "recognize[d] and allow[ed] the immunity of Pope Benedict XVI from this suit."

== See also ==
- Catholic sex abuse cases
