= El Salado massacre =

2000 massacre in Colombia

El Salado Massacre
- Location: El Salado, Colombia
- Date: February 16, 2000-February 22, 2000
- Attack type: Mass murder
- Weapons: Chainsaws, light weapons, stones, sticks, iron mortars, ropes, hammers
- Deaths: +100
- Injuries: 1
- Victim: The citizens of El Salado
- Perpetrators: United Self-Defense Forces of Colombia : commanded by Luis Francisco Robles Mendoza, alias 'Amaury', Jhon Jairo Esquivel Cuadrado, 'the Tiger' and Uber Enrique Bánquez Martínez, 'Juancho Dique', under orders of Jorge 40, Salvatore Mancuso, Rodrigo Mercado Pelufo

The El Salado Massacre was a massacre committed in the Colombian town of El Salado in Montes de María, Bolívar between February 16 and 22, 2000, although other sources say that the massacre lasted for two weeks. The mass murder was committed by the Bloque Norte and Bloque Héroes de los Montes de María of the United Self-Defense Forces of Colombia (AUC), commanded by Rodrigo Tovar Pupo (alias 'Jorge 40'), and Rodrigo Mercado Pelufo (alias 'Cadena').

== Massacre ==
The criminal action in El Salado consisted of torture, beheadings, decapitations and rapes of an as yet undetermined number of defenseless peasants, among them a six-year-old girl and a 65-year-old woman; Initially, it was said that between 30 and 60 people were killed, but in June 2008 the Prosecutor's Office determined that there were more than 100, claiming that it could have been the largest massacre by the paramilitaries in their entire history.

The massacre was perpetrated by at least 450 men belonging to the paramilitary group, who also destroyed the homes and businesses of the population. It is considered one of the bloodiest known actions of the AUC.

14 of the bodies were found in four mass graves in a lot in the Villa del Rosario (El Salado) district, jurisdiction of the municipality of El Carmen de Bolívar, after being tortured and beheaded in the town church, others were massacred on a table located on the town's soccer field.

According to witnesses, the paramilitaries dismembered and tortured the residents with chainsaws, screwdrivers, stones, and wood while they drank liquor looted from stores, raped women, hanged young people, beat old people and pregnant women while listening to loud music. The massacre caused the displacement of at least 280 people, including men, women, and children.

== Perpetrators ==
The massacre was commanded by Nicolás Castellanos Duque, Jhon Jairo Esquivel Cuadrado, alias 'el Tigre', and Uber Enrique Bánquez Martínez, alias 'Juancho Dique'. It was ordered by Jorge 40 (Rodrigo Tovar Pupo), who during the Justice and Peace process said that it was the order of Carlos Castaño, the top commander of the AUC, and supported by Salvatore Mancuso, head of the Catatumbo Block, and Rodrigo Mercado Pelufo, alias "Cadena", head of the Héroes de los Montes de María Block. The then Navy Lieutenant Commander Héctor Martín Pita Vásquez is also accused of the massacre, and was called to trial by the Prosecutor's Office in February 2008.

== Aftermath and investigation ==
2009 report on the massacre by the National Commission of Reparation and Reconciliation (in Spanish)

== In popular culture ==
The El Salado Massacre is mentioned in the Mr. Robot episode "406 Not Acceptable," as having been bankrolled by the show's in-universe criminal organisation, the Deus Group.

The Colombian poet Eliana Hernández Pachón published a book entitled La mata; a poem based on the massacre.

The Colombian poet Omar Garzón published in his book Flores para un ocaso a poem entitled Camino para el olvido, dedicated to the victims of the El Salado massacre.

The Colombian poet Hellman Pardo published in his book El sol abre su oscura a poem entitled El Salado (Noises on the road), dedicated to the victims of the El Salado massacre.

== See also ==
- Colombian armed conflict
- List of acts of violence in the internal armed conflict in Colombia
- Area of Historical Memory
- Massacre of 7 CTI detectives of the Attorney General's Office
