= 2018 Colombia police stations attacks =

Terrorist incident in Colombia

- Part of Colombian conflict
- 2018 Colombia police stations attacks (Colombia)
- Location: Bolívar Department and Atlántico Department, Colombia
- Date: 27–28 January 2018; 6:40 am & 4:00 am
- Weapon: Grenade
- Deaths: 8
- Injuries: 48
- Perpetrator: ELN

The 2018 Colombia police stations attacks occurred on 27 and 28 January 2018 and claimed eight lives. In the 27 January attacks, two hand grenades were thrown at police stations in Barranquilla and Soledad. Five officers died in the attacks initially (a sixth died later on) and 48 people were wounded. The injured included some civilians. On January 28, two policemen died after an attack on a police station in Santa Rosa del Sur, bringing the death toll to seven. All the dead were serving officers in the National Police of Colombia.

The National Liberation Army (ELN) was responsible for the attacks on the police stations. The attacks were one of the deadliest on the security forces in the last few years in Colombia.

Colombian President Juan Manuel Santos suspended peace talks with the group afterwards.

== Victims ==
The dead victims of the third attack were Manuel Galvis Contreras and Ferney Alexander Posada.
