= Teresa Pizarro de Angulo =

- Born: Teresa Pizarro de Angulo; October 15, 1913; Cartagena, Colombia
- Died: April 28, 2000 (aged 86); Cartagena, Colombia
- Occupation: Real estate agent, businesswoman and philanthropist
- Title: President of the National Beauty Contest
- Children: 3

Teresa Pizarro de Angulo (Cartagena, October 15, 1913 – Ibidem, April 28, 2000) was a Colombian businesswoman, recognized for her association with the National Beauty Contest.

== Biography ==
=== Early years ===
She was the daughter of Edmundo Pizarro and Constancia Pareja. Her parents died when she was still a child, so she had to move in with her grandparents. She had four sisters.

She began working as a farmer when she was young to financially support to her family. She eventually became the first woman to own a farm in Cartagena. She later became a member of the Cartagena Lions Club, which helped her gain popularity among the city's residents.

=== Career ===
She began her professional career as a real estate agent, she was the first woman in Cartagena de Indias to practice the profession. In 1957, she was elected vice president of the National Beauty Board, the body that supervises the National Beauty Contest. Although she was not formally appointed president of the board until 1977, she was named president of Miss Colombia during the 1950s. During her tenure, she established charitable funds for organizations benefiting children and the elderly. She turned the organization's swimsuit contest into a charity event, allocating the money received to the aforementioned organizations.

Pizarro de Angulo bought a house in Cartagena and turned it into the venue for the contest. In 1996, she was named President Emeritus of the National Board of Beauty. However, she handed over the position to her son, Raimundo Angulo, because he had health problems. She maintained an active social life, attending multiple events and making public appearances, but her health continued to deteriorate after she stepped down from the board.

She collaborated with different charitable organizations, such as Las Merecedes Foundation (Bogotá), financed by funds raised in the National Beauty Contests, promoting projects to improve services in the community, such as the Eye Clinic of the Lions Club and the construction of the Barrio de Las Reinas.

She developed pulmonary fibrosis, a disease which would claim her life on April 28, 2000, at the age of 86.
