= 1939 Gachetá massacre =

1939 mass shooting in Colombia

- Location: Gachetá, Colombia
- Date: January 8, 1939
- Target: Colombian Conservative Party members and supporters
- Deaths: 9
- Injuries: 17
- Perpetrator: Uncertain

The Gachetá massacre was a mass shooting that took place on January 8, 1939, in the town of the same name, located in Cundinamarca, Colombia, approximately 100 km away from the capital, Bogotá. The events took place during the presidency of Eduardo Santos, a member of the Colombian Liberal Party.

Although this was an act of public order and not a political one, the Conservative Party took advantage of it. A scandal followed, as the El Siglo newspaper stated that the massacre had been ordered by the government of President Santos.

The details of the event have been controversial, but the official version showed a balance of 9 dead and 17 wounded, all related to the Colombian Conservative Party.
