= Machuca Massacre =

Mass murder of Colombian civilians by far-left guerillas

Machuca massacre
- Location: Machuca, Antioquia Department, Colombia
- Date: 18 October 1998; 2:00 am
- Attack type: bombing
- Deaths: 70
- Injuries: 30+
- Perpetrator: ELN

The Machuca massacre (Spanish: La Masacre de Machuca) was a massacre that took place in the Colombian village of Machuca, near Segovia, Antioquia on October 18, 1998. Guerillas belonging to the National Liberation Army (ELN) dynamited an oil pipeline, which caused a spreading fire to the village. Seventy people lost their lives, many of them children.

== Details ==
On October 18, 1998, members of the Cimarrones subgroup of the ELN bombed a section of the Ocensa pipeline in Antioquia Department. The blast caused a fireball of crude oil that engulfed the village of Machuca. At first, at least forty were believed to be killed. The death rate eventually hit 70. It was one of the deadliest incidents to civilians in the three decade long Colombian conflict.

== Aftermath ==
The ELN took responsibility for the bombing, but not the deaths. It said that the Colombian army were the ones who ignited the spilled oil. The head of the Colombian armed forces condemned the ELN.

On November 12, Nicolas Rodriguez, head of the ELN, said that the attack was a "grave mistake" and that they would investigate those responsible. State defense chiefs denied the allegations. The bombing hurt the credibility of the ELN, especially as it entered peace negotiations with the government just a week prior to the attack.

The pipeline was operated by BP. The Guardian reported that BP provided arms equipment to the Colombian army brigade guarding the pipeline, a claim it denied.

== See also ==
- List of massacres in Colombia
