= 1997 Colombian referendum =

26 October 1997
- I VOTE FOR PEACE, LIFE AND LIBERTY. I promise to be a builder of Peace and Social Justice, to protect life and to reject all violent actions and accept the Children's Mandate for Peace. I demand that the actors in the armed conflict : NO MORE WAR : resolve the armed conflict peacefully NO MORE ATROCITIES : respect International Humanitarian Law. Do not associate minors under 18 years of age to the war. do not murder Don't kidnap people. People don't disappear. Do not attack the population or deplete it by force. Do not link civilians to the armed conflict.

Results
Choice	Votes	%
Yes	8,978,614	91.49%
No	835,382	8.51%

An unofficial referendum on "peace, life and liberty" was held in Colombia on 26 October 1997, alongside regional and departmental elections. The referendum was organised as a private initiative, but the ballots were counted by the electoral authorities.

Whilst the referendum and elections were boycotted in rural areas due to pressure from guerrilla groups, urban voters voted heavily in favour, with over 90% of voters supporting the proposal.

== Results ==
Choice	Votes	%
For	8,978,614	91.49
Against	835,382	8.51
Total	9,813,996	100.00
Registered voters/turnout	20,496,366	–
Source: Direct Democracy
