= Rodrigo Tovar Pupo =

Colombian paramilitant

Rodrigo Tovar Pupo, (also known as Jorge 40, his nom de guerre; born 19 November 1960) was born in Valledupar, Colombia. He was the leader of the Northern Bloc of the United Self-Defense Forces of Colombia. He demobilized with his two thousand men strong group on March 10, 2006 in La Mesa, Department of Cesar.

A laptop computer belonging to Tovar contained information on over 550 murders and started the 2006 Para-political scandal in which several congressmen have been indicted for corruption.

From cattle owner and farmer, member of Fenalce and Fedearroz and a public official, pass to command 4500 men of the Northern Bloc that dominate the territories of Cesar, La Guajira, Magdalena, Atlántico and part of both Santander and Norte de Santander Departments.

"Just hearing his name instills fear in us", said a member of the Kankuamos, a native community from the Sierra Nevada de Santa Marta who accused him of the assassination of more than 100 of their members.

He is also accused of covertly masterminding the repression of the Aseguradoras del Régimen Subsidiado de Salud (ARS) (Spanish for Health Subsidized Regime Insurance) in many municipalities in the Caribbean Region as well as being the alleged ring leader of a loose confederation of drug traffickers operating in the eastern zone of the Sierra Nevada de Santa Marta (a coastal mountain range in northern Colombia) and La Guajira (and adjacent region bordering Venezuela). Due to these activities the United States Government has asked for his extradition in order to bring him to an American court.

Jorge 40 was indicted for masterminding the massacre of over 60 natives from the aboriginal Wayuu and Wiwa tribes in La Guajira and Magdalena provinces. They were allegedly executed by the Northern Bloc in 2004. Jorge 40 has also been connected to the death of 21 people in the municipality of Aracataca better known by its fictional name 'Macondo' (Magdalena).

The Organization of American States (OAS) denounced Jorge 40's paramilitary activities after alleged collusion with local government forces in order to kill eight people in Curumani, Cesar, accusing them of being informants of the ELN guerrilla. The massacre occurred between December 4 and December 5, 2005.

== Massacres ==
- Bahía Portete massacre
- Villanueva massacre

== Extradition to the United States ==
In the early morning of May 13, 2008 'Jorge 40' and twelve other paramilitary leaders were taken from their jail cells in a surprise action by the Colombian government. According to Colombian Interior Minister Carlos Holguin they have been refusing to comply to the country's Peace and Justice law and are therefore extradited to the United States.

The National Movement of State Crimes, a coalition of several victim organizations that have suffered from state or paramilitary violence, has asked "to return the paramilitary chiefs to the Colombian authorities so they may be processed by the ordinary justice system and not under the framework of the Law of Justice and Peace, since this framework benefits the victimizers and not the victims, since they have not told all of the truth, have not made comprehensive reparations to the victims, and have not dismantled their criminal structures."

The Office in Colombia of the United Nations High Commissioner for Human Rights stated that "[...] according to Colombian law, the reasons claimed by the President of the Republic to proceed with the previously-suspended extraditions are also grounds for their removal from the application of the ‘Law of Justice and Peace’ and for the loss of the benefits established therein".

The Inter-American Commission stated that this "affects the Colombian State's obligation to guarantee victims’ rights to truth, justice, and reparations for the crimes committed by the paramilitary groups. The extradition impedes the investigation and prosecution of such grave crimes through the avenues established by the Justice and Peace Law in Colombia and through the Colombian justice system's regular criminal procedures. It also closes the door to the possibility that victims can participate directly in the search for truth about crimes committed during the conflict, and limits access to reparations for damages that were caused. This action also interferes with efforts to determine links between agents of the State and these paramilitary leaders."

On August 18, 2020 Colombian radio station La W reported that Tovar Pupo will be released from the federal detention facility at Allenwood, PA and would likely be deported back to Colombia. According to the inmate locator feature for the Bureau of Prisons, Tovar Pupo’s release date was September 6, 2020 (inmate number 80517-004).

== Return to Colombia and reimprisonment ==
On September 29, 2020, following his release from prison in the United States, Tovar Pupo returned to Colombia. Upon arrival, he was immediately detained by authorities to face 1,486 investigative procedures. At the time of the arrest, Tovar Pupo had 65 arrest warrants and 109 detention orders in Colombia.

== See also ==
- Carlos Castaño Gil
- Salvatore Mancuso
- Colombian Armed Conflict
