= Jairo Zulbarán =

Colombian footballer (1970-2002)

Personal information
- Full name: Jairo Luís Zulbarán
- Date of birth: 7 January 1970
- Place of birth: Santa Marta, Colombia
- Date of death: 15 March 2002 (aged 32)
- Place of death: Santa Marta, Colombia
- Height: 1.75 m (5 ft 9 in)
- Position: Forward

Senior career*
Years	Team	Apps	(Gls)
1989–1991	Unión Magdalena		
1991	Sporting Club		
1992	Independiente Medellín		
1993-1995	Millonarios		
1995-1997	Unión Magdalena		
1997–1998	Unicosta		
Total		243	(51)

International career
1989–1992	Colombia U20		
- * Club domestic league appearances and goals

Jairo Luís Zulbarán, (Note: Sometimes written as "Sulbarán""Jairo CALANCHE SULBARAN - olympics.com".EFE (15 March 2002). "Asesinado ex jugador de fútbol Jairo Calanche Sulbarán". Caracol Radio (in Spanish).) known as Calanche (7 January 1970 – 15 March 2002), was a Colombian football forward.

== Club career ==
Born in Santa Marta, Zulbarán began his professional football career with Unión Magdalena and would play for Sporting de Barranquilla, Independiente Medellín, Real Cartagena, Millonarios and Unicosta. He is one of Unicosta's all-time leading goal-scorers. He ended his career early after having problems with his knee ligaments.

== International career ==
Zulbarán competed for Colombia at the 1989 FIFA World Youth Championship in Saudi Arabia and the 1992 Summer Olympics in Barcelona.

== Personal life and death ==
In March 2002, Zulbarán was shot dead in a public market in downtown Santa Marta.
