= Paime =

- Municipality and town
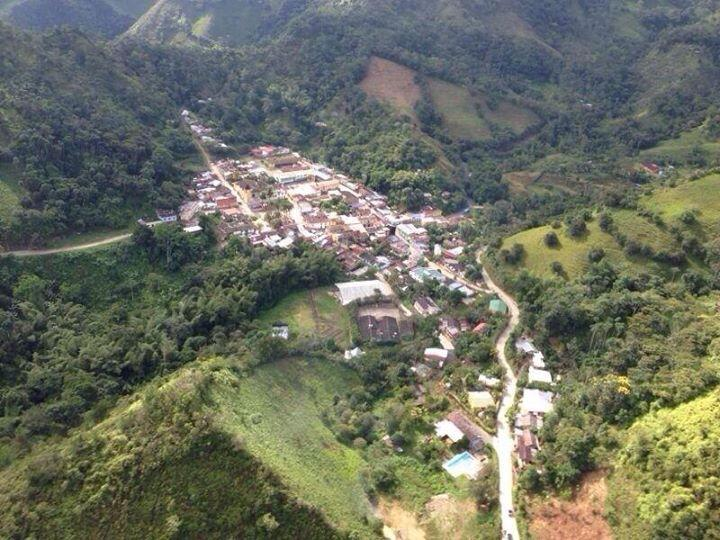

- Flag Coat of arms

- Location of the municipality and town inside Cundinamarca Department of Colombia

- Location in Colombia
- Coordinates: 5°22′N 74°9′W
- Country: Colombia
- Department: Cundinamarca
- Elevation: 960 m (3,150 ft)

Population (2015)
  - Total: 4,502
- Time zone: UTC-5 (Colombia Standard Time)
- Website: http://www.paime-cundinamarca.gov.co/

Paime is a municipality and town of Colombia in the department of Cundinamarca, belongs to the Rionegro region.
