= 1984 Diners Club shooting =

Massacres in Colombia

- The Otero Building
- Location: Otero, Cali, Colombia
- Date: December 3, 1984
- Attack type: mass shooting; mass murder; shooting; stabbing; mass stabbing
- Weapons: Revolver; Hunting knife
- Deaths: 9
- Injuries: 5
- Perpetrators: Jaime Serrano Santibañez; Luis Jamer Rodríguez Díaz; Francisco Antonio Ruíz Gómez

1984 Diners Club shooting was a robbery perpetrated by three common criminals in the Otero Building in Cali, Colombia, on December 3, 1984, which left nine dead and five wounded.

== Incident ==
On December 3, 1984, in a robbery at the Diners Club offices perpetrated by Jaime Serrano Santibañez (who had been a security guard at the establishment), Luis Jamer Rodríguez Díaz, and Francisco Antonio Ruíz Gómez, with the initial objective of stealing 885,000 pesos. In the robbery, they detained The Diners Club employees were held hostage inside the building for four hours, during which time nine of the hostages—seven women and two men—were murdered one by one with firearms and knives, and five more were wounded. After the massacre, the assailants left the building with a message written on a wall that read:

"Sorry Lalo, this is payback. Next time you must cooperate with us like you did the first time."

One of the building's security guards faked his death after being attacked, and once the assailants fled, he reported the incident to the Colombian National Police.

The following day, Jaime Serrano and Luis Rodríguez were captured and sentenced to 30 years in prison along with Francisco Ruiz, alias "Frank." The latter was tried in absentia since he could not be apprehended. Days later, the criminal known as "José Fedor Rey" or "Javier Delgado" announced that Francisco Ruiz had been killed by guerrillas, although other accounts claim he had fled to Venezuela.

In 2002, Jaime Serrano and Luis Rodríguez were released after receiving reduced sentences for good behavior.

== In popular culture ==
- The Gaze of the Condemned. Miniseries by Telepacífico (2019).
- The Gaze of the Condemned. The Diners Club Massacre. (2024) Óscar Osorio and James Valderrama.
