= Carlos Arturo Marulanda =

Carlos Arturo Marulanda Ramirez

Colombia Ambassador to Belgium
- In office 1991–1997
- President: Cesar Gaviria; Ernesto Samper

Colombia Ambassador to Luxembourg
- In office 1991–1997
- President: Cesar Gaviria; Ernesto Samper

Colombia Ambassador to the European Union
- In office 1991–1997
- President: Cesar Gaviria; Ernesto Samper

Minister of Economic Development
- In office 1988–1990
- President: Virgilio Barco Vargas

Personal details
- Born: November 25, 1945 (age 80)
- Education: Harvard University; University of Cambridge
- Profession: Politician, Diplomat

Carlos Arturo Marulanda Ramirez (born November 25, 1945) is a Colombian politician and diplomat. Marulanda served as Minister of Economic Development from 1988 to 1990 under the Presidency of Virgilio Barco Vargas. Shortly after, he became Ambassador to Belgium, the European Union and non-resident ambassador to Luxemburg.

In 2002, he was extradited back to Colombia by the Spanish government to answer charges relating to Right-wing paramilitarism in Colombia.

== Additional sources ==
- "El caso Marulanda". Semana (in Spanish). August 20, 2001. Archived from the original on May 26, 2016.
