= Santa Rosa del Sur =

Coordinates: 7°58′N 74°03′W

- Municipality and town
- Flag

- Location of the municipality and town of Santa Rosa del Sur in the Bolívar Department of Colombia
- Country: Colombia
- Department: Bolívar Department

Area
  - Municipality and town: 2,800 km^{2} (1,100 sq mi)
- Elevation: 650 m (2,130 ft)

Population (2015)
  - Municipality and town: 42,003
  - Urban: 22,563
- Time zone: UTC-5 (Colombia Standard Time)

San Rosa del Sur (Spanish pronunciation: [ˈsanta ˈrosa ðel suɾ]) is a town and municipality located in the Bolívar Department, northern Colombia, around 720 km away from the department's capital, Cartagena.

== Climate ==
Climate data for Santa Rosa del Sur (Sta Rosa D Simiti), elevation 700 m (2,300 ft), (1981–2010)
Month	Jan	Feb	Mar	Apr	May	Jun	Jul	Aug	Sep	Oct	Nov	Dec	Year
Mean daily maximum °C (°F)	30.3 (86.5)	31.1 (88.0)	30.5 (86.9)	29.2 (84.6)	28.5 (83.3)	28.6 (83.5)	29.0 (84.2)	28.9 (84.0)	28.4 (83.1)	28.0 (82.4)	28.2 (82.8)	29.2 (84.6)	29.2 (84.6)
Daily mean °C (°F)	25.3 (77.5)	25.9 (78.6)	25.8 (78.4)	25.1 (77.2)	24.7 (76.5)	24.9 (76.8)	25.0 (77.0)	24.9 (76.8)	24.4 (75.9)	24.0 (75.2)	24.2 (75.6)	24.7 (76.5)	24.9 (76.8)
Mean daily minimum °C (°F)	20.7 (69.3)	21.2 (70.2)	21.6 (70.9)	21.5 (70.7)	21.3 (70.3)	21.3 (70.3)	21.1 (70.0)	20.9 (69.6)	20.7 (69.3)	20.5 (68.9)	20.8 (69.4)	20.9 (69.6)	21.0 (69.8)
Average precipitation mm (inches)	12.7 (0.50)	24.8 (0.98)	77.9 (3.07)	163.2 (6.43)	234.9 (9.25)	227.6 (8.96)	212.1 (8.35)	240.4 (9.46)	212.9 (8.38)	192.8 (7.59)	124.4 (4.90)	38.0 (1.50)	1,756.2 (69.14)
Average precipitation days (≥ 1.0 mm)	2	3	6	12	16	15	14	15	16	16	11	4	127
Average relative humidity (%)	73	71	74	82	85	84	83	84	85	86	85	79	81
Mean monthly sunshine hours	248.0	194.8	164.3	123.0	136.4	159.0	201.5	189.1	147.0	130.2	147.0	207.7	2,048
Mean daily sunshine hours	8.0	6.9	5.3	4.1	4.4	5.3	6.5	6.1	4.9	4.2	4.9	6.7	5.6
Source: Instituto de Hidrologia Meteorologia y Estudios Ambientales

Climate data for Santa Rosa del Sur (Canelos) (1981–2010)
Month	Jan	Feb	Mar	Apr	May	Jun	Jul	Aug	Sep	Oct	Nov	Dec	Year
Mean daily maximum °C (°F)	27.0 (80.6)	27.6 (81.7)	27.5 (81.5)	26.9 (80.4)	26.8 (80.2)	27.3 (81.1)	27.3 (81.1)	27.5 (81.5)	26.9 (80.4)	26.4 (79.5)	26.0 (78.8)	26.6 (79.9)	27 (81)
Daily mean °C (°F)	21.8 (71.2)	22.1 (71.8)	22.3 (72.1)	22.1 (71.8)	22.2 (72.0)	22.3 (72.1)	22.3 (72.1)	22.4 (72.3)	22.0 (71.6)	21.7 (71.1)	21.6 (70.9)	21.7 (71.1)	22.0 (71.6)
Mean daily minimum °C (°F)	16.4 (61.5)	17.0 (62.6)	17.8 (64.0)	18.3 (64.9)	18.4 (65.1)	18.1 (64.6)	17.8 (64.0)	17.9 (64.2)	18.0 (64.4)	18.0 (64.4)	17.7 (63.9)	17.1 (62.8)	17.7 (63.9)
Average precipitation mm (inches)	45.0 (1.77)	70.4 (2.77)	116.2 (4.57)	213.2 (8.39)	261.4 (10.29)	224.9 (8.85)	212.0 (8.35)	236.9 (9.33)	237.0 (9.33)	247.4 (9.74)	196.8 (7.75)	92.4 (3.64)	2,088.5 (82.22)
Average precipitation days (≥ 1.0 mm)	6	7	11	15	18	16	16	16	17	18	16	9	158
Average relative humidity (%)	85	84	86	88	88	87	86	86	87	88	88	87	87
Mean monthly sunshine hours	182.9	146.8	114.7	84.0	111.6	117.0	164.3	158.1	117.0	111.6	117.0	155.0	1,580
Mean daily sunshine hours	5.9	5.2	3.7	2.8	3.6	3.9	5.3	5.1	3.9	3.6	3.9	5.0	4.3
Source: Instituto de Hidrologia Meteorologia y Estudios Ambientales
