= Buenavista, Córdoba =

Coordinates: 8.68333°N 75.25°W

- Municipality and town
- Flag Coat of arms

- Location of the municipality and town of Buenavista, Córdoba in the Córdoba Department of Colombia.
- Country: Colombia
- Department: Córdoba Department

Population (Census 2018)
  - Total: 18,344
- Time zone: UTC-5 (Colombia Standard Time)

Buenavista is a town and municipality located in the Córdoba Department, northern Colombia. According to 2018 estimates, the population of Buenavista was 18,344.
