= Reminiscencias dance club shooting =

2000 mass shooting in Bogotá, Colombia

- Location: 4.6166°N 74.1728°W; Bogotá, Colombia
- Date: 23 June 2000; 11:45 p.m. – c. 11:50 p.m. (COT)
- Target: Reminiscencias tavern
- Attack type: Mass murder, mass shooting
- Weapon: Uzi
- Deaths: 11 (including one of the perpetrators)
- Injuries: 7
- Perpetrators: Juan de Jesús Lozano Velásquez; Henry Orozco Casas; Julián Andrés Barbosa González
- Motive: Revenge for lost fight
- Convictions: 40 years imprisonment
- Convicted: Juan de Jesús Lozano Velásquez; Henry Orozco Casas; Leonardo Melo Nieto

On 23 June 2000, a mass shooting occurred in the Reminiscencias club in Bogotá, Colombia. Eleven people were killed and seven were injured before the perpetrator, 26-year-old Juan de Jesús Lozano Velásquez, fled the scene. Two others, Henry Orozco Casas and Leonardo Melo Nieto, were arrested as accomplices, while one of the dead, Julián Andrés Barbosa, was posthumously identified as an accomplice who was accidentally killed after being mistaken for a surviving victim by the shooter.

Lozano remained a fugitive for eleven months. In May 2001, Spanish authorities reported that Lozano had escaped to Madrid under a false name and that he had been held in custody since October 2000 for robbery. A fingerprint samples confirmed his identity, but an extradition was denied. In 2002, Lozano was convicted of robbery by a Madrid court. In 2003, a Bogotá court sentenced Lozano, Orozco and Melo to 40 years imprisonment.

== Incident ==
=== Background ===
Reminiscencias was a tavern opened in 1986 and run by the Aristizábal brothers, Carlos Arturo and Rodrigo. It was located on an intersection of Avenida Primero de Mayo No 34-10 in Barrio San Jorge Sur. The club consisted of a 50 square metres (540 sq ft) space with a mezzanine. The establishment was popular with Paisa people originally from Caldas Department. The area was frequented by the Sanandresitos, a nickname for black market merchants from Barrio San Andresito.

On the evening of the shooting, at about 10:00 p.m., a man identified only as "Miguel" entered Reminiscencias to join his girlfriend, 25-year-old Johana Pinzón González, who was at the bar with friends. The pair had met a month earlier at an event for residents of Pensilvania, Caldas. Miguel and Pinzón danced and drank alone together, but after a while, she began to complain about her male friends at their table. Miguel agreed to solve the issue and confronted Pinzón's friends. After a verbal argument, Miguel hurriedly went to leave the premises, saying goodbye to Pinzón and preparing to drive off on his motorcyle outside. One of Pinzón's friends had followed Miguel outside and made a gesture under his jacket indicating that he had a gun.

Two cars, a Fiat Palio and a Mazda, pulled up to Reminiscencias, carrying four friends of Miguel: Juan de Jesús Lozano Velásquez, Julián Andrés Barbosa González, Henry Orozco Casas, and a man only identified as "Darío", all of whom had alleged ties to Sanandresitos. The group asked Miguel why he was leaving, at which point Miguel told them of his argument earlier. When the man who had followed Miguel went back inside, Miguel and his companions pursued him, leading to a brawl between Pinzón's friends and Miguel's group inside the club. Miguel's brother arrived to defuse the situation, convincing everyone to stop fighting and imploring Miguel's group to go home. Miguel left on his motorcycle while his brother drove home in his car. Pinzón stayed to party with her group. By this point, around fifty patrons were inside the building.

=== Shooting ===
While Miguel's friends also left in their vehicles, they threatend Pinzón's group that they would return and drove to an apartment in the nearby Barrio San Eusebio, where they retrieve a mini-Uzi submachine gun. Darío refused to participate and left, with only Lozano, Barbosa, and Orozco driving back towards the bar. The trio parked one block away from Reminiscencias and walked the rest, with Lozano hiding the gun under his leather jacket.

As the trio stepped inside through the front entrance, Lozano immediately opened fire on customers and staff while shouting insults. Over the course of less than five minutes, over 65 rounds were fired, using three magazines in the process. Seven people were killed and ten injured, including three with fatal wounds. Lozano and Orozco had turned back to leave, with Barbosa a distance behind them, when Lozano again fired into the club, after hearing someone behind him screaming. The gunfire accidentally struck Barbosa, whom Lozano and Orozco then attempted to help, but he was left behind after urging the two to escape due to the approaching police sirens. Police arrived on-site seconds later and believing Barbosa to be another victim, officers rendered first aid and transported him to Olaya Polyclinic, where he died minutes after arrival. Before the arrival of ambulances, taxi drivers drove injured victims to hospitals, continuing to aid first responders in transport throughout the night. The Public Prosecutor's Office sending out special agents of Unidad de Reacción Inmediata (URI). A search was launched for the suspects, which ended at 4:30 a.m. on 24 June, after police recovered the getaway vehicle, the Fiat Palio, on a street in Barrio Quiroga, around ten minutes from Reminiscencias. That same day, Bogotá Police Chief Argemiro Serna announced a reward of COP$15,000,000 (around US$7,000) for information that would lead to the arrest of the gunman.

== Victims ==
- Carlos Arturo Aristizábal, 34, owner of the bar
- Ricardo Javier Ariza Gil, 28
- Rafael María Avila Barrios, 53
- Julián Andrés Barbosa González, 22 (accomplice of Lozano)
- Juan Carlos Bedoya, 27
- Nelson Orlando Castro, 22
- Néstor Alberto Granada, 28
- Marta Liliana Londoño Castro, 32
- Consuelo Patricia Menjura, 41
- Javier Darío Moreno Millán, 35
- John Jairo Ospina, 24, nephew of Carlos Aristizábal

Those wounded were: Rodrigo Aristizábal, 39, Jhon Jairo Bedoya, 34, Camilo José Moreno, 22, Kelly Fernanda Ospina Orozco, 20, Oscar Iván Ospina, 19, Arley Pinzón, 29, and Fabián Alberto Granada, 36.

== Investigation ==
The two potential getaway vehicles were first misidentified as a Corsa and a Montero. "Miguel" was initially misidentified as the gunman, but he turned himself in to police to prove his innocence. There were initially rumours of 18 fatalities and that the gunman was motivated by anger over a woman refusing a dance. The actual chronology of events was established by the witness testimony of "Miguel", Johana Pinzón, a waiter who was close to the entrance, and two other survivors. Cuerpo Técnico de Investigación (CTI) also stated that the gunman likely fled on foot at a leisurely pace. The community of Samaná, Caldas reported that Lozano was unable to run due to having three bullets lodged in his back and one in his hip, allegedly from an attempted assassination by hitmen who were hired to kill Lozano for the murder of a local emerald mine owner. Investigators believe that the shooting was committed in a drunken state out of anger over being beaten in a fight.

=== Fugitive and arrest ===
Using a forged passport, Lozano took the false identity of John Haider Pardo Zamudio, presenting himself as a priest to gain entry into Spain. He became involved with a gang of thieves and Spanish court records indicated that he was already noted for two other theft cases, but released after a few weeks of custody. On 17 October 2000, while living in Chamberí, Madrid, Lozano and another Colombian national, 28-year-old Carlos Arturo Salamanca Montenegro, robbed José María González Alvarez, a jewelry salesman who was unloading merchandise from his car's trunk in Aluche. After initially threatening to shoot González, the pair struck him and took one of his cases. The two robbers fled a few blocks, pursued by González and two off-duty National Police Corps officers, and upon being cornered, Lozano fired at the officers with an Astra pistol. The loot, worth several tens of million in Spanish peseta, was recovered while Lozano and Salamanca were arrested, with a third accomplice fleeing the scene in a car.

Lozano's true identity was discovered after his finger prints were taken on 13 May 2001. General Luis Ernesto Gilibert stated that investigators already suspected Lozano's presence in Spain and that Spanish police notified them of a potential match for Lozano after his arrest in October 2000. A DIJIN commission travelled to Madrid in early May 2001 to verify the claim. The day after the finger print match, the Office of the Attorney General of Colombia requested a formal extradition request to be made through the Ministry of Foreign Affairs, charging Lozano with aggravated homicide, attempted homicide, and illegal possession of weapons. There was speculation by Spanish media that Lozano might have acted as a contract killer in both Colombia and Spain, but the theory was never substantiated.

== Legal proceedings ==
On 18 March 2002, section 17 of the Provincial Court of Madrid sentenced Lozano and Salamanca to five years imprisonment for robbery and personal injury. Lozano received an additional two-year sentence for illegally carrying weapons. Lozano was set to serve his sentence at Madrid Penitentiary Center 3 Valdemoro, with possible extradition upon serving three-quarters of his sentence. In August 2003, the 42nd Criminal Circuit of Bogotá sentenced Lozano, Orozco and a third man, Leonardo Melo Nieto, to 40 years imprisonment in a trial in absentia. Lozano was still imprisoned in Valdemoro while Orozco and Melo were not in jail as the statutory time for detention had already run out, but their recapture was ordered for them to serve the sentence. A request for Lozano's extradition was also renewed.

== See also ==
- List of massacres in Colombia
