= Juan Patiño (footballer, born 2001) =

Colombian footballer

Personal information
- Full name: Juan Sebastián Patiño Sánchez
- Date of birth: 1 February 2001 (age 25)
- Place of birth: Puerto Tejada, Colombia
- Height: 1.75 m (5 ft 9 in)
- Position: Left winger

Youth career
- 2019: Universidad de Concepción

Senior career*
Years	Team	Apps	(Gls)
2020–2023	Universidad de Concepción	26	(0)
- * Club domestic league appearances and goals as of 14 April 2024

Juan Sebastián Patiño Sánchez (born 1 February 2001) is a Colombian footballer who plays as a left winger. He last played for Chilean club Universidad de Concepción.

== Club career ==
Born and raised in Puerto Tejada, a town located on the outskirts of Cali, Patiño started to play football in his hometown, where he was spotted. He then got the opportunity to move to Chile at a young age, to fulfill his dream as a footballer.

Patiño joined Universidad Concepción in March 2019 at the age of 18. Two weeks after his arrival, he was promoted to the clubs reserve team and already one month later, he was on the bench for the first team squad in Copa Chile. However, he was not given the chance in the cup.

On 1 October 2020, Patiño got his official debut for Universidad Concepción in the Chilean Primera División against Palestino. Patiño ended the 2020 season with 14 appearances in the Primera División.
