= 2007 Balsillas massacre =

Series of shootings in Colombia

- Location within the Caquetá Department Location within Colombia
- Location: Guillermo Ríos Mejía school, Balsillas, Caqueta, Colombia
- Date: June 10, 2007
- Target: Attendances at a San Pedrito party at the Guillermo Ríos Mejía school
- Attack type: Mass shooting, school shooting
- Weapons: Service rifles
- Deaths: 6
- Injuries: 3
- Perpetrators: Alberto Jiménez Rodríguez; Jair Farfán Moore
- Motive: Dispute after the principal refused to provide alcohol

On June 10, 2007, two shootings in a school and an estate in Balsillas, Colombia left a total of 6 dead and 3 injured. The shooters 21-year-old Yeimer Alberto Jiménez Rodríguez, and 20-years old Jair Farfán Moore were arrested after trying to escape.

== Background ==
Colombia registered a critic increase of false positives murders between 2000 and 2009, with the murders peaking in 2002–2008, and at least 6,402 victims in the country.

== Shooting ==
On June 10, 2007, civilians were attending a San Pedrito party inside the Guillermo Ríos Mejía school. Two soldiers, Yeimer Alberto Jiménez Rodríguez and Jair Farfán Moore deserted their military base and attended the party while drunk.

The soldiers asked Marlene Berrío, the school principal, for more alcohol, but she refused, arguing that they were already drunk. They quickly opened fire with their duty weapons in the schoolyard, killing Marlene Berrío, Jair Giraldo, and Lucas Corredor; two other men were injured but survived by playing dead. After the shooting, both soldiers escaped to the estate "La blanca"; in the estate they yelled asking for money and the keys of a motorbike. After being denied, they forced their entrance where a couple who previously attended the party were sleeping. Inside they killed Miller Velásquez, his wife Melania Bentacur and his son Alejandro Velásquez. They also injured the second son of the family, who managed to escape. Hours later they were arrested by the military.

=== Victims ===
- Marlene Berrío (55-year-old)
- Jair Giraldo (28-year-old)
- Lucas Corredor (33-year-old)
- Miller Velásquez (38-year-old)
- Alejandro Velásquez (9-year-old)
- Melania Bentacur

== Aftermath ==
Shortly after the shootings, around 1,500 people accompanied by local leaders marched asking for justice, and an investigation on the military.

The UN released a statement condemning the crime and calling for an investigation, as well as the implementation of necessary measures to prevent similar acts.

Both soldiers were arrested and charged with aggravated murder and illegal possession of firearms exclusively of military use. On August 29, 2007, they were found guilty and sentenced to 40 years in prison. According to the judge, the fact that they were active soldiers and their duty was to protect the community aggravated their crimes.

In June 2009, it was reported that Merlin Berrio's daughter, Claudia, had been fighting for more sanctions in the case, especially against the commander of the military base where both soldiers were stationed. Although the United Nations, the Ombudsman's Office, and the Human Rights Commission of the House of Representatives were involved in these complaints, by 2009 there had still been no resolution.
