= Centro Andino bombing =

2017 terrorist incident in Colombia

- Part of the Colombian conflict
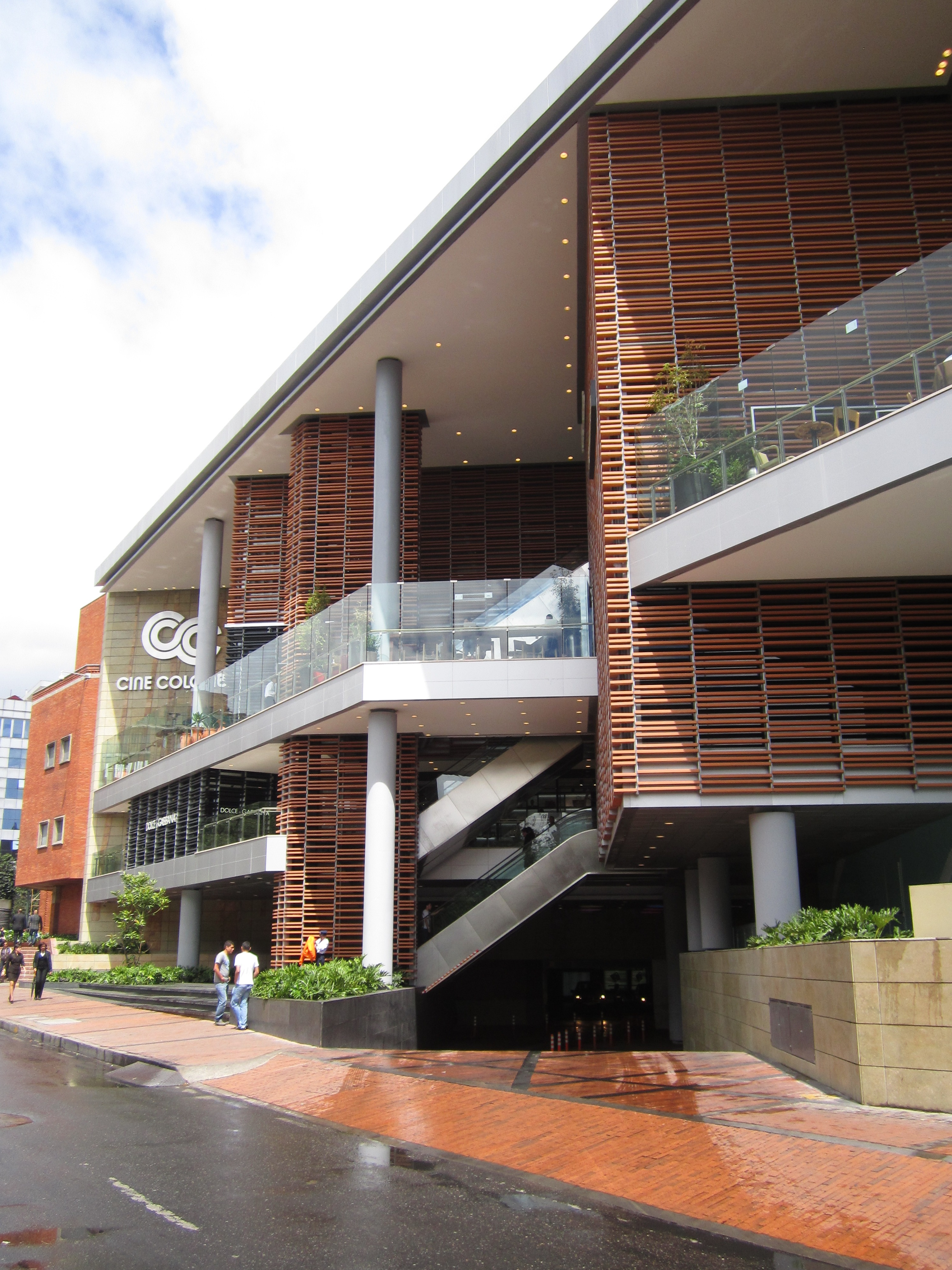
- Centro Andino shopping mall in Bogotá
- Location: Bogotá, Colombia
- Date: 17 June 2017; 5:00 pm
- Attack type: bombing
- Weapon: IED
- Deaths: 3
- Injuries: 9
- Motive: unknown

The Andino Mall bombing happened on the afternoon of 17 June 2017 in Bogotá, Colombia. Three young women were killed and 9 people were injured. One of those killed was a French national; the other two were Colombian citizens. The two Colombians were severely injured in the bombing and died later in a hospital. The bomb exploded behind a toilet bowl in the women's bathroom on the second floor at approximately 5 pm.

== Responsibility ==
Police arrested eight members of a small far-left urban guerilla group called the People’s Revolutionary Movement (Movimiento Revolucionario del Pueblo, MRP) a week after the bombing. The group has only been known since 2015 and are suspected of 14 other attacks in Colombia. The organisation has denied any responsibility in the attack.

== Reactions ==
In response to the bombing, Colombian President Juan Manuel Santos said "we won't let terrorism fright us". Bogotá mayor Enrique Peñalosa called it a "cowardly terrorist bombing". The United Nations condemned the attack and said the following: "The UN in Colombia regrets and repudiates this act of violence and reiterates that terrorism in all its forms and manifestations constitutes a threat to peace and security. We remain determined to continue to support Colombians and their government in their efforts to build sustainable and lasting peace in the country." President of France Emmanuel Macron tweeted on the French woman that died, "At 23, a volunteer in Bogota, a compatriot lost her life there in an explosion. Sadness and condolences for her loved ones." Mexican President Enrique Peña Nieto also expressed himself in a tweet in Spanish saying "México condena enérgicamente el acto de violencia cometido en Bogotá. Nuestra solidaridad con los familiares de las víctimas y los heridos." (Mexico strongly condemns the act of violence committed in Bogotá. Our solidarity with the families of the victims and those injured.) There were also other countries and ambassadors that publicly condemned the attack through social media.
