= Northern Bloc of the AUC =

- Leaders: Salvatore Mancuso; Rodrigo Tovar Pupo; Vicente Castaño
- Dates active: Officially completed demobilization in March 2006.
- Active regions: Cesar, La Guajira, Magdalena, Atlántico, Santander, and Norte de Santander
- Ideology: Anti-communism
- Part of: United Self-Defense Forces of Colombia
- Wars: Colombian armed conflict

The Northern Bloc of the United Self-Defense Forces of Colombia (Spanish: Bloque Norte de las AUC) was a Colombian paramilitary organization that operated until March 2006, when it demobilized. A National Center for Historical Memory report found that the group perpetrated 456 massacres from 1996 to 2006.

The Northern Bloc of the United Self-Defense Forces of Colombia (AUC) was one of the main blocs that made up this paramilitary organization in northern Colombia. The Northern Bloc participated in the Colombian internal armed conflict and controlled areas in the Colombian departments of Cesar, Magdalena, La Guajira, and Atlántico, and occasionally operated in the departments of Córdoba, Sucre, Santander, Norte de Santander, and Bolívar.

According to figures from the Justice and Peace Unit of the Office of the Attorney General of Colombia, the Northern Bloc committed 333 massacres under the command of its leader Rodrigo Tovar Pupo, alias "Jorge 40," in four departments of the Colombian Caribbean region. According to Tovar's subordinates, the Northern Bloc was responsible for approximately 20,000 criminal acts that affected more than 25,000 people.

History Background The Northern Bloc was founded in the department of Cesar, under the leadership of Salvatore Mancuso and his university-era friend Rodrigo Tovar Pupo, alias "Jorge 40," along with several members of traditional landowning families from the region such as the Castro and Araújo Molina families, and in alliance with various drug-trafficking clans like the Gnecco clan.

Initially, these new groups emerged with the creation of legal security groups under the CONVIVIR program, linked to the ACCU, whose purpose was to form self-defense groups against guerrilla forces, as the FARC-EP, ELN, and EPL dissidents, fueled by drug trafficking in the 1980s and 1990s, had managed to seize control of the region from the State in rural areas and urban centers through urban cells. The narco-guerrillas, especially guerrilla units such as the 41st and 59th Fronts of the FARC-EP's Caribbean Bloc and the ELN's José Manuel Quiroz Front, carried out numerous murders, kidnappings, cattle thefts, extortion of businessmen, merchants, and ranchers, forced recruitment of civilians, and torture. The guerrillas carried out multiple attacks and takeovers against small towns. Ground transportation became impossible due to constant roadblocks by the narco-guerrillas to carry out kidnappings, known as 'miraculous catches.'

Carlos Castaño and Salvatore Mancuso partnered with Jorge Gnecco Cerchar to establish the CONVIVIR Guaymaral. Hugues Rodríguez, a friend of Jorge 40 whose sister had been kidnapped and brutally murdered by the ELN after paying extortion, established the CONVIVIR Salguero. In the southern part of the department of Cesar, the CONVIVIR Los Arrayanes was led by Juan Francisco Prada Márquez, alias "Juancho Prada," and Martiniano Prada Gamarra, while the CONVIVIR Renacer was led by Roberto Prada Delgado. Another CONVIVIR in central Magdalena was created by "Chepe" Barrera under the name Guayacanes but was owned by rancher Luis José Botero Salazar.

Origin On May 4, 1997, Salvatore Mancuso, Rodrigo Tovar alias "Jorge 40," and Hernando de Jesús Fontalvo alias "El Pájaro" were temporarily detained while transporting a shipment of weapons along the road between the departments of La Guajira and Cesar, after a meeting with smuggler and Liberal politician Santa Lopesierra. Despite the weapons shipment, the police allowed them to pass following the intervention of police officer Danilo González and a bribe paid to some prosecutors. This incident became a whispered rumor in Valledupar society, confirming that Rodrigo Tovar was involved in and commanding self-defense groups. The following year, Tovar was arrested again while transporting weapons on a road between Valledupar and Codazzi but was once again released.

Society was overwhelmed by the violence caused by the guerrillas and cartel narco-terrorism, and they saw Tovar as a kind of hero. According to María Teresa Ronderos, in her book "Recycled Wars," in the department of Cesar alone in 1997, there were an alarming 138 extortion kidnappings, and the following year, 324 kidnappings. The Northern Bloc received support from sympathizers within intelligence agencies like DAS, as well as the Colombian police and military forces. Colonel Hernán Mejía Gutiérrez was a strong ally of the Northern Bloc paramilitaries between 2002 and 2004. In DAS, they had Jorge Noguera as a supporter.

Narco-Paramilitarism and Mafia As the Colombian armed conflict escalated, some self-defense groups decided to adopt the funding methods of the narco-guerrillas to match the financial resources they used to purchase weapons and recruit personnel, which they called a "war tax." They extorted civilians, merchants, businessmen, multinational corporations, and groups involved in drug trafficking and smuggling through threats. In some cases, they diverted state resources directly into their finances. Civilian recruitment also became forced, and they attacked towns they considered sponsors of the narco-guerrillas.

The influence of narco-paramilitarism infiltrated politics and government at the national, regional, and local levels. With the Parapolitics scandal, the Northern Bloc managed to place politicians in high government spheres, control entities, and infiltrate police, military, and intelligence agencies.

This is how the Northern Bloc helped elect politicians such as Zulema Jattin, Dieb Maloof, Álvaro García Romero, and David Char.

Crimes and Human Rights Violations In addition to the 333 massacres, the Northern Bloc is attributed with numerous cases of targeted killings. Notable victims include:

- Adán Pacheco: Former president of the Electricaribe union.
- Alfredo Correa De Andreis: University professor.
- Pedro Pérez Orozco: Former government secretary of the Barranquilla District and human rights defender.
- Eislen Escalante Pérez: Advisor to displaced individuals seeking land in a Magdalena River islet.
- Miguel Espinosa Rangel: Leader of displaced persons.
- José Mendivil: Traffic union leader.
- Gustavo de Silvestri: President of the Coolechera Cooperative Administration Council and several union members.
- Antonio José Muñoz Vizcaín: Secretary of Health of Sabanalarga.
- José Castillo: Candidate for mayor of Soledad, Atlántico in 2003.

According to Alias "Don Antonio," as a front commander, he instructed paramilitaries under his command not to "kill more than three people at a time to avoid media and authority pressure."

According to El Espectador, "Barranquilla was the city most affected by paramilitaries with 1,664 murders between 2003 and 2006, followed by Soledad with 572, and Malambo with 116."

Some individuals survived assassination attempts by the AUC. One of the most notorious failed attempts was the assassination ordered by Alias "Jorge 40" on October 25, 2004, in Barranquilla against contractor José Manuel Daes, known as "Yuyo Daes."

Finances The Northern Bloc of the AUC received income from drug trafficking, taxes on illegal drug producers and micro-traffickers, extortion, public fund diversions, smuggling, land theft, property usurpation, and "gota a gota" loans.

The Northern Bloc concealed its finances through multiple front organizations.

Demobilization The Northern Bloc demobilized between February 8 and 10, 2006, in the department of Cesar with two groups, one in the Chimila district of El Copey municipality, and the other in the hamlet of 'El Mamón,' Azúcar Buena district (La Mesa) in Valledupar.
