= Awa-Kwaiker =

Indigenous people of Ecuador and Colombia

Awá (Kwaiker)
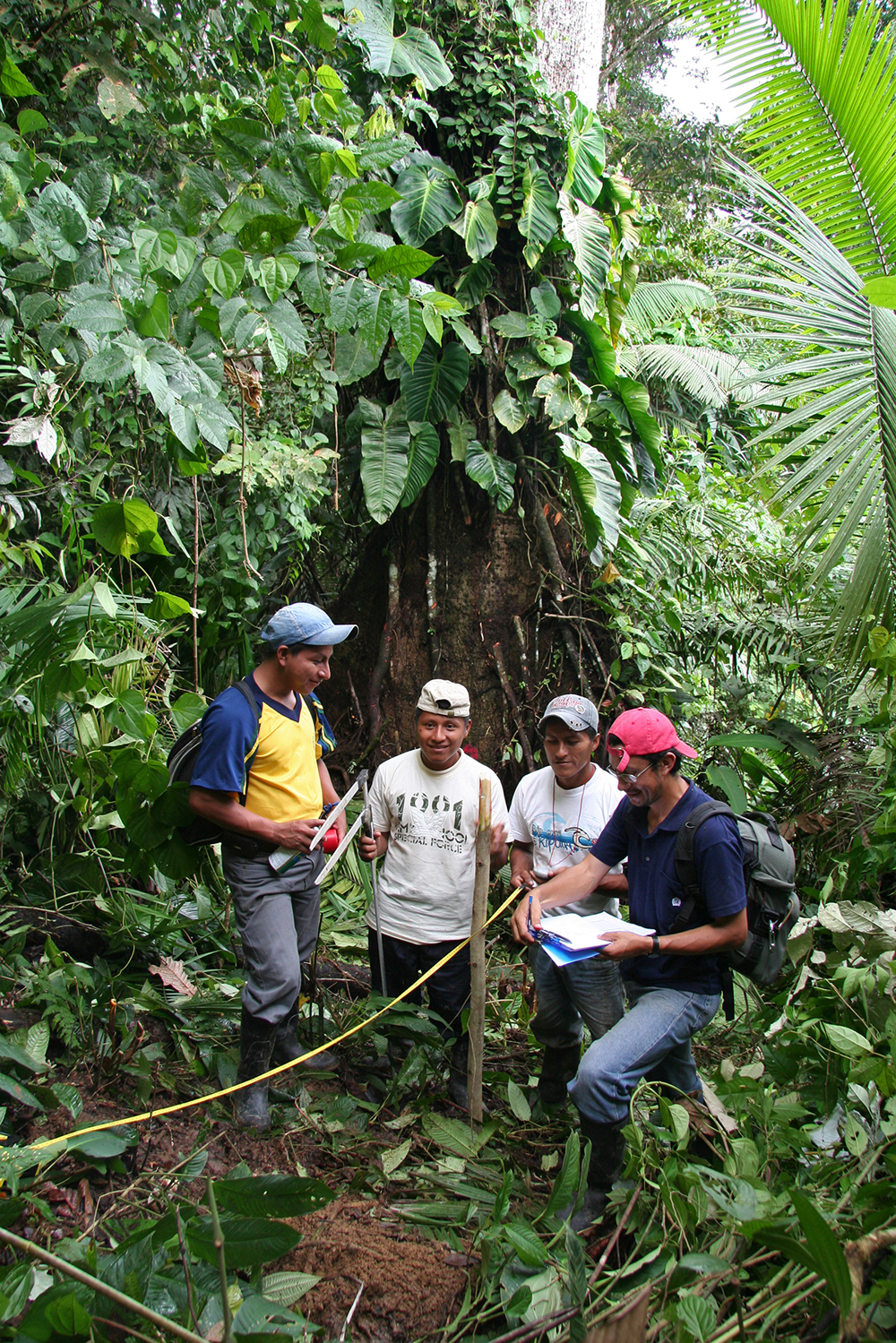

Total population
- 32,555

Regions with significant populations
- Ecuador: 6,000–8,000 (1987)
- Colombia: 3,000 (1987)

Languages
- Awapit language

The Awá, also known as the Kwaiker or Awa-Kwaiker, are an Indigenous people of Ecuador and Colombia. They primarily inhabit the provinces of Carchi and Sucumbios in northern Ecuador and southern Colombia, particularly the departments of Nariño and Putumayo. Their population is around 32,555. They speak the Awa Pit language.

== Reserve ==
The Awa Reserve was established in northwestern Ecuador in 1987. The reserve combines Indigenous and forestry legislature, so that the Awa people could manage the forest and their own lands. This reserve is in the Choco Forest within the Tumbes-Chocó-Magdalena region, one of the most biodiverse places on the planet; however, logging and mining interests are illegally active in the reserve.

== Subsistence ==
The Awa traditionally hunt, gather, fish, and cultivate plants. Today, they also farm livestock, such as chickens, ducks, guinea pigs, and pigs.

They practice a form of agriculture called "slash and mulch," which involves clearing small parcels of land (about 1.25 to 5 acres) and leaving the fallen plants and trees to decay. Within days, the vegetation turns to a layer of humus, favorable for planting. These parcels are cultivated for two or three seasons, then left fallow for periods of over seven years. They practice intercropping and grow many different varieties of manioc and plantains. They also grow corn, Colocasia, Xanthosoma, beans, sugarcane, hot peppers, chirimoya, tomato, tamarind, mango, achiote, borojo, naranjilla, papaya, inga, avocado, peach palm, and other useful plants. The trees outlive the annual plants and foster regrowth while the plots are left fallow.

Awa hunt game such as the Central American Agouti, paca, collared peccary, brocket deer, iguana, and several birds. Hunting is regulated on Awa land.

== Organizations ==
Flag of the Unity of Indigenous People Awa

Their main organization is called UNIPA, which stands for Unity of Indigenous People Awa. Another internal organization is CAMAWARI. Their main leaders are called Governors. Awa actively participate in local politics since 1993, when they elected the first mayor of the municipality of Ricaurte (Juan Legarda) and several municipal counsellors. Since that year, Awa people have continued to play an important role in the politics of the department of Nariño.

== Conflicts ==
There were several mass murders of Awá in 2009, perpetrated by members of both Revolutionary Armed Forces of Colombia (FARC) and the Colombian army.

On 11 February 2009, ten Awa members were killed by FARC guerrillas, who had accused them of working as informers for the Colombian army. On 4 February 2009, 17 Awá were killed, reportedly by the FARC. Then in August, 12 Awá (including 4 children), all thought to belong to a single family – were killed in the Indigenous reservation of Gran Rosario, reportedly by the Colombian Army.
