= 1985 in Colombia =

- Decades: 1960s; 1970s; 1980s; 1990s; 2000s
- See also: Other events of 1985; Timeline of Colombian history

Events of 1985 in Colombia.

== Incumbents ==
- President: Belisario Betancur (1982–1986).
- Vice President: N/A. (Note: The Office of the Vice President was officially abolished by the 1905 National Constituent Assembly on 28 March 1905, and it was only reinstituted after the ratification of the new 1991 Constitution and filled in the following presidential elections in 1994.)

== Events ==
=== Ongoing ===
- Colombian conflict.

=== January ===
- 9 January – The Battle of Yarumales ends.
- 23 January – Teleantioquia launches as a television programadora.

=== February ===
- 27 February – Colombia officially recognizes the Shawari Arab Democratic Republic.
- 28 February – The Inter-American Convention to Prevent and Punish Torture is signed.

=== March ===
- 28 March – Satena Airlines Fokker 28, a commercial flight from Bogotá to Florencia, crashes into a mountain near San Vicente de Caguan during a storm, killing all 40 people on board.

=== April ===
- 22 April – The Federal Government announces that it has asked its international bank creditors for a $1 billion loan.

=== May ===
- 28 May – The Patriotic Union is founded.

=== June ===
- 24 June – Guerillas ambush and kill 6 police officer in western Valle del Cauca, 9 others are injured along with 3 civilians.

=== July ===
- 24 July – A Colombian Air Force cargo plane that was acting as a commercial passenger plane during a pilot's strike crashes near Leticia during a rainstorm, killing the estimated 80 people who were on board.

=== August ===
- 11 August – Teleantioquia launches as a television channel, becoming the first regional channel in Colombia.
- 28 August – 19th of April Movement (M-19) leader Iván Marino Ospina is killed by the military.
- 29 August – The José María Córdova International Airport opens in Rionegro, Antioquia, near Medellín.

=== September ===
- 11 September – Armero tragedy: Volcanologists warn of activity from the Nevado del Ruiz volcano.

=== October ===
- 17 October – First leg of the 1985 Copa Libertadores finals.
- 22 October – Second leg of the 1985 Copa Libertadores finals.
- 24 October – Play-off of the 1985 Copa Libertadores finals.

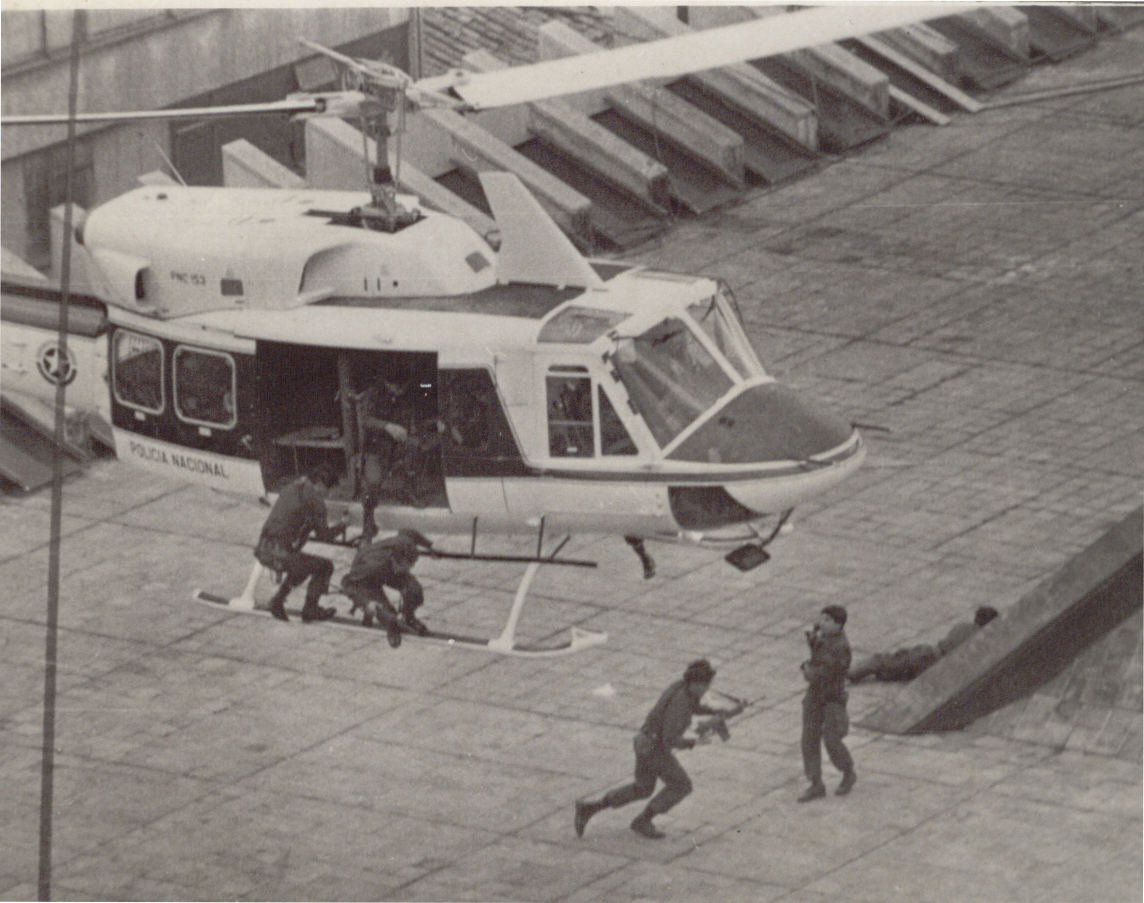
A Colombian Police Bell 212 deploying troops on the roof during the Palace of Justice siege

=== November ===
- 6–7 November – Palace of Justice siege: 98 people, 11 law enforcement personnel, 33 guerillas, and 43 civilians, are killed when M-19 Movement members take over the Palace of Justice and take 300 hostages, planning to hold a trial against president Betancur in retaliation for the killing of Iván Marino Ospina.The dead included 11 of the Supreme Court magistrates.
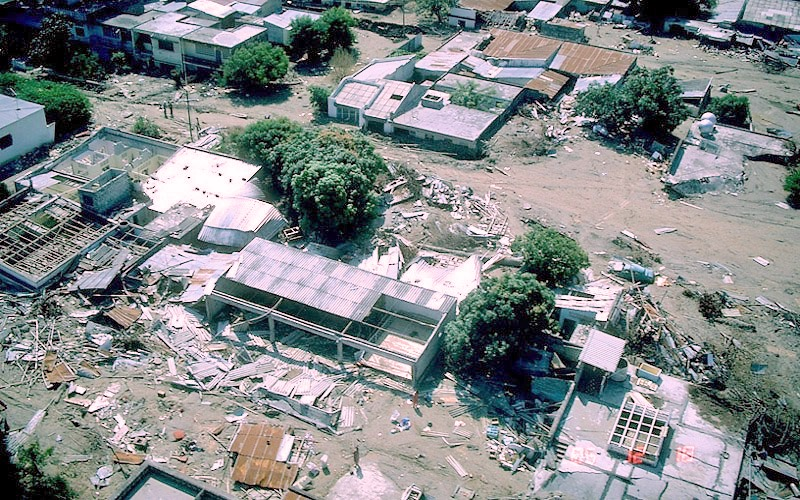
- Buildings destroyed by mudflows during the Armero tragedy
  13 November – Armero tragedy: The Nevado del Ruiz volcano erupts in the Tolima Department, causing mudflows, landslides, and debris flows to rip through the towns surrounding it. The town of Armero in particular is heavily affected. At least 23,000 people die, including 20,000 of the 29,000 residents of Armero. Property damage is assessed to be around one billion dollars, a fifth of Colombia's 1985 GDP. The disaster sparks outrage against the government for perceived mismanagement in the relief efforts and neglect leading up to the disaster.

=== December ===
- 9 December – The Roman Catholic Diocese of San Vicente del Caguán is established in San Vicente del Caguán, Caquetá.

== Births ==
- 9 July – Gustavo Dávila, footballer (d. 2014).
- 27 July – Juan Patiño, footballer.

== Deaths ==
- 23 July – Tulio Manuel Castro Gil, judge (b. 1943).
- 17 August – Luis Carlos González, poet and lyricist (b. 1908).
- 23 August – Carlos Correa, artist (b. 1912).
- 7 November:
  - Alfonso Reyes Echandía, then president of the Supreme Court of Colombia (b. 1932).
  - Alfonso Patiño Rosselli, jurist and diplomat (b. 1923).
  - Andrés Almarales, M-19 Movement leader (b. 1935).
  - Fanny González Franco, first female Supreme Court of Colombia justice and lawyer (b. 1934).
  - Luis Otero Cifuentes, politician and M-19 guerilla (b. 1943).
- 16 November – Omayra Sánchez, infamous Armero tragedy victim and subject of World Press Photo of the Year 1986 (b. 1972).
