= 1990 in Colombia =

- Decades: 1970s; 1980s; 1990s; 2000s; 2010s
- See also: Other events of 1990; Timeline of Colombian history

Events of 1990 in Colombia.

== Incumbents ==
- President:
  - Virgilio Barco Vargas (1986–7 August 1990).
  - César Gaviria (7 August 1990–1994).
- Vice President:
  - N/A. (Note: The Office of the Vice President was officially abolished by the 1905 National Constituent Assembly on 28 March 1905, and it was only reinstituted after the ratification of the new 1991 Constitution and filled in the following presidential elections in 1994.)

== Events ==
=== Ongoing ===
- Colombian conflict.
- Massacre of Trujillo.

=== January ===
- 14 January – Fidel Castaño orders the Los Tangueros paramilitary group to commit the Pueblo Bello Massacre. They loot houses, round up peasants in the town square, select 43 men and boys to kidnap, and torture them. Of the 43 kidnapped, 6 are murdered, and the 37 others are 'disappeared'.
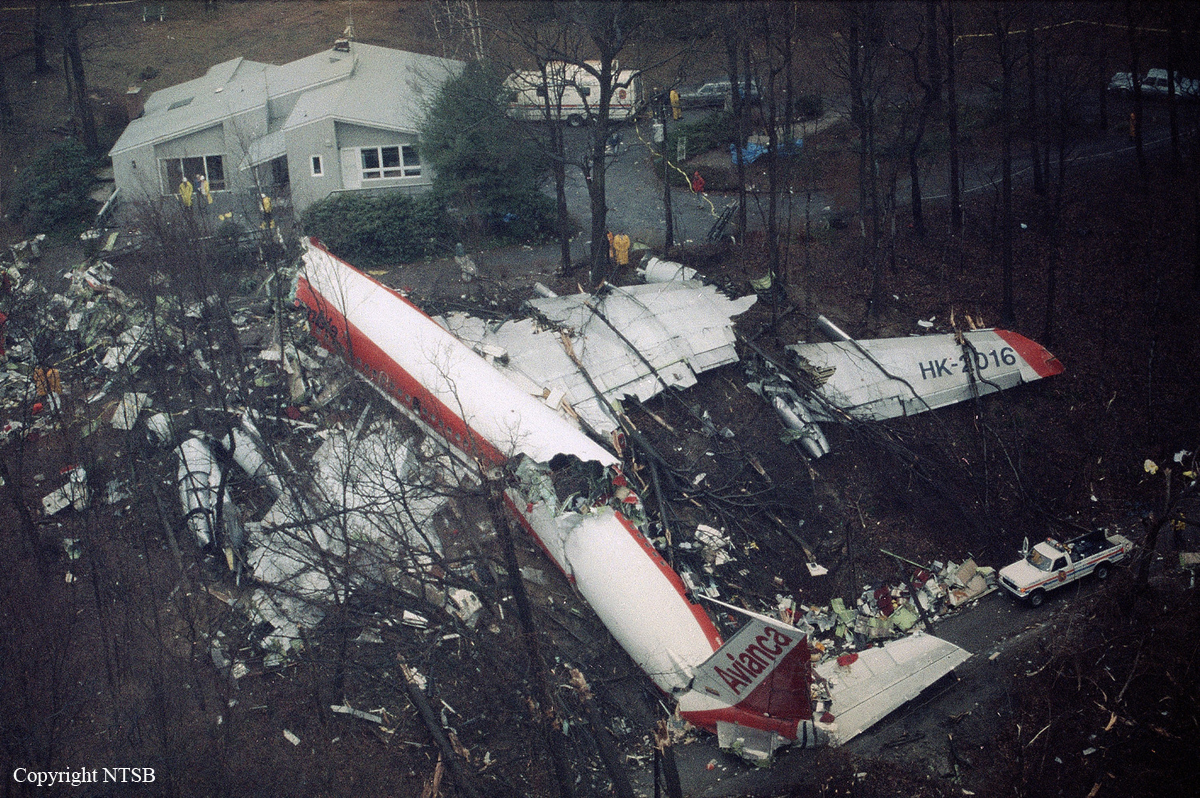
  Picture of the wreckage of Avianca Flight 052 in Cove Neck, New York.
- 25 January – Avianca Flight 052: 73 people die after an Avianca plane flying from Medellín to New York City, United States crashes in Cove Neck, New York.

=== February ===
- 15 February – U.S. president George H. W. Bush, president of Colombia Virgilio Barco, president of Peru Alan García, and president of Bolivia Jaime Paz Zamora attend a summit in Cartagena on combating drug trafficking.
- 26 February – Journalist Silvia Duzán is assassinated during the Third Cimitarra Massacre in Cimitarra, Santander alongside Josué Vargas, Miguel Ángel Barajas, and Saúl Castañeda.

=== March ===
- 11 March – 1990 Colombian parliamentary election.
- 22 March – Bernardo Jaramillo Ossa is assassinated.

=== April ===
- 26 April – Carlos Pizarro Leongómez is assassinated.

=== May ===
- 13 May:
  - Two car bombs explode in Bogotá, killing 19 people and injuring 143.
  - A car bomb explodes in Cali, killing 6 and injuring 25.
- 27 May:
  - 1990 Colombian presidential election
  - May 1990 Colombian Constitutional Assembly referendum

=== June ===
- 1 June – A formal complaint is filed by Americas Watch with Carla Hills, the US Trade Representative, questioning Colombia's eligibility for trade benefits under the Generalized System of Preferences on the basis of labor rights violations and unionist persecution.
- 23 June – Porto bar massacre.

=== July ===
- 13-15 July – 1990 South American Junior Championships in Athletics.
- 25 July – The first leg of the 1989 Copa Interamericana is held at Atanasio Girardot in Medellín. Colombia's Atlético Nacional beats México's UNAM 2 to 0.

=== August ===
- 1 August – The second leg of the 1989 Copa Interamericana is held at Olímpico Universitario Stadium in Mexico City, México. Colombia's Atlético Nacional beats México's UNAM 4 to 1.

=== September ===
- 19 September – Marina Montoya is kidnapped.
- 25 September – Los Cocos farm massacre: Armed men in military uniforms kill 26 people playing soccer at a ranch in Candelaria, Valle del Cauca.

=== October ===
- 12 October – Community leaders from the Aguablanca district of Cali Francisco Sapizábal, Luis Cuazquer, and Jorge Ocampo are “disappeared”. Their bodies are found, shot and tortured, in the Cauca river on the 16th.

=== November ===
- 11 November – Miss Colombia 1990 is held in Cartagena; Miss Atlántico Maribel Gutiérrez wins.

=== December ===
- 9 December – 1990 Colombian Constitutional Assembly election.

== Births ==
- 1 April – Juan Bravo, footballer.
- 9 June – Andrés Arroyave, footballer (d. 2018).

== Deaths ==
- 25 January – Diana Turbay, journalist (b. 1950).
- 26 February – Silvia Duzán, journalist (b. 1960).
- 27 February – Alberto Dow, writer (b. 1923).
- 22 March – Bernardo Jaramillo Ossa, politician (b. 1956).
- 26 April – Carlos Pizarro Leongómez, politician (b. 1952).
