= ATCC =

ATCC may refer to:

- American Type Culture Collection
- Asociación de Trabajadores Campesinos del Carare (Association of Peasant Workers of the Carare)
- Asian Touring Car Championship
- Air traffic control center
- Australian Touring Car Championship, the predecessor to the V8 Supercar Championship Series
- Ayutthaya Women's Volleyball Club A.T.C.C., Thailand
