= Avirama =

Avirama may refer to:

- The Avirama, indigenous people of Huila Department, Colombia, see "Gaitana"
- Avirama, 1956 ballet by Luis Antonio Escobar
- Avirama Golan – Israeli journalist, writer, and translator
- Marco Avirama, Colombian politician and indigenous leader, member of the Senate (2014–2018)
