= 1991 in Colombia =

- Decades: 1970s; 1980s; 1990s; 2000s; 2010s
- See also: Other events of 1991; Timeline of Colombian history

Events of 1991 in Colombia.

== Incumbents ==
- President: César Gaviria (1990–1994).
- Vice President: N/A. (Note: The Office of the Vice President was officially abolished by the 1905 National Constituent Assembly on 28 March 1905, and it was only reinstituted after the ratification of the new 1991 Constitution and filled in the following presidential elections in 1994.)

== Events ==
=== Ongoing ===
- Colombian conflict.
- Massacre of Trujillo.

=== January ===
- 15 January – The second-highest-ranking member of the Medellín Cartel, Jorge Luis Ochoa, surrenders to authorities.

=== February ===
- 16 February – Juan David Ochoa Vásquez of the Medellín Cartel surrenders to authorities.
- 22–23 February – Colombian Communist Party (PCC) member Rosalba Camacho and five of her family members are murdered in Montoso, Prado, Tolima. Two of her sons had also been killed in 1990.

=== March ===
- 1 March – The Popular Liberation Army (EPL) formally agrees to demobilize.
- 7 March – Members of the Revolutionary Armed Forces of Colombia (FARC) kill five National Policemen in El Retorno, Guaviare.

=== April ===
- 20 April – 1991 Categoría Primera B season.
- 30 April – Former Justice Minister Enrique Low Murtra is shot and killed.

=== May ===
- 30 May – In a communiqué, Pablo Escobar, of the Medellín Cartel, says that he hopes to surrender.

=== June ===
- 19 June – The Medellín Cartel's Pablo Escobar surrenders to authorities in Medellín and is flown to jail.
- 20 June – Financial chief of the Medellín Cartel, Valentin Jesus Taborda, surrenders.

=== July ===
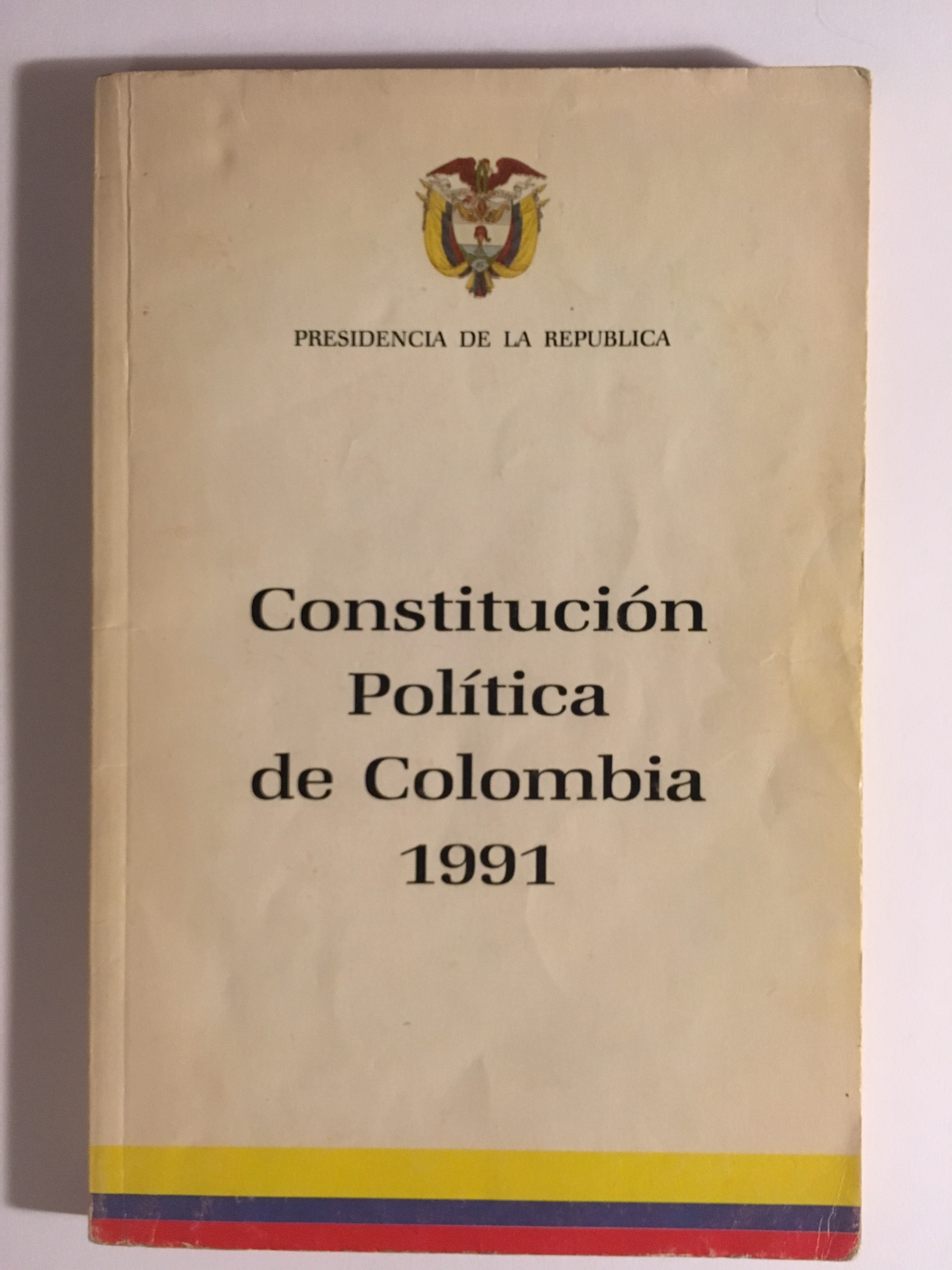
- Published copy of the 1991 Constitution
  4 July – The 1991 Colombian Constitution is promulgated. This results in the establishment of the:
  - Amazonas department
  - Putumayo department
  - Archipelago of San Andrés, Providencia, and Santa Catalina
  - current Senate
  - Ministry of Foreign Trade
  - Constitutional Court
  - Attorney General position and its Office
- 11 July – Solar eclipse of July 11, 1991

=== August ===
- 2–18 August – Colombia at the 1991 Pan American Games

=== September ===
- Miguel Maza Márquez is dismissed by President Gaviria from his position as Police General of the Administrative Department of Security (DAS).

=== October ===
- 27 October – 1991 Colombian parliamentary election.

=== November ===
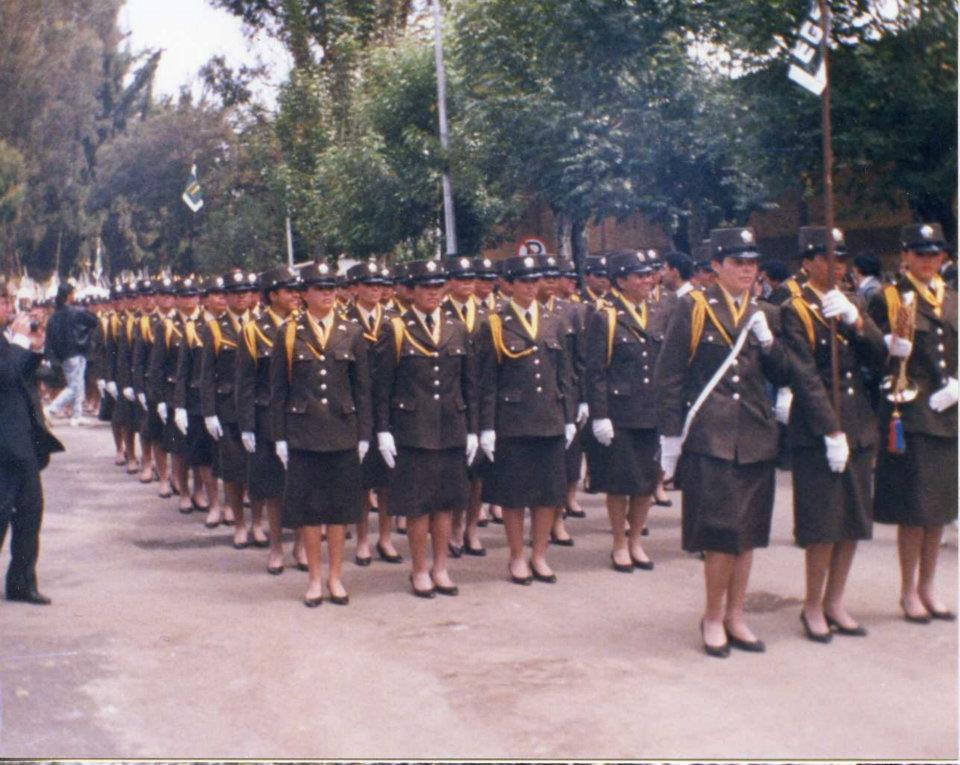
- A parade commemorating 100 years of the National Police
  5 November – The 100th anniversary of the founding of the National Police occurs, commemorations are held.
- 19 November – 1991 Chocó earthquake.

=== December ===
- 10 December – Alirio Pedraza, an attorney who investigated human rights abuses and had disappeared the year prior, is honored by Human Rights Watch “to commend [his] dedication to justice and to highlight [his] plight” as apart from their annual selection of human rights advocates.

=== Uncertain ===
- The first TVyNovelas Awards Colombia are held.

== Births ==
- 10 September – Andrés Mosquera, footballer.
- 27 November – Andrés Calle, politician.

== Deaths ==
- 5 February – José Manuel Rivas Sacconi, politician, former minister of foreign affairs (b. 1917).
- 22-23 February – Rosalba Camacho, Colombian Communist Party member.
- 30 April – Enrique Low Murtra, former Justice Minister.
