= 1941 in Colombia =

- Decades: 1920s; 1930s; 1940s; 1950s; 1960s
- See also: Other events of 1941; Timeline of Colombian history

Events in the year 1941 in Colombia.

== Incumbents ==
- President: Eduardo Santos

== Events ==
- March 16 – 1941 Colombian parliamentary election: The Liberal Party obtains a majority in the Chamber of Representatives.

== Births ==
- February 18 – Francisco Cristancho Hernández, musician and composer (d. 2023)
- March 28 – Jaime Pardo Leal, lawyer and politician (d. 1987)
- October – Ovidio Granados, accordionist (d. 2026)
