= Édgar Orlando Gaitán Camacho =

Colombian convicted serial rapist and false spiritual leader

- Born: 1958 (age 67–68); Carare-Opón, Magdalena Medio, Santander Department, Colombia
- Occupations: False spiritual leader, self-proclaimed *taita*
- Criminal charges: Sexual abuse, rape
- Criminal penalty: 14 years in prison (as of 2025)
- Criminal status: Incarcerated at La Tramacúa Prison, Valledupar, Colombia

Édgar Orlando Gaitán Camacho (born 1958) is a Colombian convicted serial rapist and former self-proclaimed "taita" (indigenous spiritual teacher). He falsely presented himself as an expert in Colombian plant medicine and shamanic traditions, using this fabricated identity to manipulate and sexually assault dozens of women and minors under the guise of traditional healing ceremonies, particularly involving the use of yagé (ayahuasca). His case has drawn international attention for its scale, the exploitation of spiritual traditions, and the controversial legal proceedings that followed.

== Early life and false identity ==
Gaitán Camacho was born in the Carare-Opón region of Magdalena Medio, Santander Department, Colombia. He spent his youth in the mountains of Carare, where he claimed to have learned traditional medicine from his grandmother, Salomé, whom he falsely described as one of the last full-blooded members of the Carare people, an indigenous group officially considered extinct since the 19th century.

Gaitán Camacho later presented himself as the "last indigenous Carare" and a master of *yagé*, despite having no recognized affiliation with any indigenous community. His false identity was reinforced when he briefly served as president of the Association of Peasant Workers of the Carare (ATCC), a group that received the Right Livelihood Award (often called the "Alternative Nobel Prize") in 1990 for their peace efforts. Gaitán Camacho misrepresented this collective honor as a personal achievement, further solidifying his fraudulent image as a spiritual authority.

== Criminal activity ==
Gaitán Camacho's crimes came to light in 2012, when a 17-year-old victim reported his sexual abuse during supposed healing rituals. Investigations revealed a pattern of systematic abuse spanning decades, with at least nine formal complaints from women, including four minors (ages 14 and 17). Colombian authorities estimate he may have assaulted up to 50 women, using sedatives in yagé ceremonies to render victims defenseless.

=== Modus operandi ===
Gaitán Camacho exploited his false spiritual authority to create an environment of psychological manipulation and power asymmetry. He convinced victims that sexual acts were part of "healing rituals" and used his fabricated indigenous identity to justify his actions. Investigations by the Colombian Attorney General’s Office and anthropological studies confirmed that his victims were in a state of psychological subordination, unable to resist or fully comprehend the abuse.

== Legal proceedings ==
Gaitán Camacho's legal case has been marked by controversy and multiple appeals:

- December 2019: Initially sentenced to 29 years in prison for sexual abuse of four women during ceremonies
- October 2020: The sentence was annulled due to procedural errors.
- January 2021: A new trial resulted in a 19-year sentence for three cases of sexual abuse.
- February 27, 2025: The Cundinamarca and Amazonas Superior Tribunal controversially reduced his sentence to 14 years, arguing that some victims could have resisted or voluntarily returned to ceremonies. This decision sparked widespread criticism for ignoring psychological coercion and revictimizing survivors, as it contradicted Colombian jurisprudence on sexual violence and the concept of "incapacity to resist".

Gaitán Camacho is currently serving his sentence in La Tramacúa Prison in Valledupar, Colombia. His victims and legal representatives have filed a cassation appeal with the Colombian Supreme Court, arguing that the court failed to adequately analyze the evidence and the systemic nature of his abuses.

== Public and legal reactions ==
The Right Livelihood Award Foundation publicly clarified that the 1990 award was given to the ATCC as a collective, not to Gaitán Camacho individually.

Legal experts and psychologists have criticized the 2025 sentence reduction for lacking a gender perspective and failing to recognize the non-physical coercion used by Gaitán Camacho. The case has become a symbol of the challenges in prosecuting sexual violence in Colombia, particularly when perpetrators exploit cultural or spiritual authority.

== Criminal convictions ==
Camacho is a convicted rapist. The criminal complaint process began in 2012 in the prosecutor's office of Villeta, Cundinamarca, Colombia; there are nine complaints of women for sexual abuse against the perpetrator Orlando Gaitan Camacho. Four of these complaints are made by minors (one of 14 and another of 17 years). All the denunciations are about sexual abuse exercised by Edgar Orlando Gaitán Camacho within healings in yagé ceremony and other spaces.

These complaints showed the perpetrator Orlando Gaitan Camacho, peasant man, farm administrator, a contractor providing services with the state, who posed as "alternative peace Nobel prize," "Taita de yagé" and self-called "last indigenous Carare" for placing the victims in an inability to resist and abuse them. The perpetrator Orlando Gaitán was in 2015 in Villeta prison (Cundinamarca) under insurance measure, he left in 2016 due to the expiration of terms.

At this time, the criminal process enters the second instance, and the announcement of the ruling was made by the judge who is handling the case in Guaduas Cundinamarca. Guilt was only ruled for three minors. All nine complaints are for the crime of "carnal access in person put in an inability to resist."

The Office of the Prosecutor already presented evidence and concepts from Colombian indigenous organizations who responded that Orlando Gaitán does not belong to any recognized community, likewise The Right Livelihood Award Foundation, the Swedish organization that annually awards the "Alternative Nobel Prize," clarified to the media. Communication that Orlando Gaitán, was never distinguished with this award. In the same way, expert reports on legal medicine were presented by each of the victims, where their vulnerability and defenselessness were shown.

This one is not the only case. So, for that reason the accusing agency ignited the alarms at the time in the media: "A cultural phenomenon called 'neochamanism' is being spread, managed by people who, supposedly, do spiritual cleansing", taking advantage of urban people who do not know the indigenous practices, they have hope of being cured and of finding answers to their existence ".

== Books ==
- The Path to Eternity. El Sendero de la Eternidad. Orlando Gaitán Camacho. Bogota Colombia 2010.

== See also ==
- Association of Peasant Workers of the Carare
- Right Livelihood Award
- Sexual violence in Colombia
- Yagé
