= 1995 in Colombia =

- Decades: 1970s; 1980s; 1990s; 2000s; 2010s
- See also: Other events of 1995; Timeline of Colombian history

Events in the year 1995 in Colombia.

== Incumbents ==
- President: Ernesto Samper Pizano (1994–1998).
- Vice President: Humberto De la Calle (1994–1997).

== Events ==
=== Ongoing ===
- Colombian conflict.
- Proceso 8000.

=== January ===
- 1 January – The G3 Free Trade Agreement between Colombia, México, and Venezuela goes into effect.
- 11 January – Intercontinental de Aviación Flight 256.

=== February ===
- 8 February – 1995 Choco earthquake.

=== June ===
- 23 June – The Pacific Ocean Games begins in Cali.

=== July ===
- 3 July – The Pacific Ocean Games ends in Cali. The 1995 event was the first and last Pacific Ocean Games.

=== August ===
- 13 August – Popular daily morning show host Jaime Garzón is shot and killed by two men on a motorcycle while on his way to work.
- 21 August – La Gabarra massacre.

=== November ===
- 30 November – The first section of Line A of the Medellín Metro between Niquía to Poblado is opened. This included:
  - Acevedo station
  - Bello station
  - Berrío Park station
  - Caribe station
  - Hospital station
  - Industriales station

=== December ===
- 20 December – American Airlines Flight 965 crashes on route to Cali, killing 155 of the 163 people on board.

=== Uncertain ===
- Old Providence McBean Lagoon National Natural Park is established.

== Births ==
- 22 February – Laura González, actress and model.
- 28 February – Nicole Regnier, footballer.
- 12 August – Martha Bayona, cyclist.

== Deaths ==
- 19 January – Patricia Teherán, vallenato singer (b. 1969)
- 25 March – Luis Enrique Martínez, musician and songwriter (b. 1922–3).
- 8 April – Tobías Enrique Pumarejo, songwriter (b. early 1900s)
- 13 August – Jaime Garzón, journalist and political satirist (b. 1960).
