= 1933 in Colombia =

- Decades: 1910s; 1920s; 1930s; 1940s; 1950s
- See also: Other events of 1933; Timeline of Colombian history

Events from the year 1933 in Colombia.

== Incumbents ==
- President: Enrique Olaya Herrera

== Events ==
- February 14 – unsuccessful attempt by Peruvian Air Force to bomb Colombian Navy, President Herrera breaks off diplomatic relations
- February 15 – Colombian forces attack Peruvian positions at Tarapaca, Amazonas
- May 14 – Colombian parliamentary election, 1933
- May 24 – end of the Colombia–Peru War
- August 27 – opening of Captain Germán Olano Moreno Air Base

=== Uncertain date ===
- Establishment of Captain Luis F. Gómez Niño Air Base

== Births ==
- September 14 – Lucy González, singer (d. 1994)

=== Uncertain date ===
- Dolores Salinas, singer and songwriter (d. 2011)
