= 1847 in Colombia =

- Decades: 1820s; 1830s; 1840s; 1850s; 1860s
- See also: Other events of 1847; Timeline of Colombian history

Events in the year 1847 in Colombia.

== Incumbents ==
- President: Tomás Cipriano de Mosquera

== Events ==
=== Unknown ===
- Diplomatic relations are established with Italy.
- Colombia Adopts The Decimal System.

== Births ==
- 20 July - Jose Maria Quijano Wallis (Died 1922)

== Deaths ==
=== Unknown ===
- Miguel Acuña, medical practitioner, (Born 1788)
