= 1993 in Colombia =

- Decades: 1970s; 1980s; 1990s; 2000s; 2010s
- See also: Other events of 1993; Timeline of Colombian history

Events in the year 1993 in Colombia.

== Incumbents ==
- President: César Gaviria (1990–1994).
- Vice President: N/A. (Note: The Office of the Vice President was officially abolished by the 1905 National Constituent Assembly on 28 March 1905, and it was only reinstituted after the ratification of the new 1991 Constitution and filled in the following presidential elections in 1994.)

== Events ==
=== Ongoing ===
- Colombian conflict.
- Massacre of Trujillo.

=== January ===
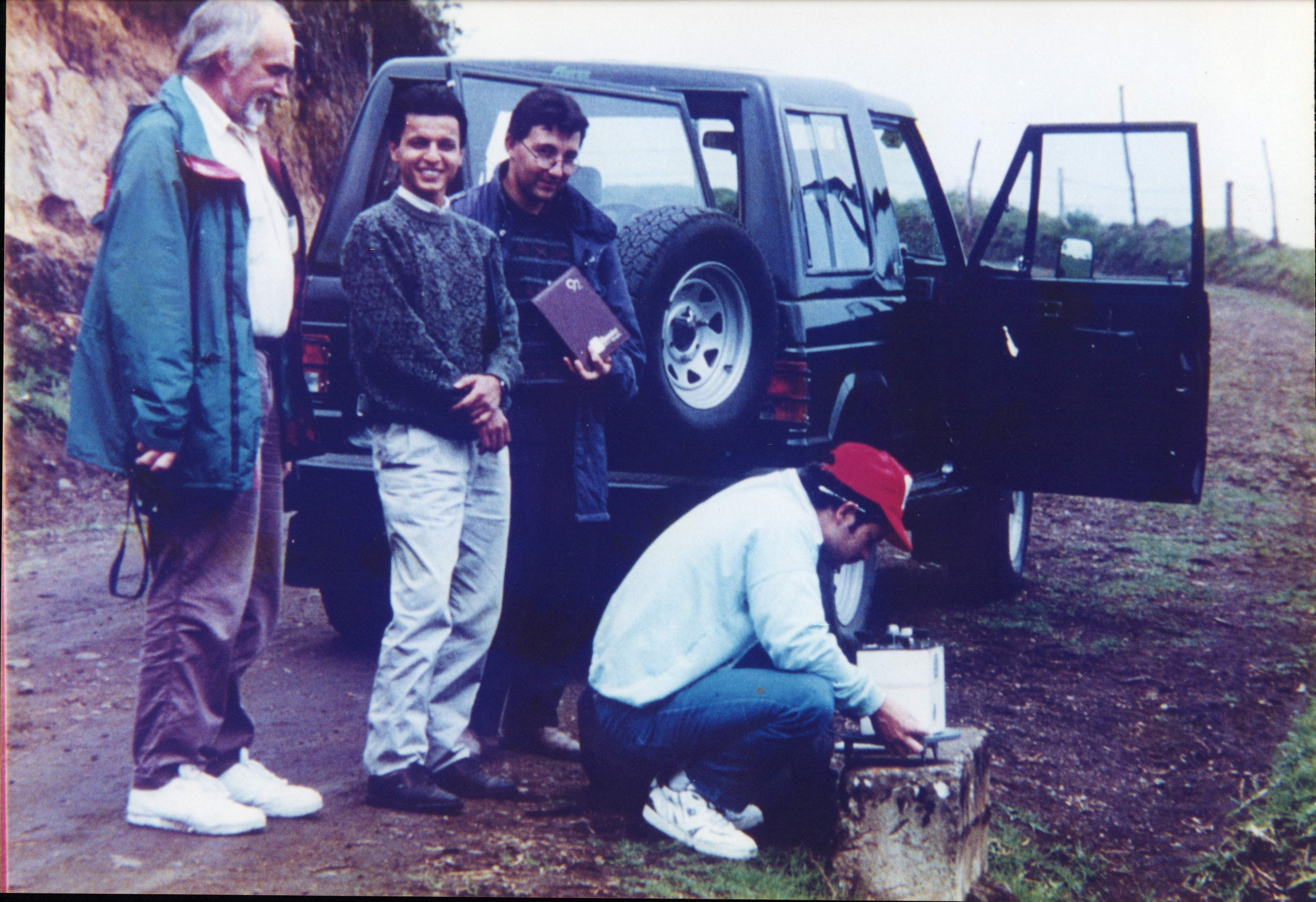
Volcanologist preparing at the Galeras stratovolcano on 14 January 1993, just hours before the eruption.

- 14 January – Galeras tragedy: The Galeras stratovolcano erupts, killing 6 volcanologists and 3 tourists.
- 30 January – 12 days after a letter was published by Pablo Escobar vowing to renew his all-out war on the Colombian state, the Medellín Cartel detonates a bomb in Bogotá, killing 25 and injuring 70.

=== February ===
- 11 February – 14 people are killed and 25 are injured in Barrancabermeja, Santander after a bomb goes off at an auto repair shop.

=== March ===
- 19 March – The Colombian Army carry out a road sweep in San Jose Del Guaviare, Guaviare and find a 50 lbs explosive buried in a road connecting a U.S. Navy construction site and the local airport. It was successfully defused by the army.

=== April ===
- 15 April – A car bomb is detonated in front of Bogotá's Centro 93 shopping mall by the Medellín Cartel, killing 8 and injuring 242. The blast destroys 100 commercial properties and causes damage valued at 1.5 Billion COP.

=== May ===
- 19 May – SAM Colombia Flight 501 crashes, killing 132 people.

=== June ===
- 22 June – Roison Mora Rubiano, a 16-year-old working in construction, is murdered by National Army members in Bogotá while walking home from work with his friends. He and his friends were throwing rocks when one hit a bus carrying National Army personnel. Two soldiers from the bus chased after Rubiano and his friends, eventually shooting at them and killing him.

=== July ===
- 1 July – Colombia's national football team plays Argentina's in the Copa América 1993 semi-finals at Estadio Monumental Isidro Romero Carbo in Guayaquil, Ecuador. No goals are scored, but a penalty shoot out ends Argentina 6–5 Colombia.

=== August ===
- 4–11 August – Tropical Storm Bret passes over northern coastal areas of Colombia, killing one person. The storm kills a total of 231 people across Colombia, Venezuela, Nicaragua, Honduras, and Costa Rica.

=== October ===
- 14 October –The Inter-American Commission on Human Rights releases its second report on the situation of Human Rights in Colombia.

=== November ===
- 5 November – Dario Londono Cardona, Vice President of the Senate, and his driver are shot by a group of hitmen in Medellín. This was days after a law he had written parts of, offering leniency to those charged with drug trafficking and other crimes who cooperated with officials, passed. The group “Death to Protectors of the Cali Cartel” claims responsibility. Cardona later dies of his injuries.

=== December ===
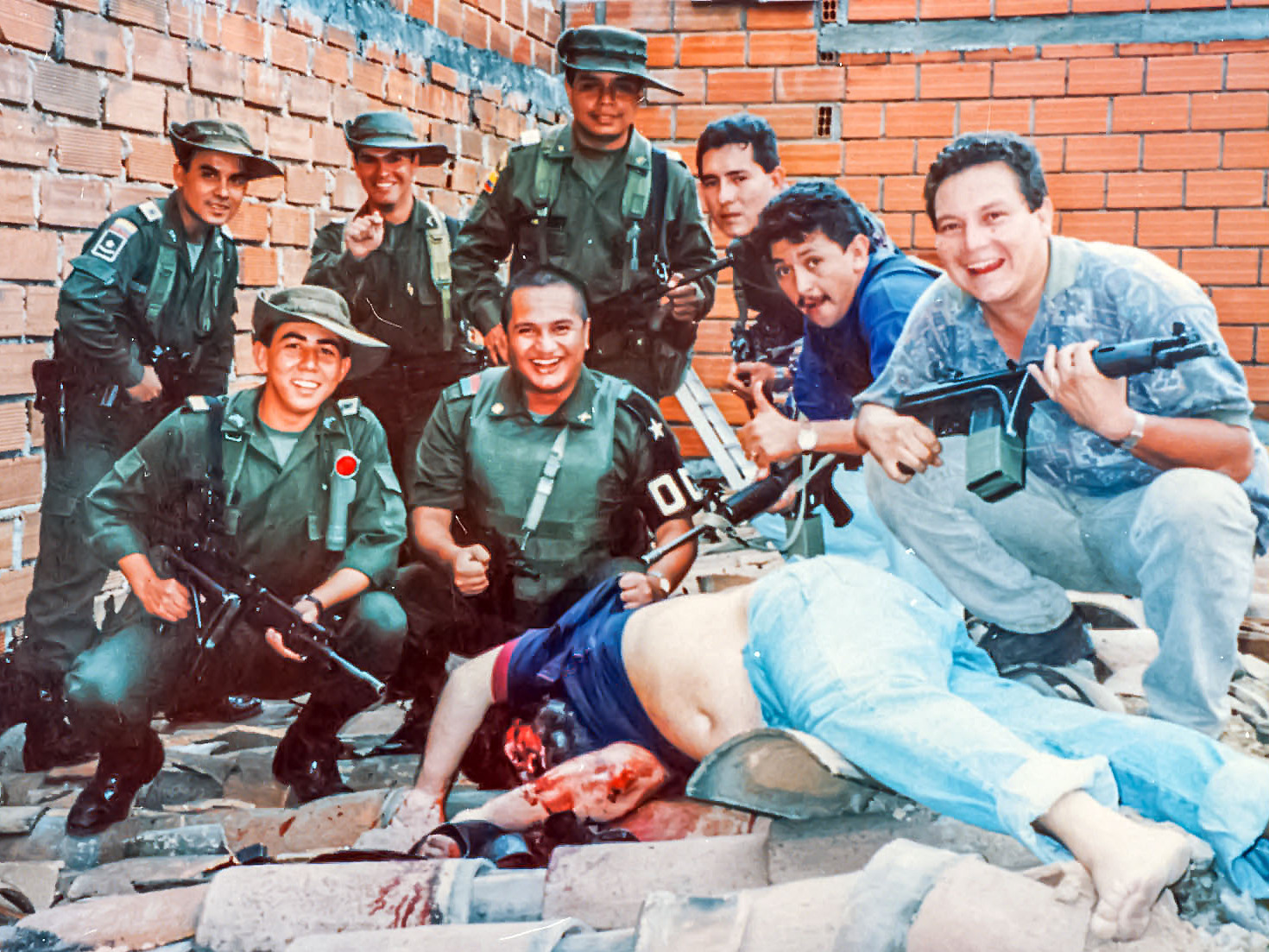
Members of Search Bloc pose over Pablo Escobar's body on 2 December 1993.

- 2 December – Death of Pablo Escobar: The infamous drug lord Pablo Escobar is killed in Medellín during a shoot-out with the National Army and local police.

== Births ==
- 15 January – Paulina Vega, model and actress (Miss Universe 2014).
- 18 January – Juan Fernando Quintero, footballer.
- 24 January – Kevin Ríos, track cyclist.
- 28 February – Éder Álvarez Balanta, footballer.
- 8 March – Kevin Roldán, singer.

== Deaths ==
- 28 January – Edmundo Arias, 67, bandleader, musician, and composer.
- 3 February – Omar Cañas, 23, footballer.
- 23 August – Irene Martínez, 69, bullerengue singer and songwriter.
- 11 September – Luis Antonio Escobar, 68, composer and musicologist.
- 15 September – Emilia Herrera, 61, bullerengue singer.
- 8 November – Francisco Zuluaga, 64, footballer.
- 25 November – Juan Carlos Castillo, 29, racing cyclist.
- 2 December – Pablo Escobar, 44, drug lord and narcoterrorist.
