= 1986 in Colombia =

- Decades: 1960s; 1970s; 1980s; 1990s; 2000s
- See also: Other events of 1986; Timeline of Colombian history

Events of 1986 in Colombia.

== Incumbents ==
- President:
  - Belisario Betancur (1982–1986)
  - Virgilio Barco Vargas (1986–1990)
- Vice President: N/A (Note: The Office of the Vice President was officially abolished by the 1905 National Constituent Assembly on 28 March 1905, and it was only reinstituted after the ratification of the new 1991 Constitution and filled in the following presidential elections in 1994.)

== Events ==
=== Ongoing ===
- Colombian conflict.
- Massacre of Trujillo.

=== January ===
- 19th of April Movement (M-19) guerillas ambush a National Army truck in Silvia, Cauca, killing several soldiers and taking three hostages. This triggers weeks long fighting in the department.

=== February ===
- Fighting continues in the Cauca Department.

=== March ===
- 9 March – The 1986 Colombian parliamentary election is held.
- 13 March – M-19 leader Álvaro Fayad is killed in a military operation.

=== May ===
- 25 May – The 1986 Colombian presidential election is held.

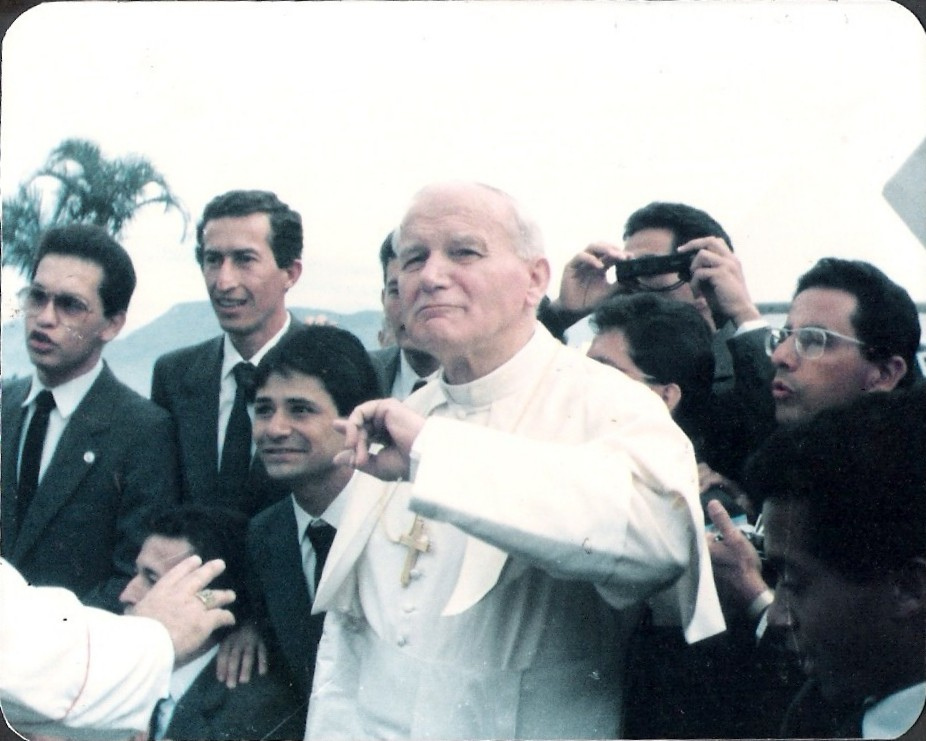
Saint John Paul II in Medellín (5 July 1986)

=== July ===
- 1-7 July – Saint John Paul II visits Colombia.

=== October ===
- 22 October – 1986 Copa Libertadores finals: The first leg of the finals between Argentine club River Plate and Colombian club América de Cali is held at the Pascual Guerrero Stadium in Cali. América de Cali looses 1-2.
- 29 October – 1986 Copa Libertadores finals: The second leg of the finals is held at the Estadio Monumental in Buenos Aires, Argentina. América de Cali looses 0-1.

=== November ===
- 16 November – Señorita Colombia 1986 is held.

=== December ===
- 17 December – Pablo Escobar's Medellín cartel murders El Espectador director and journalist Guillermo Cano Isaza. In the following 24 hours, the Colombian press at large protested his murder by not airing any radio or television news nor printing any print media.

=== Uncertain ===
- The Central Union of Workers is founded.
- The Children's Museum of Bogotá is founded.
- The Colegio Cristiano El-Shaddai is founded in Barranquilla.

== Births ==
- 28 January – Miguel Uribe Turbay, politician.
- 10 February – Radamel Falcao, footballer.
- 25 April – Juan Sebastián Cabal, tennis player.
- 30 September – Cristián Zapata, footballer.
- 18 December – Jery Sandoval, actress, model, and singer
- Víctor Hugo Moreno Mina, activist.

== Deaths ==
- 31 January – Clímaco Sarmiento, musician and songwriter (b. 1916).
- 13 March – Álvaro Fayad, M-19 guerilla leader (b. 1946).
- 2 April – Ramón Ropaín, pianist and bandleader (b.1916).
- 17 December – Guillermo Cano Isaza, journalist (b. 1925).

== See also ==
- Colombian withdrawal from the 1986 FIFA World Cup
