= La Ruana =

Song
- Genre: Bambuco
- Songwriters: José Macías and Luis Carlos González

"La Ruana" is a Colombian bambuco song written by José Macías and Luis Carlos González. It was popularized in a recording from the 1950s by Obdulio y Julián.

Viva Music Colombia rated the song No. 5 on its list of the 100 most important Colombian songs of all time. In its list of the 50 best Colombian songs of all time, El Tiempo, Colombia's most widely circulated newspaper, ranked the version of the song by Obdulio y Julián at No. 17.
