= El Tiple =

- Municipality and Town or Village
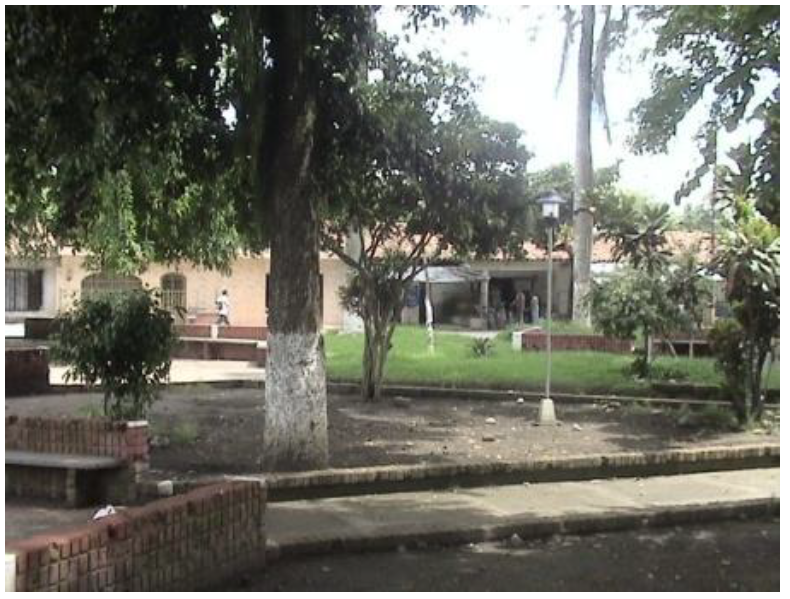
- Park of the Corregimiento del Tiple

- Location of the town of El Tiple, Valle del Cauca in the Valle del Cauca Department of Colombia

- Location in Colombia
- Coordinates: 3°21′1.78″N 76°26′0.1″W
- Department: Valle del Cauca Department

Area
  - Total: 0.0747 km^{2} (0.0288 sq mi)

Population (2018)
  - Total: 1,800
- Time zone: UTC-5 (Colombia Standard Time)

El Tiple is a village located in the municipality of Candelaria, department of Valle del Cauca in Colombia.

It is located in the southwestern part of the municipality of Candelaria. To the north, it borders the village of San Joaquín; on the south, with the municipality of Puerto Tejada (Cauca), on the east, with the villages of Buchitolo and Cabuyal; and for the west, with the municipality of Cali, whose natural limit is the Cauca River. Its relief is completely flat, on the fertile valley of the Cauca river.

90% of its population belongs to the Afro-descendant ethnic community. Many people from this village work for the sugarcane mills of Valle del Cauca.

This ethnic community has been strongly impacted by the environmental liabilities generated by the sugarcane agroindustry.

== History of Tiple ==
El Tiple, formerly called "Amor Chiquito" (Little Love) was colonized in the late 1800s. The first inhabitants were located in what is known today as Tiple Abajo. Great families coming from Jamundí, families that until today are conserved as the Saldañas and Los Valencias. Very organized clans, conservative and enclosed in their customs. This made them the only family groups that have kept up to the present day, not only their lands, but also their beliefs, their customs and, above all, their family unity.
