= María Jimena Duzán =

Colombian journalist and political scientist

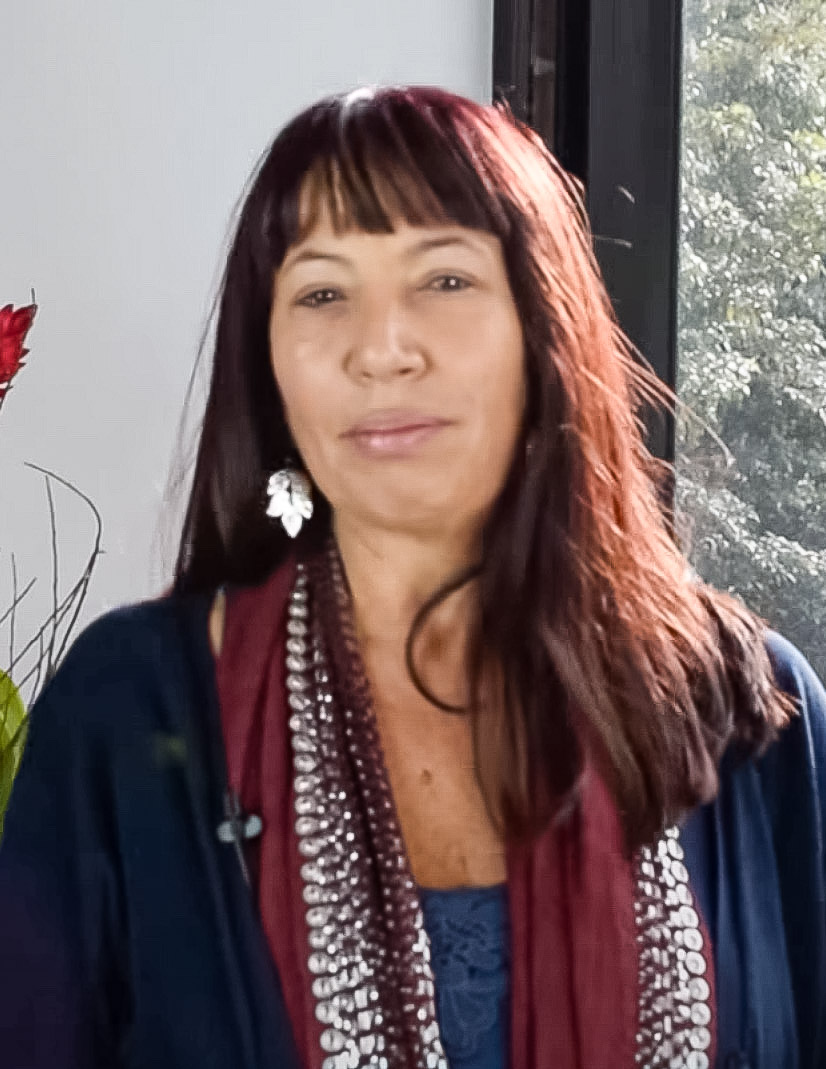
María Jimena Duzán in 2015

María Jimena Duzán Sáenz (born 1959) is a Colombian journalist and political scientist. She has worked for some of the most important media outlets in the country, including El Espectador, El Tiempo, and the magazine Semana, where she was employed from 2008 to 2020. From 2020 to 2021, she was a host on Caracol Radio's La W. She has also written for international publications. She is known for her criticism of the Álvaro Uribe government (2002–2010).

== Biography ==
María Jimena Duzán was born in Bogotá, Colombia, in 1959. She began writing at age 16, when she wrote a tribute to her deceased father, newspaper columnist Lucio Duzán, and submitted it to the then-director of El Espectador, Guillermo Cano. Cano published the piece and gave her a column in the paper titled "Mi hora cero" ("My Zero Hour"), making her one of the country's youngest columnists. Duzán went on to study political science at the University of the Andes and in Paris, where she also worked as a foreign correspondent.

She kept working for El Espectador, reporting for its investigations team and continuing to write her opinion column. Her mention Guillermo Cano was assassinated in 1986, apparently in connection with his investigations into drug trafficking gangs, and Duzán received death threats in response to her columns. In 1989, El Espectador was the target of a terrorist attack by one of the drug gangs. The following year, her sister, fellow journalist Silvia Duzán, was assassinated at age 30 in Cimitarra, along with three others, by a paramilitary group. She had been covering political violence in the Middle Magdalena Valley for the BBC. Later that year, María Jimena Duzán was given a Courage Award from the International Women's Media Foundation, which she dedicated to her sister and others who have given their lives for democracy. In 1994, she published the book Death Beat: A Colombian Journalist's Life Inside the Cocaine Wars, in which she recollects her days as a reporter for El Espectador, and in 2010 she more directly addressed her sister's death in the book Mi viaje al infierno.

Back at the University of the Andes, Duzán founded the country's first postgraduate journalism degree, which she oversaw for five years. In this period, she was chosen for a Nieman Fellowship at Harvard University. She wrote for various international publications including the Wall Street Journal, Newsday, and Marie Claire. For three years, she worked as a Colombian consul in Barcelona.

From 1992 to 1993, Duzán wrote for the magazine Semana, then later as a columnist for the newspaper El Tiempo, before returning to Semana in 2008. In her later stint at Semana, which lasted until 2020, she contributed as both a reporter and a columnist, and hosted the weekly program Semana en Vivo. In this period she was notably critical of Álvaro Uribe's presidency, publishing the critical book Así gobierna Uribe in 2004. After the magazine was acquired by the Gillinsky Group and its editorial direction changed significantly, Duzán quit alongside many of her colleagues. From 2020 to 2021, she worked for the morning news program on Caracol Radio's La W. Then, in 2021, she began pursuing independent projects, including a podcast A Fondo on Spotify. In 2022, she became a columnist for the magazine Cambio.

In 2005, Duzán received a Simón Bolívar National Journalism Award for journalist of the year.
