= 1988 in Colombia =

- Decades: 1960s; 1970s; 1980s; 1990s; 2000s
- See also: Other events of 1988; Timeline of Colombian history

Events of 1988 in Colombia.

== Incumbents ==
- President: Virgilio Barco Vargas (1986–1990).
- Vice President: N/A. (Note: The Office of the Vice President was officially abolished by the 1905 National Constituent Assembly on 28 March 1905, and it was only reinstituted after the ratification of the new 1991 Constitution and filled in the following presidential elections in 1994.)

== Events ==
=== Ongoing ===
- Colombian conflict.
- Massacre of Trujillo

=== January ===
- 15 January – Union leader Manuel Gustavo Chacón is assassinated in Barrancabermeja, Santander.
- 25 January – While on his way to José María Córdova International Airport, Inspector General Carlos Mauro Hoyos is attacked and kidnapped. He is killed in captivity a few hours after.

=== February ===
- 22 February – 17 citizens of the town of Piñalito, near Vista Hermosa, Meta, are killed by armed men, including children.

=== March ===
- 4 March – Honduras and La Negra farm massacre: 20 ex-guerrillas recruited by the Colombian Army's Voltíjeros battalion attack the Honduras farm in Currulao, Antioquia and kill 17 of its workers. The same men then travel to the nearby La Negra farm and kill 3 of its workers.
- 17 March – Avianca Flight 410 crashes in Cúcuta, killing all 143 people on board.

=== April ===
- 3 April – La Mejor Esquina massacre: 27 people are killed in La Mejor Esquina, Buenavista, Córdoba by Los Magníficos, a right-wing paramilitary commanded by Fidel Castaño.

=== May ===
- 29 May – Álvaro Gómez Hurtado is kidnapped by M-19 guerillas.

=== June ===
- 8-19 June – The Vuelta a Colombia 1988 is held.

=== July ===
- 20 July – Álvaro Gómez Hurtado is released.

=== August ===
- 30 August – El Tomate massacre.

=== September ===
- 17-18 September – The Concert of Concerts is held in the Estadio El Campín in Bogotá.

=== October ===
- 10 October – Hurricane Joan–Miriam forms.

=== November ===
- 11 November – Segovia massacre.

=== December ===
- 14 December – The University of the Pacific is founded.

== Births ==
- 26 May – Juan Cuadrado, footballer.

== Deaths ==
- 25 January – Carlos Mauro Hoyos, jurist and politician (b. 1939).
- 21 July – Pacho Galán, musician (b. 1906).
- 4 August – Ofelia Uribe de Acosta, suffragist (b. 1900).
