= Gimnasio Campestre =

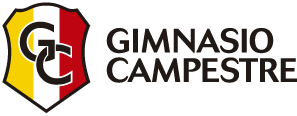

Location
- Calle 165 No 8 A 50. Bogotá, Colombia; Colombia; 4.742728°N 74.027295°W

Information
- Type: Private
- Established: 1946
- Principal: Ignacio Osuna
- Colors: Yellow, white and red
- Athletics: Association football, hockey, basketball, volleyball, track and field, table tennis, military band
- Website: www.campestre.edu.co

The Gimnasio Campestre is an all-male, elite-traditional Pre-K to 11th grade private school in Bogotá, Colombia.

== Origin ==
It was founded in 1946 by Alfonso Casas Morales, and its educational legacy has prepared several generations of "gimnasianos", as its alumni are known, offering them an education that has stressed the school motto, to "be men of honor". In 1987, after the passing of Mr. Casas, who served also as Principal and Director of the school since its creation, the board of directors chose Mr. Jorge Bernardo Londoño as his successor.

== Expansion ==
Continuing with Mr Casas' legacy, and preparing the school for the 21st century, Mr. Londoño began the modernization of the facilities, building a multi-court/ multi-purpose sports center, which also doubles as a concert hall.

It was during this period that the traditional field trips for high-school seniors were extended to week-long excursions for every class, from 1st to 11th grade, to diverse destinations in Colombia and abroad.

Mr. Londoño was succeeded by Dr. Jaime Bernal, a medical geneticist, who due to his profession and his interest in scientific discovery, re-directed the modernization process to include an observatory (a participant of NASA's Radio Jove Project), and the most modern Molecular biology Lab of any secondary education institution in the country.

Students receive half of their classes in English and learn French as a third language. Since 2016, the school is internationally accredited by two highly known accreditation agencies: New England Association of Schools and Colleges (NEASC) and Council of International Schools (CIS).

== Merger ==
In February 2026, Gimnasio Campestre announced plans to merge with the all-girls Marymount Bogotá to establish a new coeducational school named Gimnasio Marymount Campestre. The phased merger was scheduled to begin in August 2026, leading to full consolidation as a single institution by August 2029. Juan Antonio Casas Pardo, former principal of Gimnasio Campestre, was appointed general director of the new institution. In September 2026, the institution was renamed Gimnasio Campestre Marymount, accompanied by the unveiling of its new uniforms and visual identity.

== Accomplishments ==
The Gimnasio Campestre has a long tradition in Bogotá's history, where many graduates have become influential figures both at the local and at the national level. The school recently obtained an international certification by the Bureau Veritas for adhering to international teaching standards.

Among the extracurricular activities promoted by the school are a citywide known military band, a Boy Scout troop, a student-run radio station, and a media room broadcasting school events in closed-circuit television, as well as prominent intramural and extramural sports teams.

Two traditional yearly events include the "Copa Tradición" and the "Batuta de Plata", the former a soccer match with the arch-rival team of the Gimnasio Moderno, the latter a marching band competition with prominent local school bands.

Gimnasio Moderno and Gimnasio Campestre have maintained a decades-long rivalry in sports and other events, alongside ongoing inter-school academic and ethical relationships.

After the successful reforms in which Mr. Londoño and Mr. Bernal committed, Juan Antonio Casas Pardo, son of Alfonso Casas, was appointed to continue with the school's legacy.

== Headmasters ==
- Alfonso Casas Morales (1945–1987).
- Jorge Bernardo Londoño (1987–1997).
- Jaime Eduardo Bernal Villegas (1998–2006).
- Juan Antonio Casas Pardo (2006–2017).
- Alejandro Noguera Cepeda (2017–2023).
- Ignacio Osuna Soto (2023-Now).

== Community impact ==
Students are highly involved with the neighboring communities, and the school recently inaugurated a public library featuring over 3000 titles available to low-income students of public schools. Gimnasianos also volunteer many hours of community service and every Friday donate groceries and non-perishable items to be distributed among low income families of nearby neighborhoods.

Its Alumni Association] has maintained a network of former students that expands over five decades and several generations, providing services such as a job bank and a bi-monthly newsletter that help reinforce the bonds created by classmates and their families during the thirteen years of shared experiences at the school.

Today, the Gimnasio Campestre's headmaster is ex-student, Mr. Ignasio Osuna, who assumed his position in 2023, when past headmaster Alejandro Noguera left the school to work in the CESA university.

The school's guiding motto is "Have your country in your heart and the world in your head." The school is a member of Round Square, an international network of schools with a commitment to internationalism and community service.

== Military band ==
In 1954, the school hired a former army sergeant to start a military band.

The school's military band participates every year in the "Batuta de Plata" contest. It has won the contest four times (2002, 2005, 2014 & 2025), obtaining in each of these the highest awards given by the jury; the best band leader (2002, 2005 and 2023).

== Alumni ==
- Enrique Low Murtra – Minister of Justice during Virgilio Barco's presidency
- Alberto Carrasquilla – former Minister of Finance
- Enrique Peñalosa – Mayor of Bogotá
- Fonseca (singer) – Singer
- José Manuel Restrepo Abondano – current Vice President of Colombia and former Minister of Finance and Public Credit and Minister of Commerce, Industry and Tourism of Colombia
- David Luna - former Minister of information technologies and communications of Colombia

== Images ==
- School's Church
- Founder's Tomb
- School Building
- Courtyard
- Administrative Offices
