= Cueva del Nitro =

Cave system in Colombia

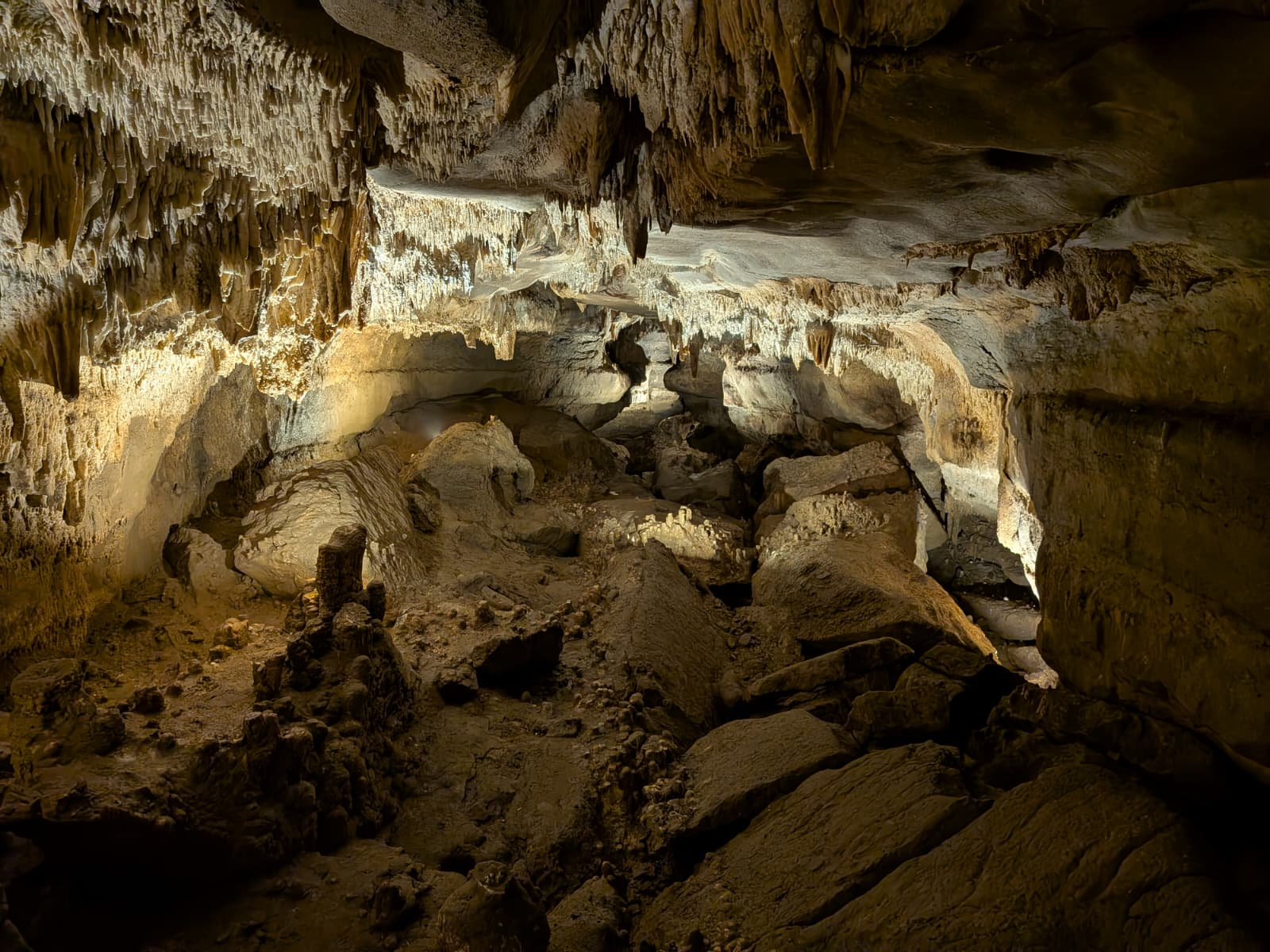
Interior of La Cueva del Nitro, Zapatoca, showing speleothems illuminated by the segment-based lighting system installed in 2023.

Cueva del Nitro is a limestone cave system located 6 kilometers (4 miles) from Zapatoca, Colombia, in the area of vereda Agua Fría.

The cave is an example of karst geology, meaning the landscape was formed by water dissolving the bedrock over millions of years. This process created the cave's jagged tunnels and large chambers. Geologically, the cave belongs to the Rosablanca Formation and dates back to the Early Cretaceous period (approximately 125 million years ago).

Visitors can access the cave via a guided route. Inside, the system features active underground water currents and extensive mineral formations, including stalactites (hanging from the ceiling), stalagmites (growing from the ground), columns, and flowstone.

== Discovery ==
The exact date of the cave’s initial discovery is not documented in available academic or institutional sources. However, La Cueva del Nitro was already known and visited by the mid-20th century. One of the earliest documented references is a 1965 excursion, recorded through five photographs by Colombian photographer Carlos Eslava and a written account by Jorge Valderrama, preserved in the digital collections of the Banco de la República.

=== Tourism ===
Access to La Cueva del Nitro is restricted to guided visits. Independent entry is not permitted. The guided route is completed entirely on foot, takes approximately 1 to 1.5 hours under normal conditions and requires the use of protective equipment such as helmets.

Operational details such as ticket prices, schedules, and visitor restrictions are managed locally and published through a website.

== Scientific significance ==
La Cueva del Nitro is the type locality of Trichomycterus zapatocaensis, a cave-adapted catfish species formally described in 2023. The species exhibits troglobitic characteristics such as reduced pigmentation and vision, consistent with life in subterranean environments.

Following seismic activity in the region, the Servicio Geológico Colombiano (SGC) conducted a technical inspection of the cave to identify hazards and risk zones. The visit documented areas requiring controlled access and reinforced the need for guided visitation.

=== Conservation ===
Academic studies and media reports have documented environmental impacts inside the cave resulting from long-term visitation, including vandalism, damaged geological formations, and waste accumulation.

In response, local authorities and partner organizations implemented conservation and visitor-management measures. A significant update occurred in 2023, when a segment-based lighting system was installed inside the cave. The system illuminates only the section of the route currently in use, with the stated objective of reducing environmental disturbance while improving visibility for guided visits.

The lighting project was developed as part of the international program Entre los Alpes y los Andes, led by the Universidad Autónoma de Bucaramanga (UNAB). According to UNAB, the initiative involved collaboration with the French non-governmental organization Tétraktys and the local cave operator, and was supported by a €25,000 donation from the Électricité de France (EDF) Foundation. The university described the project as an effort to align cave tourism in Zapatoca with environmental conservation standards.
