= Zapatoca =

Coordinates: 6°49′N 73°16′W

- Municipality and town
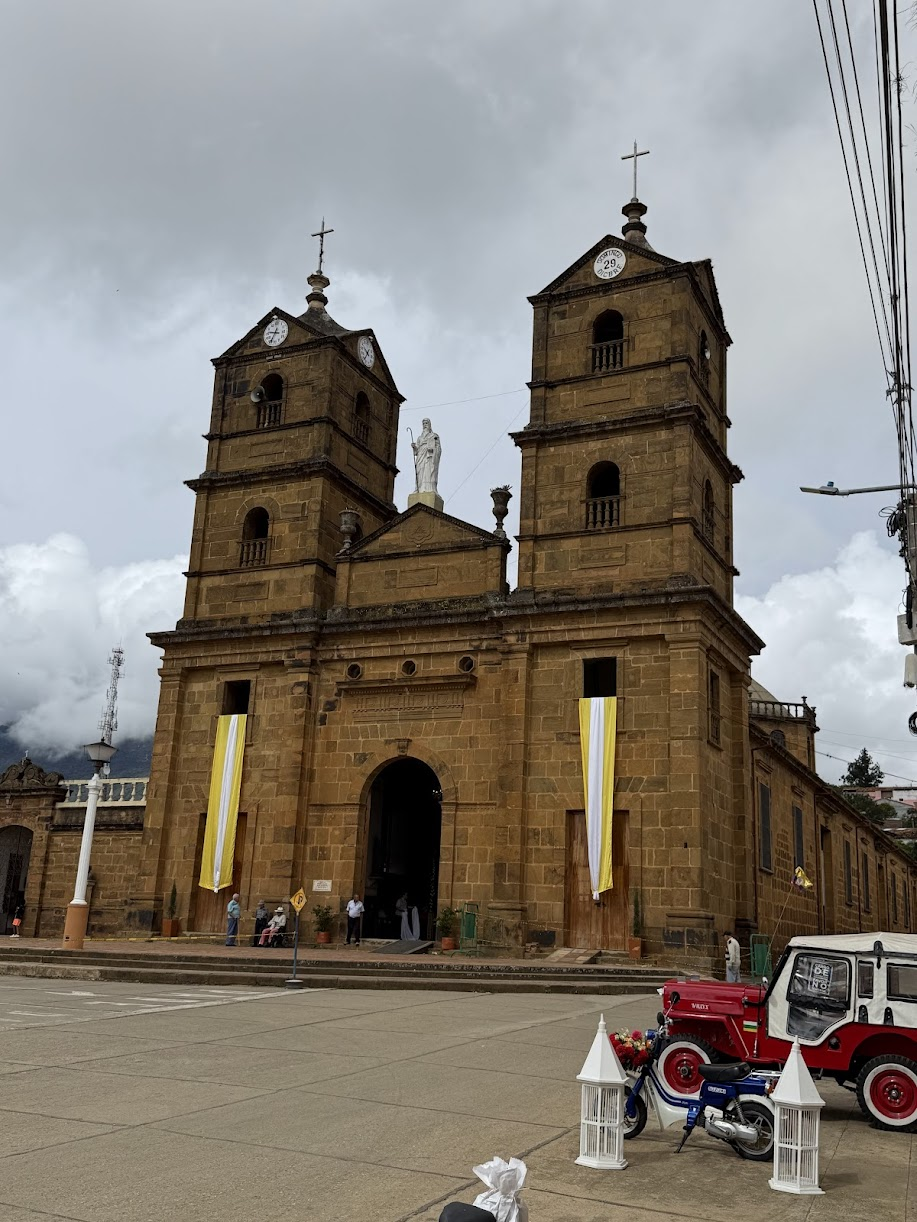

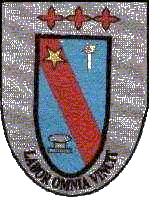
- Flag Coat of arms
- Nickname: Ciudad Levitica (Levitical City)
- Motto: Libertad y Orden (Liberty and Order)
- Location of the municipality and town of Zapatoca in the Santander Department of Colombia
- Country: Colombia
- Department: Santander Department
- Established: 1682

Area
  - Total: 360 km^{2} (140 sq mi)
- Elevation: 1,720 m (5,640 ft)

Population
  - Total: 8,929
- Time zone: UTC-5 (Colombia Standard Time)
- Website: www.zapatoca-santander.gov.co

Zapatoca (Spanish pronunciation: [sapaˈtoka]) is a town and municipality in the Santander Department in northeastern Colombia. It is at a high altitude and is a common stop between Bucaramanga and San Gil. It was built in the early 17th century by the Spanish conquistadores.

== Climate ==
Climate data for Zapatoca, elevation 1,810 m (5,940 ft), (1981–2010)
Month	Jan	Feb	Mar	Apr	May	Jun	Jul	Aug	Sep	Oct	Nov	Dec	Year
Mean daily maximum °C (°F)	23.5 (74.3)	23.9 (75.0)	23.8 (74.8)	23.6 (74.5)	23.5 (74.3)	23.4 (74.1)	23.4 (74.1)	23.7 (74.7)	23.5 (74.3)	22.8 (73.0)	22.6 (72.7)	22.8 (73.0)	23.4 (74.1)
Daily mean °C (°F)	18.6 (65.5)	18.8 (65.8)	18.9 (66.0)	19.0 (66.2)	19.0 (66.2)	18.9 (66.0)	18.8 (65.8)	18.9 (66.0)	18.8 (65.8)	18.4 (65.1)	18.4 (65.1)	18.4 (65.1)	18.7 (65.7)
Mean daily minimum °C (°F)	13.9 (57.0)	14.1 (57.4)	14.4 (57.9)	14.7 (58.5)	14.8 (58.6)	14.5 (58.1)	14.1 (57.4)	14.1 (57.4)	14.1 (57.4)	14.2 (57.6)	14.3 (57.7)	14.0 (57.2)	14.3 (57.7)
Average precipitation mm (inches)	30.9 (1.22)	38.6 (1.52)	74.5 (2.93)	129.0 (5.08)	162.0 (6.38)	109.0 (4.29)	100.0 (3.94)	119.4 (4.70)	157.1 (6.19)	175.3 (6.90)	111.4 (4.39)	48.9 (1.93)	1,256.1 (49.45)
Average precipitation days	7	8	11	16	19	16	16	18	19	20	16	9	169
Average relative humidity (%)	86	85	86	87	88	87	86	87	87	89	89	88	87
Mean monthly sunshine hours	201.5	169.4	167.4	135.0	142.6	117.0	173.6	182.9	162.0	145.7	144.0	176.7	1,917.8
Mean daily sunshine hours	6.5	6.0	5.4	4.5	4.6	3.9	5.6	5.9	5.4	4.7	4.8	5.7	5.3
Source: Instituto de Hidrologia Meteorologia y Estudios Ambientales

== Notable people ==
- Miguel Acuña (1788-1847), Franciscan priest and medical practitioner
- José de Jesús Pimiento Rodríguez (1919 - 2019 in Floridablanca) was a Prelate of the Catholic Church. Until his death the age of 100 he was the oldest living cardinal.
- Carlos Toledo Plata (1932 - 1984 in Bucaramanga) was a doctor, politician and co-founder and early leader of the guerrilla movement known as M-19.

== Points of interest ==
Iglesia de San Joaquín, the main parish church of Zapatoca, Santander, Colombia. Founded in 1743, the stone-built church features twin towers and serves as a central place of worship under the Diocese of Socorro y San Gil.

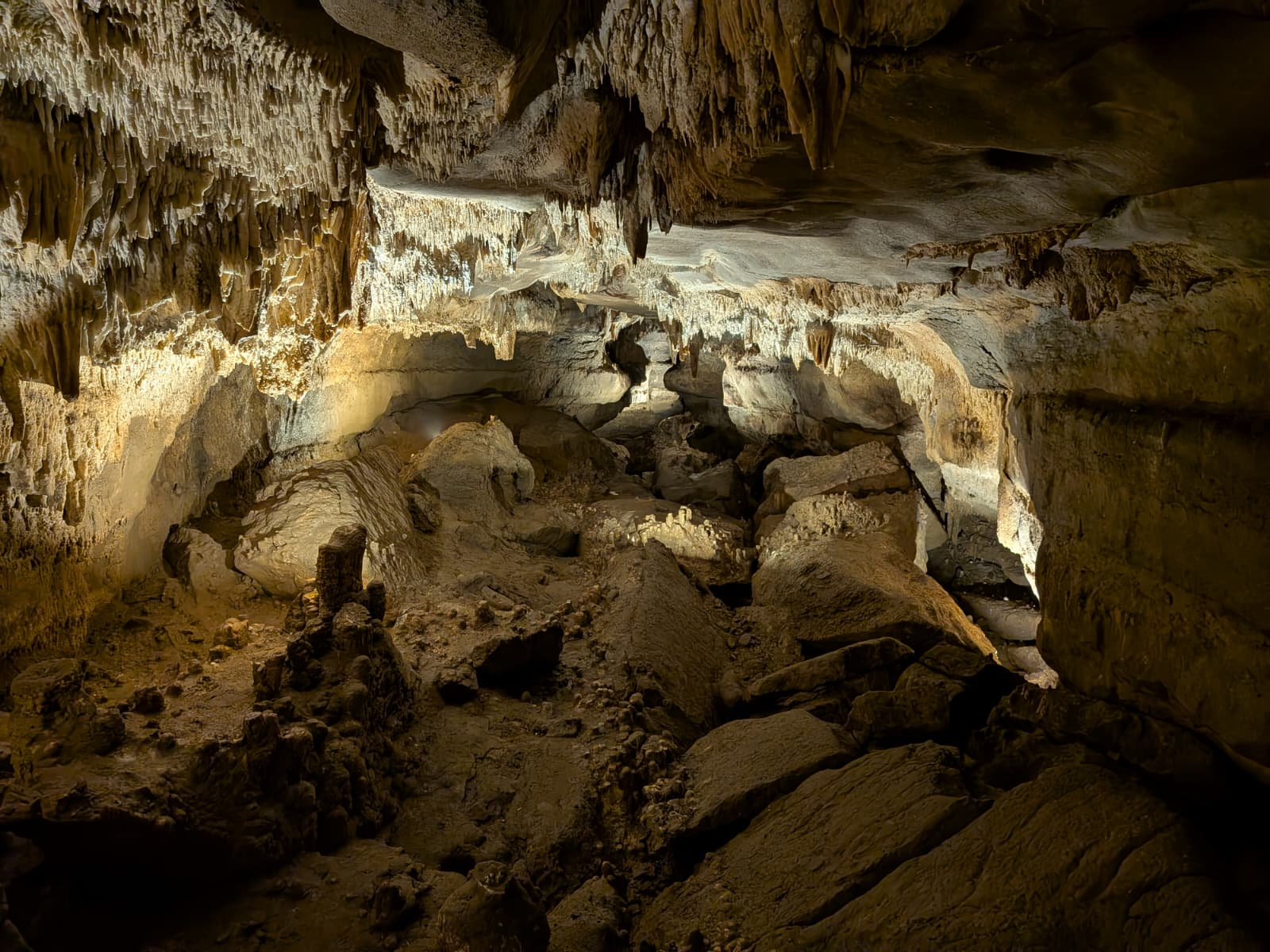
Interior of La Cueva del Nitro, Zapatoca, showing speleothems illuminated by the segment-based lighting system installed in 2023.

Zapatoca is near several natural attractions, including la Cueva del Nitro, a limestone cave system located approximately 6 kilometers (4 miles) from the town. The cave, formed by karst processes in Early Cretaceous rock, features extensive mineral formations such as stalactites and stalagmites, and is accessed via guided tours.

In January 2026, Zapatoca is scheduled to host the 42nd Ferias y Fiestas de la Cordialidad y el Retorno, an annual cultural festival traditionally held to welcome returning residents and visitors. The event is planned to take place from 9 to 12 January 2026.

== Paleontology ==
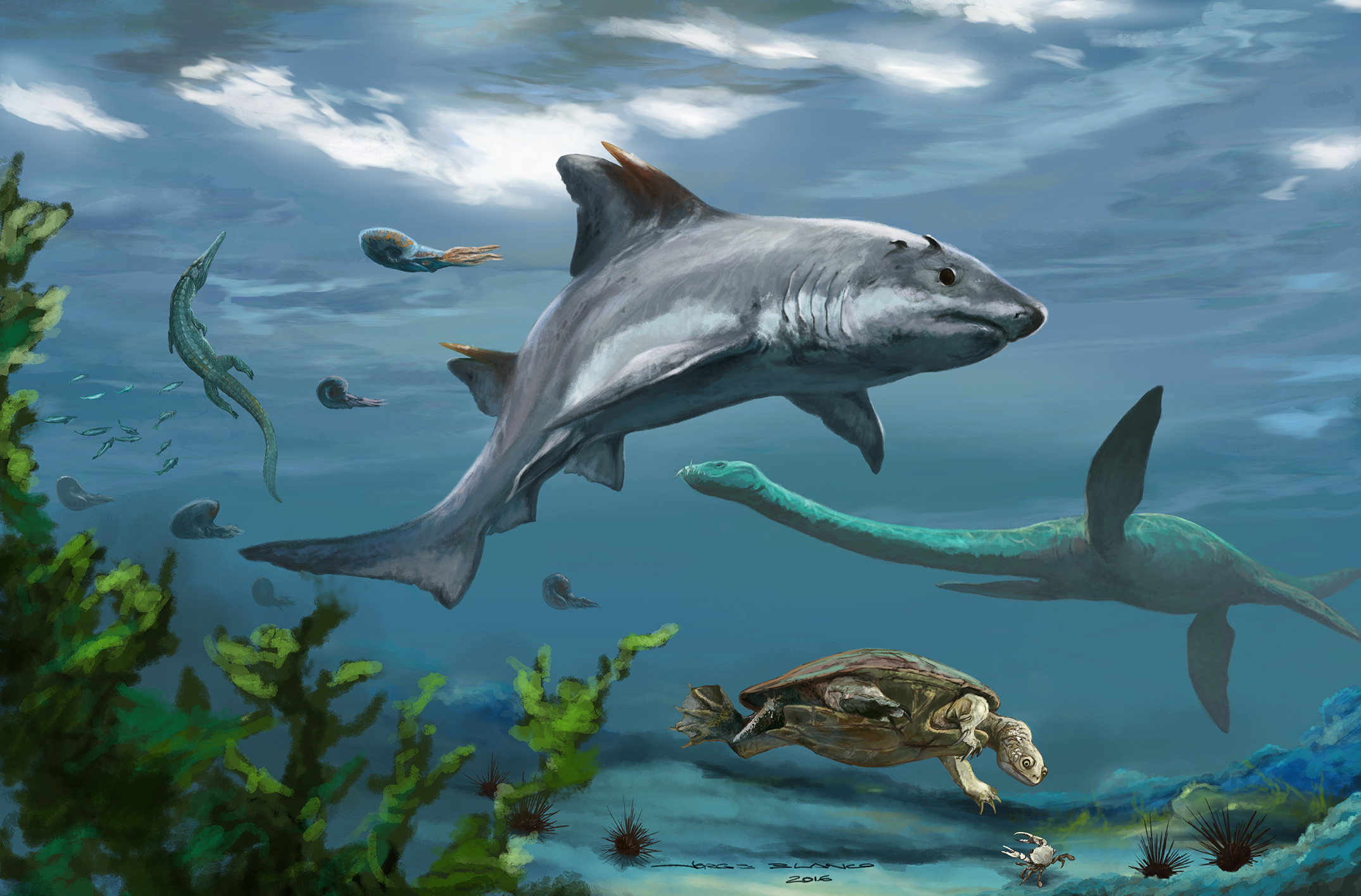
Strophodus and other animals from Rosablanca Formation

Fossils of Early Cretaceous animals from the Valanginian-Hauterivian Rosablanca Formation were collected near Zapatoca. Fossil material include fishes, particularly pycnodonts and hybodontiform Strophodus, ichthyosaurs, elasmosaurids. Remains of turtles, including Notoemys zapatocaensis, possible ornithocheirid pterosaurs and ammonite Saynoceras verrucosum also known from this location. There is also a report about metriorhynchoid crocodylomorph from these deposits. During the Valanginian and Hauterivian ages, here was a shallow sea where hybodontiforms and pycnodontiforms played an important trophic role as shell-crushing predators.
