= 1901 in Colombia =

- Decades: 1880s; 1890s; 1900s; 1910s; 1920s
- See also: Other events of 1901; Timeline of Colombian history

Events of 1901 in Colombia.

== Incumbents ==
- President: José Manuel Marroquín (1900–1904)
- Minister of War:
  - José Domingo Ospina (until 28 March 1901)
  - Ramón González Valencia (28 March 1901–11 July 1901)
  - Pedro Nel Ospina (11 July 1901–4 September 1901)
  - José Vicente Concha (4 September 1901–1902)

== Events ==
=== Ongoing ===
- Thousands Days' War

=== January–July ===
- January – Liberal General Benjamin Herrera accompanied by Belisario Porras and Victoriano Lorenzo arrived in the city of Aguadulce (now Aguadulce, Panama) and demanded the surrender of the Conservative forces defending the city. The Conservative army refused.
- 23 February 23–27 August – Battle of Aguadulce
- June – Conservative government sent a much larger force to recapture the city. This operation was much more properly planned than the earlier defense of the city. The planned involved on a force, led by General Luis Morales Berti, to advance from the locality of Anton towards Aguadulce, while the other, led by General Francisco Castro, to advance from the west and to complete the pincer. However, General Castro preferred to move on Anton and to unite his forces with those of General Berti. This error was taken advantage of by the Liberal forces, who used the extra time to escape.
- 28–29 July – Battle of San Cristóbal.

== Births ==
- 10 January – Gabriel Turbay, politician and physician (d. 1947)

== Deaths ==
- 9 January – Santos Acosta, general and political figure (b.1828)
- 11 September – Medardo Rivas, writer (b. 1825)
