= Silvia Duzán =

Colombian journalist (1960–1990)

Silvia Margarita Duzán Sáenz (January 23, 1960 – February 26, 1990) was a Colombian journalist who was assassinated by paramilitary forces in the Third Cimitarra Massacre.

== Biography ==
Silvia Duzán was born in Bogotá in 1960. Her father was the columnist Lucio Duzán, and her sister María Jimena Duzán also became a journalist. Silvia Duzán studied economics at the University of the Andes, where she and her sister founded a student publication, and at the University of Oxford. She married young, to the older economist Salomón Kalmanovitz.

After the paramilitary group Muerte a Secuestradores attacked journalists at the newspaper El Espectador, Duzán began to pursue journalism, writing for both El Espectador and other publications. She reported on gang activity in Bogotá, Medellín, and the Chocó forests, particularly via documentary filmmaking.

At the time of her death, Duzán was working on a documentary for the BBC about the Association of Peasant Workers of the Carare (ATCC), one of the first peace organizations in Colombia.

== Death ==
On February 26, 1990, Duzán was assassinated in the restaurant La Tata in Cimitarra, Santander Department, where she was meeting with regional peasant leaders. Despite warnings of a possible attack, they were taken by surprise by three paramilitary fighters, who carried out the Third Cimitarra Massacre. Duzán was injured in the attack, and died in a nearby hospital. The ATCC's Josué Vargas, Miguel Ángel Barajas, and Saúl Castañeda were killed alongside her.

=== Aftermath ===
Thirty-seven people were investigated in the massacre, including the paramilitary fighter Hermógenes Mosquera, a.k.a. Mojao, who was close to the Middle Magdalena Valley paramilitary leader Henry Pérez. Others who were investigated included Ramón Isaza, commander of the Autodefensas Campesinas de Magdalena Medio group, and Ernesto Báez. In 1992, the Autodefensas Campesinas del Magdalena Medio claimed responsibility for this and other attacks, and announced the execution of Ariel Otero for them.

Her death was declared a crime against humanity in 2020.

== Homages ==
- Silvia Duzán's sister María Jimena Duzán wrote the book Mi viaje al infierno (2010) about her death.
- Sergio Cabrera's film La Estrategia del Caracol, which Duzán had been working on for many years, includes a dedication to her.
- In 2015, a Punto de Articulación Social in Fontibón, Bogotá, was named for her.
