= Colegio Cristiano El-Shaddai =

Private school in Barranquilla, Colombia

Location
- Barranquilla, Colombia

Information
- Type: Private
- Established: 1986
- Founder: Sonia Calderon

Colegio Cristiano El Shaddai (El-Shaddai Christian School) is a private bilingual toddlers-through-secondary education inclusive school, located in the north of Colombia, in the city of Barranquilla. It is accredited by the Colombian Ministry of National Education and certified by the European Foundation for Quality Management EFQM. It is also in the list of the Colombian high-ranking schools for infant education, published by the Colombian Association of Preschool Education. Its inclusive education program caters to both students with typical development and disabled children. Its special education students include boys and girls who have been diagnosed with autism, Down syndrome, learning disabilities, attention deficit hyperactivity disorder, and other behavior disorders. These students study along with their non-disabled peers.

The school is divided into several departments, such as the therapy center, the academic department, the office of the chaplain, and the special education department. It provides education for a population that is usually left out of the school system or receives no treatment.

== History ==
Colegio Cristiano El-Shaddai was founded in 1986 by Sonia Calderon, B.S. and M.Ed. in special education from the University of Arizona in Tucson,. She is also a behavior specialist from Pennsylvania State University. The school was initially named Integral Therapeutic and Special Education Center APRENDO, but in 2001 its name was changed to Colegio Cristiano El-Shaddai.

When it was founded, less than 5% of the Colombian disabled children had the opportunity to go to school. In 1993 the school launched the Aprendo Foundation in order to give education and treatment to disabled children from low-income families who could not afford inclusive education or therapies. The foundation raised funds from the big companies in the city and secured the financial means so that a group of poor children could obtain an education and treatment. In 2001, it started to offer pre-school and elementary education to students with typical development.

More than 400 children with special education needs have been treated by El-Shaddai Christian School professionals. Several of those treated currently hold jobs and lead productive lives.

El-Shaddai Christian School has taken part in different types of workshops and seminars, research projects, and cultural events since its foundation.

== Services ==
Colegio Cristiano El-Shaddai offers inclusive education, which according to the Colombian Ministry of National Education allows children with disabilities and special education needs to have the same educational opportunities as their peers with typical development, and according to UNESCO, respects the rights of learners to a quality education that meets their learning needs.

Before placing disabled students in the regular classes, Colegio Cristiano El-Shaddai prepares them so that they will successfully benefit from the virtues of inclusive education. They usually begin with individual work with a teacher or therapist, with whom they learn necessary skills for successful interaction in the inclusive classes. When the individual work is completed, the students start work in a special education classroom, where they receive further preparation before they are fully integrated in a regular classroom.

The school offers bilingual education with dual language programs aiming at bilingualism, biliteracy, and cross-cultural competence in both Spanish and English. Its therapy center provides services for the school's students and outside patients, both private and referred by the Colombian social security and health care system. The center's staff are psychologists, speech therapists, physical therapists, occupational therapists, and special and regular education arts, music, band, dance, and chorus teachers. The school also offers pre-vocational courses, catch-up programs, craftsmanship courses, parent counseling, student counseling, and social work. The office of the chaplain provides counseling and spiritual care for the school's students, their families, and the school's staff.

== ABA ==
The school's methodologies applied in the inclusion and special education processes are based on ABA, which is the acronym for Applied Behavior Analysis. ABA, which applies principles from the science of behavior to understand human behavior, has been implemented across various settings including hospitals, schools, and homes in a variety of behavior and learning problems. It is also an effective tool for improving the lives of people with autism spectrum disorders. According to Mental Health: A report of the Surgeon General, "thirty years of research demonstrated the efficacy of applied behavioral methods in reducing inappropriate behavior and in increasing communication, learning, and appropriate social behavior " in autistic children. The Colombian health authorities approved ABA as a therapeutic protocol to modify behavior.

== Partnerships ==
Colegio Cristiano El-Shaddai has established partnerships with the following organizations to further its inclusion programs:

Combarranquilla

Effective Learning Environments (Los Angeles, CA) for ABA training of El-Shaddai professional staff

Fundación Educación para todos APRENDO, an NGO dedicated to provide special education services, school integration, therapeutic attention, and ABA therapies to children with special education needs from low-income families. This NGO has offices in Barranquilla, Colombia, and Weston, Florida.

Cajacopi

Fondo de Pasivos Sociales de Ferrocarriles Nacionales de Colombia

Comfamiliar

Cervecería Aguila

== The name ==
It includes the word Christian because the school is run on Christian principles.

El-Shaddai is a Hebrew name for God. El means power, might, and strength. Shad means breast, which indicates fulfilment and nourishment. Dai means enough, complete sufficiency. El-Shaddai can be translated as the all sufficient God
