= 1848 in Colombia =

- Decades: 1820s; 1830s; 1840s; 1850s; 1860s
- See also: Other events of 1848; Timeline of Colombian history

Events in the year 1848 in Colombia.

== Incumbents ==
- President: Tomás Cipriano de Mosquera

== Events ==
=== February ===
8 February - The Treaty of Lima is signed.

=== July ===
- 16 July - The Liberal Party of Colombia is founded.

=== Unknown ===
Citizens of New Granada demand that general José Hilario López get elected as president.

=== Ongoing events ===
Revolution of 1848.

== Births ==
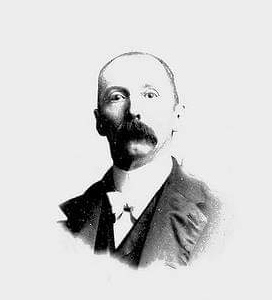
Jorge Holguin

- 9 April - Ezequiél Moreno y Díaz (died 1906)
- 28 May - Maria Bernarda Bütler (died 1924)
- 30 October - Jorge Holguín (died 1928)
