= 1933 Colombian parliamentary election =

Congressional elections were held in Colombia on 14 May 1933 to elect the Chamber of Representatives. The result was a victory for the Liberal Party, which won 74 of the 118 seats.

== Results ==
Party	Votes	%	Seats
Colombian Liberal Party	604,372	62.44	74
Colombian Conservative Party	361,571	37.36	44
Other parties	1,923	0.20	0
Total	967,866	100.00	118
Source: Nohlen
