= 1849 in Colombia =

- Decades: 1820s; 1830s; 1840s; 1850s; 1860s
- See also: Other events of 1849; Timeline of Colombian history

Events in the year 1849 in Colombia.

== Incumbents ==
- President: Tomás Cipriano de Mosquera (Until April 1)
- President: José Hilario López (Since April 1)

== Events ==
=== April ===
- 1 April - José Hilario López is elected President of the Republic of New Granada.

=== October ===
- 4 October - The Colombian Conservative Party is founded.

== Births ==
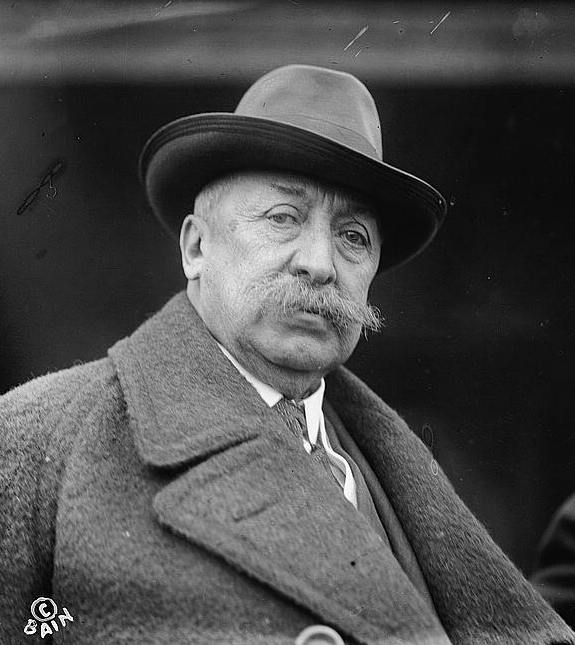
Rafael Reyes

- 12 January - Candelario Obeso, poet, (Died 1884)
- 24 October - Luis Antonio Robles, politician, (Died 1899)
- 5 December - Rafael Reyes, politician, (Died 1921)
