= Miguel Acuña =

Fray Miguel Acuña (1788–1847) was a Franciscan priest and medical practitioner in New Granada (present-day Colombia). He was born in Zapatoca in the Socorro Province, and was received into the Franciscan order at the age of 21. He was famous in Bogotá for his knowledge of medicine and for his exemplary life. He spent the majority of his religious life in the convent of San Francisco de Bogotá, where he was visited by a regular stream of people from all walks of life, eager to seek relief from their ailments through his prescriptions.

He died in Bogotá in 1847.

== See also ==
- Catholic Church in Colombia
