= Juan David Díaz =

Colombian footballer (born 1987)

Personal information
- Full name: Juan David Díaz Navarro
- Date of birth: 27 August 1987 (age 39)
- Place of birth: Colombia
- Height: 1.87 m (6 ft 2 in)

Senior career*
Years	Team	Apps	(Gls)
2007–2013	Bogotá		
2014	Tuluá		
- * Club domestic league appearances and goals as of 2016

Juan David Díaz Navarro (born 27 August 1987) is a Colombian footballer who plays as a midfielder.
