= 1987 in Colombia =

- Decades: 1960s; 1970s; 1980s; 1990s; 2000s
- See also: Other events of 1987; Timeline of Colombian history

Events of 1987 in Colombia.

== Incumbents ==
- President: Virgilio Barco Vargas (1986–1990).
- Vice President: N/A. (Note: The Office of the Vice President was officially abolished by the 1905 National Constituent Assembly on 28 March 1905, and it was only reinstituted after the ratification of the new 1991 Constitution and filled in the following presidential elections in 1994.)

== Events ==
=== Ongoing ===
- Colombian conflict.

=== January ===
- 23 January – The 1987 South American U-20 Championship begins in Armenia.

=== February ===
- 8 February – The 1987 South American U-20 Championship ends, Colombia wins.
- 28 February – Santa Clara massacre: Armed men break into a house in Santa Clara, Fundación, Magdalena and kidnap a family of 4 and execute them in Puerto Piedra. The perpetrators are never determined.

=== March ===
- 3 March – San Sebastián massacre: 5 people are murdered in rural San Sebastián, Cauca by armed men and are buried in a mass grave. The perpetrators are never determined.
- 5-6 March – 1987 Ecuador earthquakes: 6.0-7.2 Mw.

=== April ===
- 13 April – Cimitarra Massacre: The village of Número Siete in Cimitarra, Santander is attacked by around 90 members of the Self-Defense Forces of Puerto Boyacá, who bring with them a list of names. They gather 14 people they accuse of being leftist guerilla sympathizers and execute them by the Carare River bank.

=== June ===
- 10-22 June – The 37th Vuelta a Colombia is held, Pablo Wilches wins.

=== July ===
- 11 July – The Colombia national football team plays Argentina in the third place play off leading up to the 1987 Copa América. Colombia wins 2–1.

=== August ===
- 23 August – Popayán massacre.

=== September ===
- September – El Porvenir massacre.

=== October ===
- 11 October – Jaime Pardo Leal, 1986 presidential candidate for the Patriotic Union, is assassinated in a drive-by shooting between La Mesa and Bogotá.

=== November ===
- 21 November – Narco-trafficker Jorge Ochoa is captured in El Cerrito, Valle del Cauca.

=== December ===
- 30 December – Jorge Ochoa is released from prison on a habeas corpus petition.

Simón Bolívar Guerrilla Coordinating Board flag

=== Uncertain ===
- The Simón Bolívar Guerrilla Coordinating Board (CGSB) is formed.

== Births ==
- 27 August – Juan David Díaz, footballer.
- 27 September – Karen Carreño, model.
- 1 December – Valeria Santa, actor.

== Deaths ==
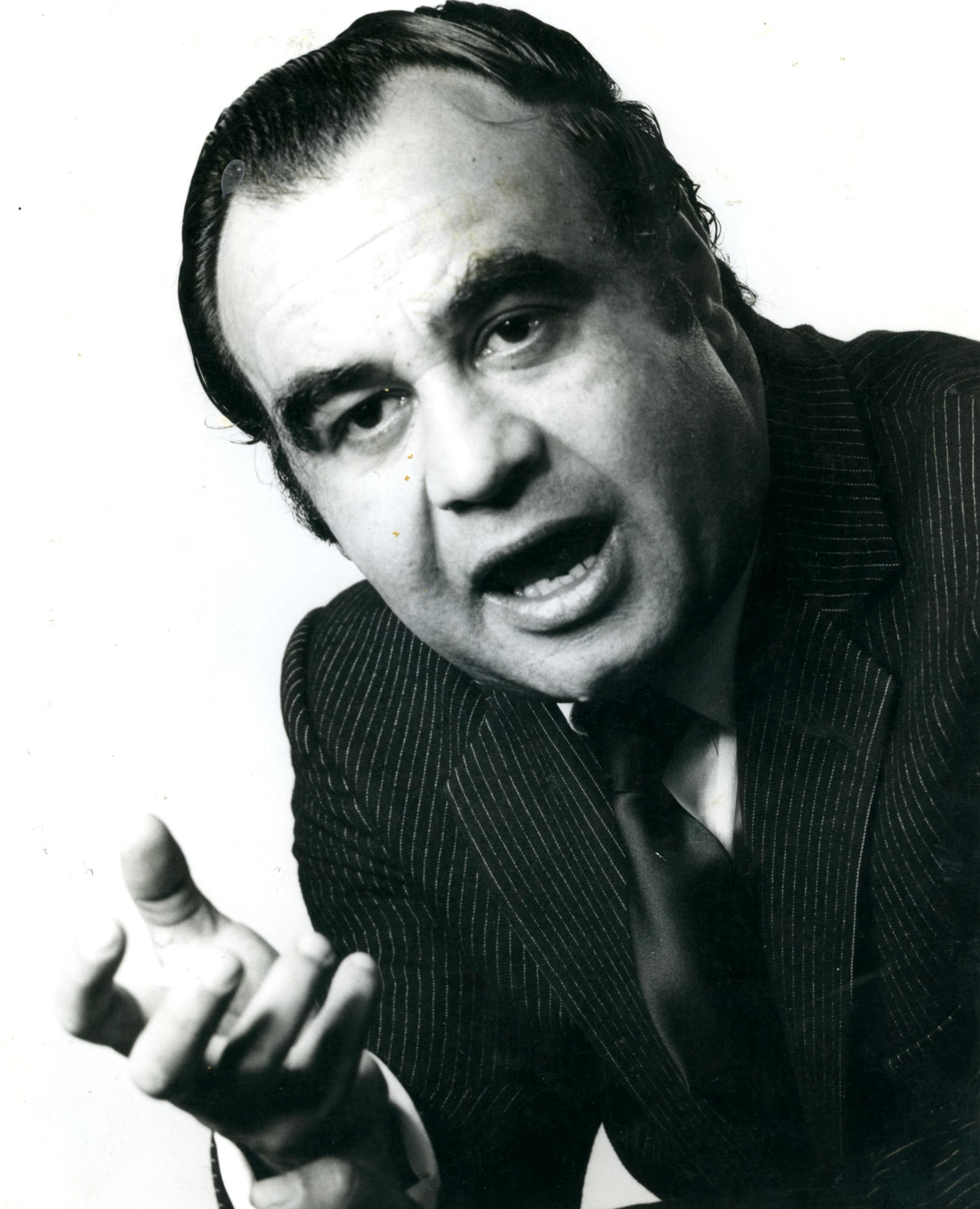
Jaime Pardo Leal

- 11 October – Jaime Pardo Leal, union leader, lawyer, and politician (b. 1941).
