= Tobías Enrique Pumarejo =

Colombian songwriter

- Also known as: Don Toba
- Born: Tobías Enrique Pumarejo Gutiérrez; 8 August 1906–1910; Valledupar, Colombia
- Died: 8 April 1995 (aged 84–88) Barranquilla, Colombia

Tobías Enrique Pumarejo Gutiérrez (Note: In this Spanish name, the first or paternal surname is Pumarejo and the second or maternal family name is Gutiérrez.) (early 1900s – 1995), also known as Don Toba, was a Colombian songwriter. He was an early composer of vallenato, and altogether wrote over 150 songs in a wide range of styles.

== Biography ==
Pumarejo was born on 8 August, sometime in 1906–1910, (Note: Reported birth years include 1906, 1908, 1909, and 1910.) in Valledupar, and grew up in Patillal. He attended high school in Medellín.

=== Music career ===
In Medellín, Pumarejo founded the Orquesta Magdalenense alongside José María and Pedro Castro Monsalvo, Pedro and Celso Castro Trespalacios, and Guillermo Hurtado Calderón. While in the group Pumarejo wrote his first song, "Mi Cabaña".

Pumarejo was an early composer of vallenato, and taught songwriters Rafael Escalona and Gustavo Gutiérrez Cabello. In 1948 he famously took part in a vallenato parranda with Guillermo Buitrago, and he was one of the judges at the first Vallenato Legend Festival.

=== Personal life and death ===
Pumarejo was married to Ruth Ladrón de Guevara, with whom he had 7 children. He was also a well-known womanizer. He died on 8 April 1995 in Barranquilla, where he was buried in the Jardines del Recuerdo cemetery. Los Hermanos Zuleta played at his funeral.

== Musical style and compositions ==
Pumarejo wrote over 150 songs in a wide variety of styles, including pasillo, waltz, ranchera, and all four airs of vallenato. He wrote several songs about horses, including "El Alazanito" and "Los Tres Caballos". His song "La Víspera de Año Nuevo" is a well-known Christmas song. His other notable compositions include "Mírame Fijamente", "La Cita", "Muchacha Patillalera", "Los Tres Hermanos", "Calláte Corazoncito", "Nueve de Mayo", "Ojos Penetrantes", "Alma de Valledupar", "Mi Potrerito", "Sabana Sananjera", "La Mariposa", "Tres de Marzo", "La Muerte de Pedro Castro", "Mala Suerte", "Siete de Enero", and "Desolación".

Pumarejo only ever recorded two of his own compositions: "Viva Alfonso López" (written to support the presidential run of Alfonso López Michelsen) and "Callate Corazón". His songs have been recorded by artists including Colacho Mendoza, Luis Enrique Martínez, Alejo Durán, Binomio de Oro, and Alfredo Gutiérrez.
