= Gustavo Dávila =

Colombian footballer (1985-2014)

Personal information
- Full name: Gustavo Adolfo Dávila Valencia
- Date of birth: July 9, 1985
- Place of birth: Cali, Colombia
- Date of death: June 30, 2014 (aged 28)
- Place of death: Jamundí, Colombia
- Height: 1.80 m (5 ft 11 in)
- Position: Midfielder

Senior career*
Years	Team	Apps	(Gls)
2005–2008	Envigado		
2008–2010	Itagüí		
2011–2012	Atlético Bucaramanga	18	(1)
2013	Cortuluá	4	(1)
2013	Patriotas	3	(0)
- * Club domestic league appearances and goals

Gustavo Dávila (July 9, 1985 – June 30, 2014) was a Colombian football midfielder. His last club was Patriotas.

== Death ==
On 30 June 2014, Dávila drowned in the Guachinte River near Jamundí.
