= Luis Carlos González =

Colombian poet and lyricist (1908–1985)

- Born: Luis Carlos González Mejía; 26 September 1908; Pereira, Colombia
- Died: 17 August 1985 (aged 76); Pereira, Colombia

Luis Carlos González Mejía (Note: In this Spanish name, the first or paternal surname is González and the second or maternal family name is Mejía.) (1908–1985) was a Colombian poet and lyricist. Many of his poems were put to music, and he is considered one of the most significant lyricists of the bambuco genre. His poem "La Ruana", which was made into a song of the same name by José Macías, is taught in schools in Risaralda.

== Biography ==
Luis Carlos González Mejía was born on 26 September 1908 in Pereira, in the Colombian department of Risaralda.

González wrote poetry about rural Colombian life, and his subjects included cattle herders, aguardiente, and the customs of local people. His poems were initially published in the weekly magazine Sábado, and later collected in his first book, Sibaté, which was published in 1944. He went on to publish several other books of poetry.

Many of González's poems were put to music, mostly in bambuco style, by composers including Arturo Henao, Fabio Ospina, Francisco Bedoya, and Gustavo Adolfo Renjifo. González is considered one of the most significant lyricists of the bambuco genre. José Macías wrote the song "La Ruana" using lyrics from González's poem of the same name, which since 2018 has been taught in schools in Risaralda. For several years, González helped organise the National Bambuco Competition in Pereira.

González died in Pereira on 17 August 1985. On 26 September 2008, the centenary of his birth, González was celebrated by the creation of the día de la pereiranidad (lit. transl. "day of Pereira-nity"), a day of festivities in Pereira.

== Books of poetry ==
- Sibaté (1944)
- Pereira canta (1963)
- Asilo de versos (1963)
- Fototipias de Urbano Cañarte (1978)
- Retocando imágenes (1984)
