= Enrique Low Murtra =

Colombian lawyer and politician (1939–1991)

Colombian Minister of Justice
- In office September 7, 1987 – August 10, 1988
- President: Virgilio Barco Vargas
- Preceded by: Eduardo Suescún Monroy
- Succeeded by: Mónica de Greiff

Personal details
- Born: Enrique Low Murtra; March 23, 1949 Bogotá D.M., Colombia
- Died: April 30, 1991 (aged 42) Bogotá, D.C., Colombia
- Cause of death: Assassination
- Spouse: Yoshiko Nakayama (m. 1963)
- Children: Amalia Low Nakayama; Olga Low Nakayama
- Parent(s): Rudolf Low Maus; María Murtra Casanovas
- Education: National University of Colombia; University of Illinois; Harvard University; La Salle University; Universidad Externado de Colombia; University of the Andes; University of Valle
- Profession: Lawyer

Enrique Low Murtra (March 23, 1939 – April 30, 1991) was a Colombian lawyer and politician. He served as minister of justice under President Virgilio Barco Vargas, and was assassinated by orders of Pablo Escobar because of his work as minister, like his predecessors, in prosecuting cocaine traffickers mainly belonging to the Medellín Cartel.

== Beginnings ==
Low Murtra was born in Bogotá, the second son of the German researcher and academic Rudolf Low Maus and María Murtra Casanovas, a Catalan Spaniard immigrant, both chemical researchers. During his childhood he faced serious health problems that would forever mark his life. A few days after he was born his life was threatened by an illness that could never be clearly diagnosed and that also caused problems in his education; at the age of three he was involved in a traffic accident that left him in a coma for several days, and in 1949 he suffered from a rheumatic disease that permanently affected his motor skills, but which he often joked about. However, probably the hardest blow was the death of his mother in 1947 from liver cancer, the result of her research with carcinogenic agents.

Low Murtra was a student at the Gimnasio Campestre in Bogotá and graduated from the National University of Colombia in 1961. With a scholarship from the Fulbright Foundation, he traveled in 1962 to the University of Illinois to study economics, and there he met Yoshiko Nakayama, whom he married in June 1963. From this marriage were born his two daughters, Amalia and Olga. Low Murtra also studied at Harvard University (1966) and worked as a teacher at the La Salle University, the Externado University of Colombia, University of The Andes and the University of Valle.

== Civil servant ==
Despite a short tenure as a teacher, Low Murtra became the Global Director of the National Planning Department (NPD) in 1970. Low Murtra was awarded the Order of St. George in the rank of Knight in 1956, for being an outstanding student at the Gimnasio Campestre. In 1986, he received the Order of St. George in the rank of Officer and, years later, the rank of Commander, the highest award given by the Gimnasio.

At the end of his term in office in 1974, he traveled to Washington where he worked as an official at the World Bank. In 1976 Low Murtra returned to Colombia and worked as a research economist at Fedesarrollo. He later became vice president of the National Association of Industrialists, ANDI, Comptroller of Bogotá and Magistrate of the Council of State where, with the courage that always characterized him, he faced and survived the assault on the Palace of Justice by the M-19 in November 1985, saving the life of his colleague Lubín Ramírez who was seriously injured. In 1986, President Virgilio Barco named him director of the National Training Service (SENA); in office, Low-Murtra brought a university-based approach to SENA, as well as a code of morality and transparency for the progress of Colombia, both of which are still in force. At that time, in consideration of his high professional merits, and since he had received the highest honors from society and the state, Low Murtra received the Order of Saint George in the degree of Commander and became the first alumnus to receive such an honor.

== Minister of Justice ==
My voice may tremble but never my morale.

— Enrique Low Murtra.

On October 11, 1987, while the decree for his appointment as Colombian ambassador to Washington was being processed, President Barco called Low Murtra to entrust him with the difficult task of being minister of justice, a position that at that time meant a death sentence because his predecessors, from Rodrigo Lara Bonilla, had either been murdered or had been targeted by the Medellín Cartel. Low Murtra openly declared himself in favor of the extradition of drug lords to the USA. Low Murtra confirmed the state's war against drug trafficking, and was the target of death threats after revealing that Jaime Pardo Leal, former presidential candidate for the UP, had been murdered on the orders of Gonzalo Rodríguez Gacha. Death threats increased after Low Murtra signed the extradition orders against the leadership of the Medellín Cartel; Pablo Escobar, Rodríguez Gacha and the Ochoa brothers.

== Ambassador to Switzerland ==
Following the kidnapping and subsequent murder of Attorney General Carlos Mauro Hoyos, threats against Low Murtra became more and more frequent, leading President Barco to appoint him ambassador to Switzerland. Low Murtra served as ambassador, accompanied by his family, with whom he lived in relative peace. But Low Murtra was deeply affected by the murder of Luis Carlos Galán, and the terrorist group ETA threatened him because he was Escobar's liaison in Europe, allegedly complicit in the failed attack against Enrique Parejo González, former minister of justice and Colombian ambassador to Hungary. A coffin with the Colombian flag covered in lamb blood arrived at the Colombian embassy as a threat, so Low Murtra was strictly protected without leaving for 6 months. However, after César Gaviria took office as President of Colombia in 1990, the government did not ratify him in office, so he had to return to Colombia. Low Murtra asked to serve as ambassador to another country, knowing that he would be assassinated, but his pleas were ignored, as Foreign Minister Luis Fernando Jaramillo Correa underestimated that the Medellin Cartel would assassinate him.

== Death ==
Killing Enrique Low was like killing a child

— Yoshiko Nakamura's statement on the murder of her husband Enrique Low Murtra.

In January 1991 Low Murtra and his family returned to Colombia. Low Murtra taught economics and law at the Javeriana, Externado and La Salle Universities. Forgotten by the State, Low Murtra wandered around the city of Bogotá without any protection, fulfilling his academic duties. His last job, besides teaching, was dean of the economics faculty at the Universidad de la Salle. On April 30, 1991 – seven years after the murder of Lara Bonilla – after his workday, Low Murtra approached a taxi to see if he could take him, and immediately, Darío de Jesús Giraldo, a hitman in Escobar's service, killed him with three shots. The taxi driver took him to the San Ignacio Hospital where Low Murtra arrived dead. Justice condemned the nation for having unprotected Low Murtra.
