= 1941 Colombian parliamentary election =

Congressional elections were held in Colombia on 16 March 1941 to elect the Chamber of Representatives. The Liberal Party received the most votes.

== Results ==
Party	Votes	%	Seats
Colombian Liberal Party	565,237	63.83	82
Colombian Conservative Party	316,185	35.71	49
Other parties	4,103	0.46	0
Total	885,525	100.00	131
Source: Nohlen, Abente et al.
