= 1994 in Colombia =

- Decades: 1970s; 1980s; 1990s; 2000s; 2010s
- See also: Other events of 1994; Timeline of Colombian history

Events of 1994 in Colombia.

== Incumbents ==
- President:
  - César Gaviria (7 August 1990–7 August 1994).
  - Ernesto Samper (7 August 1994–7 August 1998).
- Vice President:
  - Humberto De la Calle (7 August 1994–19 September 1997). (Note: The Office of the Vice President was officially abolished by the 1905 National Constituent Assembly on 28 March 1905, and it was only reinstituted after the ratification of the new 1991 Constitution with Vice President de la Calle taking office after the following presidential elections in 1994.)

== Events ==
=== Ongoing ===
- Colombian conflict.
- Massacre of Trujillo.

=== January ===
- 6 January – The Attorney General's office of Colombia announces that it has conducted a raid in Jerusalén, Ciudad Bolívar, Bogotá against El Parche gang, arresting 23 people, 13 of whom are children.
- 31 January – An avalanche in Florida, Valle del Cauca kills 14 with 60 others missing.

=== February ===
- 13 February – Three homeless children, Javier Gonzalez (16), Jairo Murcia (14), “Asprilla” (12), are shot while sleeping and killed in Timiza, Bogotá. They are believed to be victims of the "social cleansing" carried out by armed right-wing gangs and militias.

=== March ===
- 13 March – The 1994 legislative election takes place. The Liberal Party wins majorities in both house, 88/163 Chamber seats and 56/102 Senate seats.

=== April ===
- 27-29 April – On the 27th, Benjamin Santos is kidnapped from his home in Barrancabermeja by a Colombian Army counter-insurgency unit; he is seen in an army uniform, forced to 'patrol' the community with the unit. His body, showing signs of torture, is dumped in the local cemetery on the 29th.

=== May ===
- 25 May – A public bus on Avenida Boyacá in Bogotá is hijacked by seven men and a woman; they rob and rape its passengers. They would be caught by police four days later.

=== June ===
- 6 June – 1994 Páez River earthquake: Over 1,000 indigenous Páez people die as a result of a 6.8 magnitude earthquake at the Páez River and ensuing mudslides and avalanches.
- 13 June – México, Colombia, and Venezuela sign the G3 Free Trade Agreement.
- 19 June – The 1994 presidential election take place; Ernesto Samper wins, becoming the 29th President of Colombia.

=== July ===
- 2 July – Andrés Escobar is shot dead in Medellín.
- 7 July – The Disappearances Law, which was passed by Congress, is vetoed by president Gaviria.

=== August ===
- 7 August – The 29th President of Colombia, Ernesto Samper, is inaugurated.

=== September ===
- Human rights activist Jairo Barahona, who had previously been subjected to harassment by security forces, is disappeared by people identifying themselves as National Police a part of the Anti-Extortion and Kidnapping Unit (UNASE).

=== October ===
- 16-17 October – Robbery on the Bank of the Republic: In Valledupar,
- 30 October – The 1994 local elections take place.

=== November ===
- 2 November – A police convoy is ambushed in Puracé, Cauca by FARC and ELN rebels, killing 11 police officers and two bystanders.

=== December ===
- 16 December –President Samper signs the ratification Protocol II of the Geneva Convention.

== Births ==
- 28 January – Maluma, singer.
- 12 March – Carlos Ramírez, cyclist and Olympic bronze winner.
- 23 September – Yerry Mina, footballer.

== Deaths ==
- 2 July – Andrés Escobar, footballer (b. 1967).
- 20 October – Lucy González, singer (b. 1933)
