= Honduras and La Negra farms massacre =

1988 massacre of farmworkers orchestrated by the Colombian Army

- Part of Colombian conflict
- Native name: Masacre de las fincas Honduras y La Negra
- Location: Honduras farm and La Negra farm Turbo, Antioquia, Colombia
- Date: March 4, 1988; 38 years ago
- Deaths: 20

The Honduras and La Negra farms massacre, also known as the Urabá massacre, was the 4 March 1988 mass killing of farmworkers at the Honduras and La Negra farms in Turbo, Urabá, Antioquia, Colombia.

20-30 armed men in civilian clothing attacked the Honduras farm in Currulao, Antioquia and killed 17 of its unionized peasant banana workers. The same men then traveled to the nearby La Negra farm and killed three of its workers.

The perpetrators were concluded to be assassins financed by the Association of Farmers and Stockbreeders of Magdalena Medio (ACDEGAM) in coordination with the Colombian Army's Voltíjeros battalion, who were aided by former Popular Liberation Army (EPL) guerrillas.

== Victims ==
=== Honduras farm victims ===
The first 17 victims at the Honduras farm were sleeping with their families and other workers when they were attacked. They were all active members of the Antioquia Agricultural workers Trade Union (SINTAGRO). The perpetrators called out the victim's names one by one, ordered them to lie on the ground, and shot them.

- Pedro Miguel Gonzalez Martinez (20)
- Jose Bienvenido Gonzalez Martinez (20)
- Jose Mesa Sanchez
- Jose Joaquin Mendoza (30)
- Ivan Dario Molina (35)
- Rodrigo Guzman Espita (35)
- Manuel Espita Cogollo (40)
- Enrique Guizao Giraldo (47)
- Rito Martinez Reyes (28)
- Santiago Ortiz Caudo (40)
- Nestor Mariño Galvez (45)
- Jose Indovel Pineda (29)
- Nataniel Rojas Restrepo (48)
- Omar Ochoa
- Guillermo Leon Valencia
- Manuel Durango
- Jose Francisco Blanco

=== La Negra farm victims ===
- Julian Carrillo
- Alirio Rojas
- Adel Menese Pineda

== Aftermath and impact ==
According to El Espectador, the massacre orphaned 59 children.

Following the massacre, the Antioquia Agricultural Workers Union (SINTARGO) and the Banana Workers Union (SINTRABANANO) announced an indefinite strike of their 22,000 farmworkers. They returned to work on 10 March 1988.

A memorial dedicated to the victims of the massacre, as well as 26 other murdered banana workers, stands in La Piña, Turbo, Antioquia.
