= 1989 in Colombia =

- Decades: 1960s; 1970s; 1980s; 1990s; 2000s
- See also: Other events of 1989; Timeline of Colombian history

Events of 1989 in Colombia.

== Incumbents ==
- President: Virgilio Barco Vargas (1986–1990).
- Vice President: N/A. (Note: The Office of the Vice President was officially abolished by the 1905 National Constituent Assembly on 28 March 1905, and it was only reinstituted after the ratification of the new 1991 Constitution and filled in the following presidential elections in 1994.)

== Events ==
=== Ongoing ===
- Colombian conflict.
- Massacre of Trujillo.
- Guns for Antigua.

=== January ===
- 18 January – La Rochela massacre.

=== February ===
- 27 February – Emerald magnate and Medellín Cartel affiliate Gilberto Molina is killed at his ranch in Sasaima, Cundinamarca along with 17 other people attending a party Molina was hosting.

=== March ===
- 1 March – The Revolutionary Armed Forces of Colombia (FARC) declare a unilateral ceasefire.

=== April ===
- 5 April – The National Disaster Office (ONAD) declares a yellow alert status (2nd of the 4 levels) due to seismic activity from the Galeras stratovolcano.

=== May ===
- 30 May – A car bomb containing 220 lbs of dynamite explodes in Bogotá. It kills 5, not including the intended target Miguel Maza Márquez, and injures over 100.

=== June ===
- 19 June – The Constituent Assembly passes a law blocking the extradition of drug traffickers outside of Colombia.

=== July ===
- 17-23 July – 1989 FINA World Junior Synchronized Swimming Championships.

=== August ===
- 5-8 August – 1989 South American Championships in Athletics.
- 18 August – Luis Carlos Galán is assassinated.

=== September ===
- 3 September – El Espectador offices in Bogotá are bombed, killing at least one person and injuring over 80.

=== October ===
- 1 October – Referee Álvaro Ortega is assassinated in Medellín. As a result, the 1989 Campeonato Professional was canceled.
- 15 October – 1990 FIFA World Cup qualification (CONMEBOL–OFC play-off).

=== November ===
- 27 November – Avianca Flight 203.

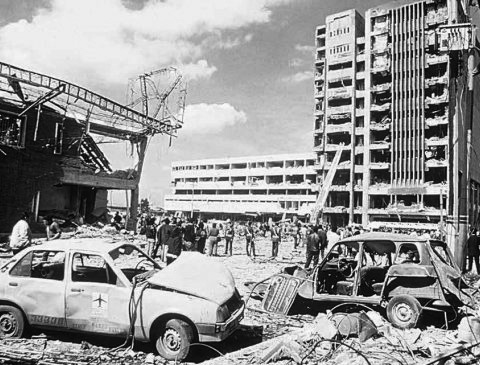
DAS Building bombing aftermath

=== December ===
- 6 December – DAS Building bombing.
- 17 December – 1989 Intercontinental Cup.
- 22 December – General Archive of the Nation (Colombia).

=== Uncertain ===
- 1989 Clásica del Tolima
- The Atlantis Primal Therapy Commune moves to Colombia from Ireland.

== Births ==
- 9 March – Camilo Vargas, footballer.
- 29 May – Diógenes Quintero, politician (d. 2026).
- 27 August – Andrés Mercado, actor and singer.
- 29 September – Laura Perico, telenovela actress.

== Deaths ==
- 27 February – Gilberto Molina, emerald magnate and Medellín Cartel affiliate (b. 1937).
- 11 June – Arnulfo Briceño, musician, songwriter, and lawyer (b. 1938).
- 18 August:
  - Waldemar Franklin Quintero, National Police commander (b. 1941).
  - Luis Carlos Galán, politician (b. 1943).
- 15 November – Alejo Durán, musician and songwriter (b. 1919).
