= Candelaria, Valle del Cauca =

Candelaria
- Municipality and town
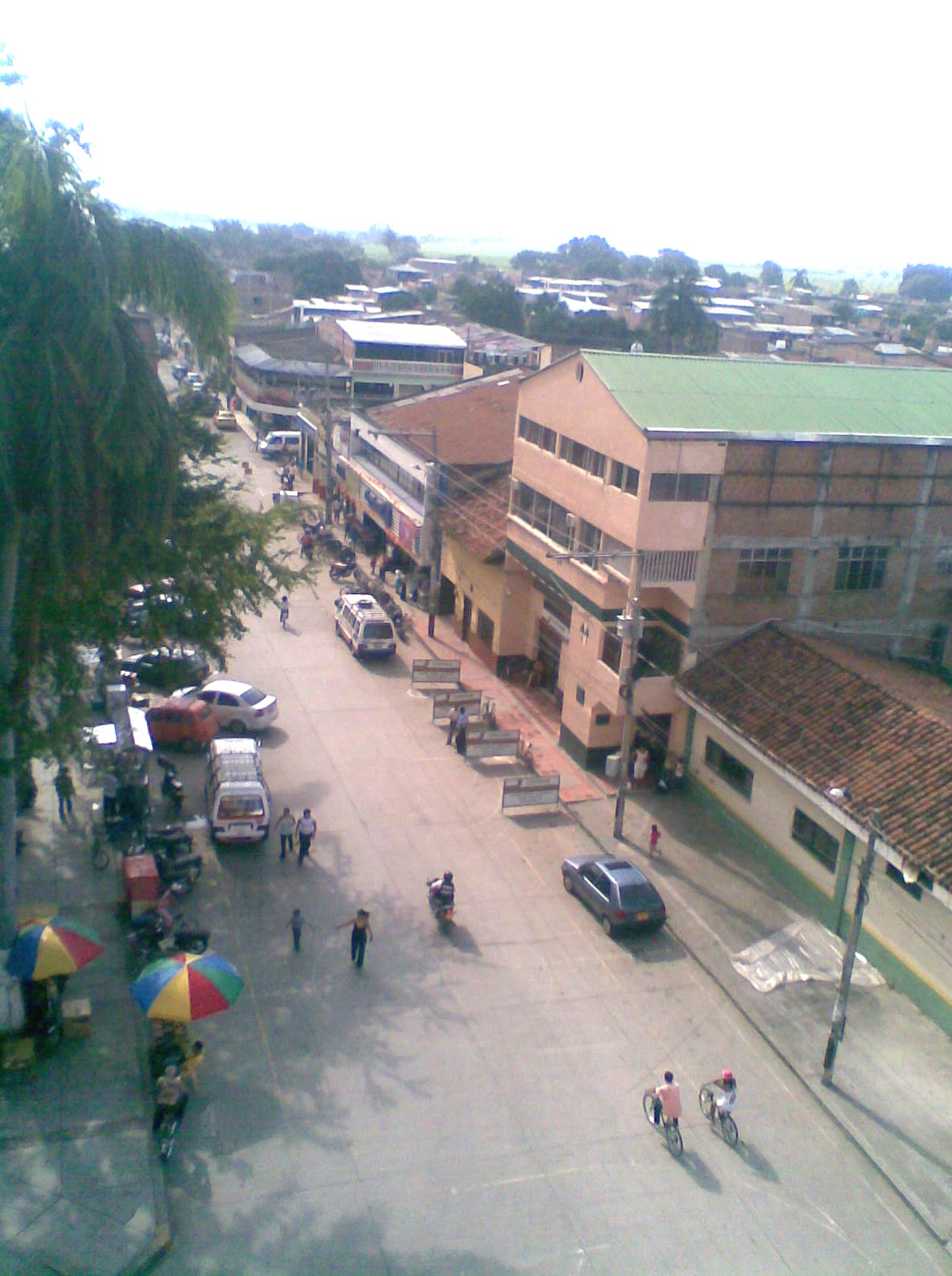

- Flag

- Location of the municipality and town of Candelaria, Valle del Cauca in the Valle del Cauca Department of Colombia.

- Location in Colombia
- Coordinates: 3°24′N 76°23′W
- Country: Colombia
- Department: Valle del Cauca Department

Area
  - Municipality and town: 296.5 km^{2} (114.5 sq mi)
  - Urban: 1.25 km^{2} (0.48 sq mi)

Population (2020 est.)
  - Municipality and town: 94,211
  - Density: 317.7/km^{2} (823.0/sq mi)
  - Urban: 23,940
  - Urban density: 19,200/km^{2} (49,600/sq mi)
- Time zone: UTC-5 (Colombia Standard Time)

Candelaria is a town and municipality located in the Department of Valle del Cauca, Colombia.

Candelaria in Colombia, is part of the metropolitan area of the city of Cali, along with the municipalities adjacent to it. Candelaria is located 28 km from Cali.

It has small villages such as El Tiple.

== Notable people ==
- Linda Caicedo (born 2005), footballer for the Colombia national team
