= Prado, Tolima =

Coordinates: 3°45′N 74°50′W

- Municipality and town
- Flag Coat of arms

- Location of the municipality and town of Prado, Tolima in the Tolima Department of Colombia.
- Country: Colombia
- Department: Tolima Department

Government
  - mayor: Álvaro González Murillo

Area
  - Total: 448 km^{2} (173 sq mi)
- Elevation: 321 m (1,053 ft)

Population (2017)
  - Total: 7,607
- Time zone: UTC-5 (Colombia Standard Time)

Prado (Spanish pronunciation: [ˈpɾaðo]) is a municipality in the Tolima department of Colombia. The population of the municipality was 9,291 as of the 1993 census.

== Climate ==
Climate data for Prado (Pst de Monta), elevation 349 m (1,145 ft), (1981–2010)
Month	Jan	Feb	Mar	Apr	May	Jun	Jul	Aug	Sep	Oct	Nov	Dec	Year
Mean daily maximum °C (°F)	33.1 (91.6)	33.4 (92.1)	32.7 (90.9)	32.4 (90.3)	32.6 (90.7)	33.2 (91.8)	34.2 (93.6)	35.0 (95.0)	34.5 (94.1)	33.2 (91.8)	32.0 (89.6)	32.2 (90.0)	33.2 (91.8)
Daily mean °C (°F)	28.0 (82.4)	28.0 (82.4)	27.8 (82.0)	27.5 (81.5)	27.6 (81.7)	27.8 (82.0)	28.2 (82.8)	29.0 (84.2)	28.8 (83.8)	28.0 (82.4)	27.5 (81.5)	27.6 (81.7)	28.0 (82.4)
Mean daily minimum °C (°F)	22.2 (72.0)	22.4 (72.3)	22.5 (72.5)	22.5 (72.5)	22.5 (72.5)	21.9 (71.4)	21.3 (70.3)	21.6 (70.9)	22.0 (71.6)	22.2 (72.0)	22.3 (72.1)	22.4 (72.3)	22.2 (72.0)
Average precipitation mm (inches)	98.5 (3.88)	137.1 (5.40)	209.3 (8.24)	193.5 (7.62)	139.5 (5.49)	61.4 (2.42)	39.4 (1.55)	38.6 (1.52)	116.8 (4.60)	240.5 (9.47)	251.6 (9.91)	207.3 (8.16)	1,714.1 (67.48)
Average precipitation days	8	10	13	14	11	9	6	5	9	14	15	12	122
Average relative humidity (%)	77	76	77	79	79	76	72	66	69	75	79	79	75
Mean monthly sunshine hours	201.5	163.7	148.8	138.0	148.8	162.0	179.8	182.9	162.0	176.7	171.0	186.0	2,021.2
Mean daily sunshine hours	6.5	5.8	4.8	4.6	4.8	5.4	5.8	5.9	5.4	5.7	5.7	6.0	5.5
Source: Instituto de Hidrologia Meteorologia y Estudios Ambientales
