= 1992 in Colombia =

- Decades: 1970s; 1980s; 1990s; 2000s; 2010s
- See also: Other events of 1992; Timeline of Colombian history

Events of 1992 in Colombia.

== Incumbents ==
- President: César Gaviria (1990–1994).
- Vice President: N/A. (Note: The Office of the Vice President was officially abolished by the 1905 National Constituent Assembly on 28 March 1905, and it was only reinstituted after the ratification of the new 1991 Constitution and filled in the following presidential elections in 1994.)

== Events ==
=== Ongoing ===
- Colombian conflict
- Massacre of Trujillo.

=== February ===
- 22 February – A military convoy is attacked with dynamite in a jungle region near the border between Remedios and Puerto Berrío in Antioquia while guarding a vehicle as part of the construction of an oil pipeline. 13 people are killed, one being a civilian driver.

=== March ===
- 31 March – The 42nd Vuelta a Colombia begins in Pereira, Risaralda.

=== April ===
- 12 April – The 42nd Vuelta a Colombia ends in Bogotá. Fabio Parra of Seguros Amaya wins.

=== May ===
- 2 May – The 1992 Colombian energy crisis begins.

=== June ===
- 3 June – Local municipal officials belonging to the Patriotic Union María Mercedes Méndez, William Ocampo Castaño, Rosa Peña Rodríguez, and Ernesto Sarralde and their driver, Armando Sandovaz, are targeted and killed in El Castillo, Meta.

=== July ===
- 22 July – President Gaviria announces that Pablo Escobar had escaped from La Catedral prison in Medellín.

=== August ===
- 5 August – Ximena Restrepo wins bronze for Colombia in the Women's 400-metres event at the Barcelona Summer Olympics.
- 16-30 August – The 1992 South American U-20 Championship is held in Medellín; Brazil wins, while Colombia comes in third.

=== September ===
- 18 September – Judge Miriam Rocío Vélez Pérez and two of the Administrative Department of Security (DAS) bodyguards assigned to her are assassinated by a group of men suspected to have been hired by Pablo Escobar. Judge Vélez was overseeing the murder case against Escobar of journalist Guillermo Cano Isaza in 1986. The previous judge in the case was also murdered, while two other past judges ended up fleeing the country.

=== October ===
- 9 October – Roberto Escobar, brother of Pablo Escobar, Juan Jairo Velasquez, and Otoniel Gonzalez of the Medellín Cartel surrender to Colombian authorities after escaping during a prison transfer along with 6 other Medellín Cartel lieutenants.
- 18 October – 1992 Murindó earthquake.

=== November ===
- 9 November – President Gaviria declares a national state of emergency.
- 15 November – Villatina massacre.
- 16 November – Miss Colombia 1992.

=== December ===
- 30 December – The Ministry of Transport is established.

=== Uncertain ===
- The Old Boots sculpture in Cartagena is demolished for the construction of the Heredia Bridge.

== Births ==
- 7 October – Karl Triana, baseball player.

== Deaths ==
- 11 April – Alejandro Obregón, artist (b. 1920).
- 5 November – Carlos Sanz de Santamaría (b. 1905).
