= 1996 in Colombia =

- Decades: 1970s; 1980s; 1990s; 2000s; 2010s
- See also: Other events of 1996; Timeline of Colombian history

Events of 1996 in Colombia.

== Incumbents ==
- President: Ernesto Samper (1994–1998).
- Vice President: Humberto de la Calle (1994–1997).

== Events ==
=== January ===
- 11 January – José Santacruz, drug lord and member of the Cali Cartel, escapes from La Picota prison in Bogotá.
- 30 January – President Samper calls a special Congress into session and admits that money tied to drug trafficking aided his 1994 election campaign, but insists he was deceived. He demands that Congress investigate the situation and himself to determine responsibility.

=== February ===
- 4 February – LAC Colombia Flight 028: A flight from Líneas Aéreas del Caribe (LAC), a Colombian airline, crashes near a soccer field in Mariano Roque Alonso, Paraguay, killing 4 people on board and 18 people on the ground, mostly children.

=== March ===
- 5 March – Drug lord José Santacruz Londoño is murdered while on the run.

=== April ===
- Juan Carlos Gaviria, brother of former president Caesar Gaviria, is kidnapped by the National Liberation Army's (ELN) Jorge Eliécer Gaitan Alianza (JEGA).

=== May ===
- 7 May – The president of the Patriotic Union (UP) party, Aida Abella, is attacked on the Autopista Norte Highway in Bogotá. Right-wing paramilitary groups and gangs who have conducted campaigns of violence against the UP, previously killing over 3,000 members, are suspected to be responsible. She manages to escape unharmed but flees to Switzerland a week later as a result of further threats to her life.

=== June ===
- Juan Carlos Gaviria is released by the National Liberation Army (ELN) in exchange for their safe passage to Cuba.
- 20 June –
  - Jesús Ángel González Arias, Governor of Caqueta, and his driver are murdered by the FARC in Porvenir, El Paujil while attempting to secure the release of kidnapped Congressperson Rodrigo Turbay Cote.
  - Pedro Malagón, member of the Patriotic Union, representative in the Departmental Assembly of Meta, and member of the Meta Civic Committee for Human Rights (Comité Cívico por los Derechos Humanos del Meta), and his 17 year old daughter Elda Milena Malagón Hernandez are murdered in Villavicencio, Meta following multiple death threats.

=== July ===
- President Samper signs Law 294, establishing acts of inter-familial violence, such as spousal rape, as crimes and resources/legal recourse for victims.

=== August ===
- 16 August – 3 people die and 20 people are injured in a crowd crush trying to get into a Shakira concert in Barranquilla.
- 30 August – Around 500 guerrillas belonging to the Southern Bloc of the Revolutionary Armed Forces of Colombia People's Army (FARC) attack Las Delicias military base in Puerto Leguízamo, Putumayo. During the attack, 27 National Army soldiers die, 60 are kidnapped, and 16 are wounded. 12 FARC members are also killed and 25 are injured.

=== September ===
- 2 September – President Samper announces that Ecopetrol has discovered oil in Medina, Cundinamarca.
- 4 September – The FARC attack a military base in Guaviare, three weeks of guerrilla warfare follow that kills over 130 people.
- 16 September over 25,000 residents of Facatativá, Cundinamarca protest over after many received increased energy bills, with rate increases as high as 300%.

=== October ===
- 4 October – José Luis Botero Henao, the parish priest of Venecia, Cundinamarca is murdered.
- 13 October – Josué Giraldo Cardona, human rights activist associated with the Patriotic Union and president of the Meta Civic Committee for Human Rights (Comité Cívico por los Derechos Humanos del Meta) is shot and killed outside his house in Villavicencio, Meta following multiple death threats.

=== November ===
- 5 November – The Colombian ambassador to the European Union (EU) resigns after the European Parliament passes a resolution that called for him to step down. This followed controversy over land he claimed as his property, of which 106 families were displaced from by violent paramilitaries earlier in the year.

=== December ===
- 31 December – A massacre is carried out by paramilitaries in Dabeiba, Antioquia; killing 11 people, including 2 llocal eaders of the indigenous Nendo people.

== Births ==
- 12 June – Davinson Sánchez, footballer.
- 22 October – Carlos Ramirez Rozo, Venezuelan-Colombian footballer.

== Deaths ==
- 5 March – José Santacruz, Cali Cartel drug trafficker (b. 1943).
- 20 June –
  - Jesús Ángel González Arias, politician, lawyer, and then Governor of Caquetá (b. 1955).
  - Pedro Malagón, politician.
- 4 October – José Luis Botero Henao, priest (b. 1963/1964).
- 13 October – Josué Giraldo Cardona, human rights activist.
