= Luis Antonio Escobar (composer) =

Colombian composer and musicologist

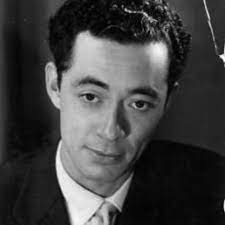
Luis Antonio Escobar

Luis Antonio Escobar (July 14, 1925 in Villapinzón, Cundinamarca – September 11, 1993 in Miami, Florida) was a Colombian composer and musicologist. He studied at the Bogotá Conservatory and then at the Peabody Institute in Maryland. Afterward he studied in Europe with Boris Blacher. Escobar was the Colombian consul in Bonn, West Germany, from 1967 to 1970 and was cultural attaché to the consulate in Miami in 1993. He is survived by his wife, pianist and composer Amparo Ángel.

He was the author, among other works, of Cántica de cantas colombianas (1960), for choir and orchestra, the opera for children La princesa y la arveja (1958), the opera Los hampones (1961), the ballet Avirama (1956) and Epitafio a Jorge Gaitán (1962). Other well known works by Escobar are his Piano Concerti 2 and 3, and Bambuquerías y Preludios.

In 1973 he co-founded El Muro Blanco, a cultural learning center in Bogota, with Andres Holguín. He won the national music prize awarded by Banco de Colombia in 1974. He has been recorded by Colombian ensembles. His work at times incorporated folk and traditional music of Colombia.
