= Association of Peasant Workers of the Carare =

Colombian peace organization (1987-)

- Asociación de Trabajadores Campesinos del Carare
- Formation: June 1987; 39 years ago
- Founded at: La India, Cimitarra, Colombia
- Legal status: Active
- Award: Right Livelihood Award
- Website: atccvidaypaz.org

The Association of Peasant Workers of the Carare (Spanish: Asociación de Trabajadores Campesinos del Carare, ATCC) is an organization that was founded in 1987 in the village of La India, part of the municipality of Cimitarra in north-east Colombia, as a reaction to the ongoing violence between various armed groups in the region. Despite the murder of several of its leaders, it has continued to fight for peace, and in 1990 it was awarded the Right Livelihood Award in recognition of its work.

== History ==
Following decades of fighting in the region between guerrilla groups and the Colombian army, later joined in the 1980s by paramilitary fighters, the community of La India had reached breaking point by 1987. A group of peasants asked for a meeting with the guerrillas which took place on May 21, 1987, and asked to be left in peace. The guerrillas accepted the request of the group, and a meeting the following week with the commander of the military forces achieved the same result. Following the meetings the ATCC was formed. Its aim was to promote economic growth and peace in the region by holding talks with all parties involved in the conflict, while avoiding taking sides. The ATCC obtained a government grant for six million pesos to build a community store and two purchase two canoes to provide transport to the area along the Carare River. The organization also developed a six-year plan, costing almost three thousand million pesos, to develop the region. The ATCC's plan covers six municipalities in the region and has five goals: to create a program of building a culture of peace and symbolic reparation; a health care and community rehabilitation plan; an agroforestry program to restore the environment and work for the community; a program of organizational strengthening and institutional recovery; and the restoration of collective property. The plan was finally approved on December 15, 2012.

The ATCC's greatest setback was the murder on February 26, 1990 of its co-founder and president Josué Vargas, its secretary Saúl Castañeda, and its technical advisor Miguel Ángel Barajas, along with London-based BBC journalist Silvia Duzán who had been interviewing them in a restaurant in Cimitarra. However, on October 8 of the same year the organization was awarded the Right Livelihood Award (popularly known as the "Alternative Nobel Prize") in recognition of its work in standing up to the violence.

During the 1990s the ATCC was involved in a struggle to convince local farmers not to accede to the demands of guerrilla groups and plant coca. Between 2001 and 2004 the organization also had to stand up to further outbreaks of violence that took place in the area.
