= Armero tragedy =

1985 volcanic eruption in Colombia

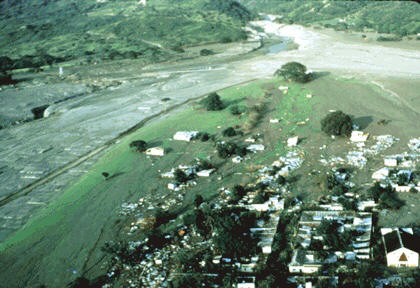
- Lahars covering the town of Armero
- Date: November 13, 1985
- Location: Nevado del Ruiz, Tolima, Colombia; 04°57′48″N 74°54′20″W
- Type: Lahars
- Cause: Volcanic eruption
- Deaths: 23,000+
- Injuries: 5,000 (approximate)
- Missing: 3,300

The Armero tragedy (Spanish: Tragedia de Armero [tɾaˈxeðja ðe aɾˈmeɾo]) occurred following the eruption of the Nevado del Ruiz stratovolcano in Tolima, Colombia, on November 13, 1985. The volcano's eruption after 69 years of dormancy caught nearby towns unprepared, even though volcanological organizations had warned the government to evacuate the area after they had detected volcanic activity two months earlier.

As pyroclastic flows erupted from the volcano's crater, they melted the mountain's glaciers, sending four enormous lahars (volcanically induced mudflows, landslides, and debris flows) down the slopes at 50 km/h (30 mph). The lahars picked up speed in gullies and engulfed the town of Armero, killing more than 20,000 of its almost 29,000 inhabitants. Casualties in other towns, particularly Chinchiná, brought the overall death toll to 23,000. Footage and photographs of Omayra Sánchez, a young victim of the disaster, were published around the world. Other photographs of the lahars and the impact of the disaster captured attention worldwide and led to controversy over the degree to which the Colombian government was responsible for the disaster. A banner at a mass funeral in Ibagué read, "The volcano didn't kill 22,000 people. The government killed them."

The relief efforts were hindered by the composition of the mud, which made it nearly impossible to move through without becoming stuck. By the time relief workers reached Armero twelve hours after the eruption, many of the victims with serious injuries were dead. The relief workers were horrified by the landscape of fallen trees, disfigured human bodies, and piles of debris from entire houses. It was the second-deadliest volcanic disaster of the 20th century, surpassed only by the 1902 eruption of Mount Pelée, and is the fourth-deadliest volcanic event recorded since 1500.

The event was a foreseeable catastrophe exacerbated by the populace's unawareness of the volcano's destructive history; geologists and other experts had warned authorities and media outlets about the danger in the weeks and days leading up to the eruption. Hazard maps for the vicinity were prepared but poorly distributed. On the day of the eruption, several evacuation attempts were made, but a severe storm restricted communications. Many victims stayed in their houses as they had been instructed, believing that the eruption had ended. The noise from the storm may have prevented many from hearing the sounds of the eruption until it was too late.

Nevado del Ruiz has erupted several times since 1985, and continues to threaten up to 500,000 people living along the Combeima, Chinchiná, Coello-Toche, and Guali river valleys. A lahar (or group of lahars) similar in size to the 1985 event might travel as far as 100 km (60 mi) from the volcano and could be triggered by a small eruption. To counter this threat, the Colombian government established a specialized office which administers the national system for identification, prevention, preparedness and management of natural disasters, the National Unit for Management of Disasters Risk (Sistema Nacional de Gestión del Riesgo de Desastres). The United States Geological Survey also created the Volcano Disaster Assistance Program and the Volcano Crisis Assistance Team, which evacuated roughly 75,000 people from the area around Mount Pinatubo before its 1991 eruption. All Colombian counties, by law, have a territorial plan that includes the identification of natural threats, treatment for building permits and preparedness for the prevention and management of natural disasters through planning programs which have helped save lives in many natural disasters since Armero's tragedy.

In 1988, three years after the eruption, Stanley Williams of Louisiana State University stated that, "With the possible exception of Mount St. Helens in the state of Washington, no other volcano in the Western Hemisphere is being watched so elaborately" as Nevado del Ruiz. Communities living near the volcano have become wary of volcanic activity: when it erupted in 1989, more than 2,300 people living around it were evacuated.

== Background ==
Armero, located 48 km (30 mi) from the Nevado del Ruiz volcano and 169 km (105 mi) from Colombia's capital of Bogotá, was the third largest town in Tolima Department, after the towns of Ibagué and Espinal. A prominent farming town before the eruption, it was responsible for roughly one-fifth of Colombia's rice production and for a large share of the cotton, sorghum, and coffee crops. Much of this prosperity can be attributed to Nevado del Ruiz, as the fertile volcanic soil stimulates agricultural growth.

Built on top of an alluvial fan that had been host to historic lahars, the town was previously destroyed by a volcanic eruption in 1595 and by mudflows in 1845. In the 1595 eruption, three distinct Plinian eruptions produced lahars that claimed the lives of 636 people. During the 1845 event, 1,000 people were killed by earthquake-generated mudflows near the Magdalena River.

Ruiz has undergone three distinct eruptive periods, the first beginning 1.8 million years ago. During the present period (beginning 11,000 years ago), it has erupted at least twelve times, producing ashfalls, pyroclastic flows, and lahars. The historically recorded eruptions have primarily involved a central vent eruption (in the caldera) followed by an explosive eruption, then the formation of lahars. Ruiz's earliest identified Holocene eruption was in about 6660 BC, and further eruptions occurred around 1245, 850, 200 BC, and in about 350, 675, in 1350, 1541 (perhaps), 1570, 1595, 1623, 1805, 1826, 1828 (perhaps), 1829, 1831, 1833 (perhaps), 1845, 1916, December 1984 through March 1985, 1987 through July 1991, and possibly in April 1994. Many of these eruptions involved a central vent eruption, a flank vent eruption, and a phreatic (steam) explosion. Ruiz is the second-most active volcano in Colombia after Galeras.

== 1985 activity ==
=== Precursor ===
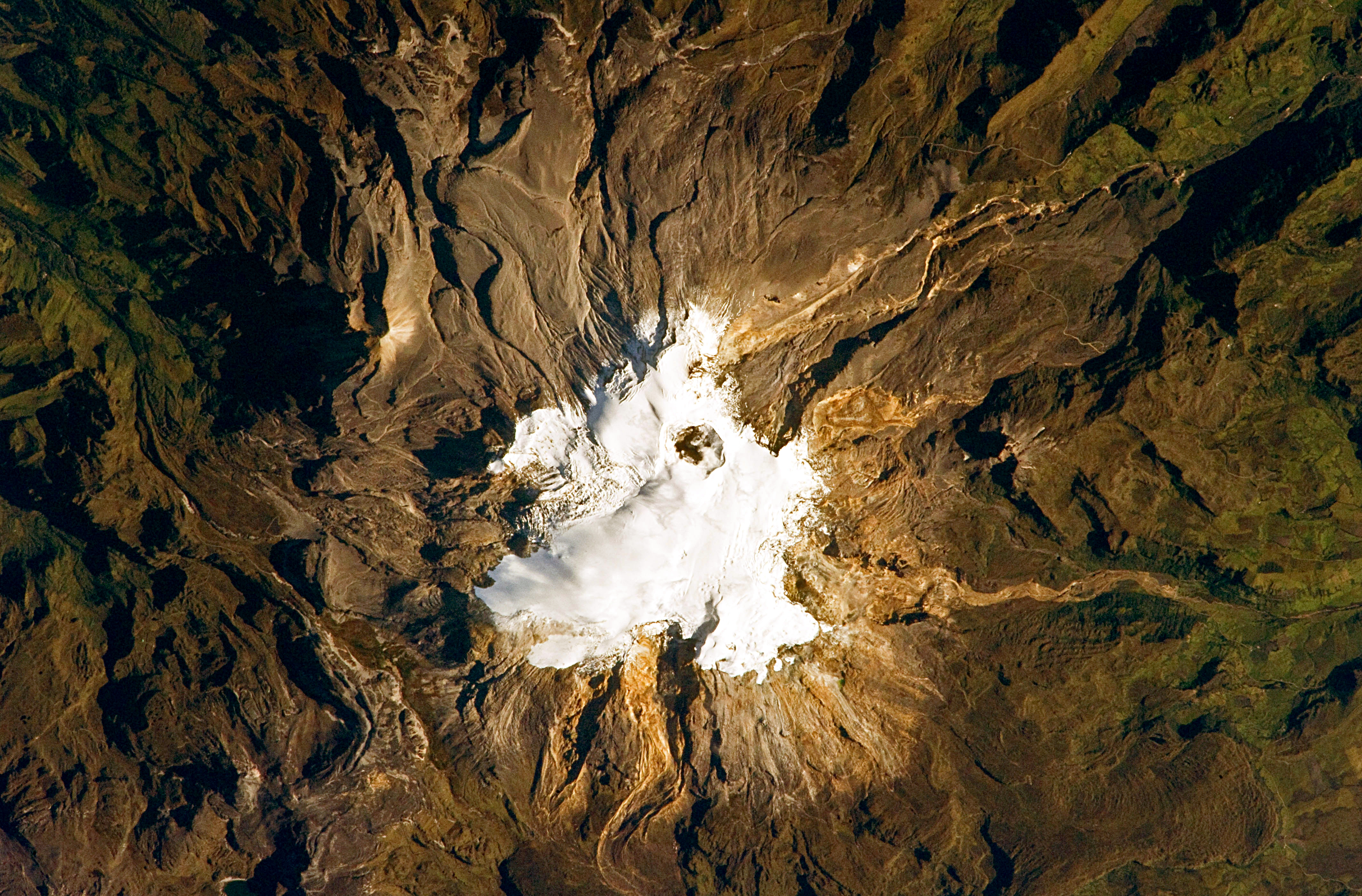
Nevado del Ruiz seen from space. The summit ice cap and glaciers surround the dark Arenas crater.

In late 1984, geologists noticed that seismic activity had begun to increase in the area around Nevado del Ruiz. Increased fumarole activity, deposition of sulfur on the summit of the volcano, and phreatic eruptions also alerted geologists to the possibility of an eruption. Phreatic events, when rising magma encounters water, continued well into September 1985 (one major event took place on September 11, 1985), shooting steam high into the air. Activity began to decline in October, probably because the new magma had finished ascending into Ruiz's volcanic edifice.

An Italian volcanological mission analyzed gas samples from fumaroles along the Arenas crater floor and found them to be a mixture of carbon dioxide and sulfur dioxide, indicating a direct release of magma into the surface environment. Publishing a report for government officials on October 22, 1985, the scientists determined that the risk of lahars was unusually high. To prepare for the eruption, the report gave several simple preparedness techniques to local authorities. Another team gave the local officials seismographs, but no instructions on how to operate them.

Volcanic activity increased again in November 1985 as magma neared the surface. Increasing quantities of gases rich in sulfur dioxide and elemental sulfur began to appear in the volcano. The water content of the fumaroles' gases decreased, and water springs in the vicinity of Ruiz became enriched with magnesium, calcium, and potassium, which leached from the magma.

The thermodynamic equilibration temperatures, corresponding to the chemical composition of the discharged gases, ranged from 200 to 600 °C (400 to 1,100 °F); this is a measure of the temperature at which the gases equilibrated within the volcano. The extensive degassing of the magma caused pressure to build up inside the volcano in the space above the magma, which eventually resulted in the explosive eruption.

=== Preparation and attempted evacuation ===
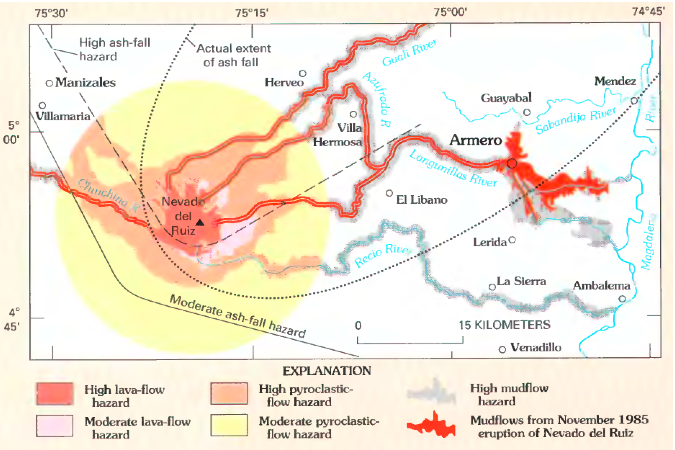
A recent hazard map prepared for Nevado del Ruiz and vicinity, showing all of the major disaster zones affected by the eruption

In September 1985, as earthquakes and phreatic eruptions rocked the area, local officials began planning for an evacuation. In October, a hazard map was finalized for the area around Ruiz. (Note: This was the first hazard map ever prepared for a Colombian volcano.) This map highlighted the danger from falling material—including ash and volcanic rock—near Murillo, Santa Isabel, and Libano, as well as the threat of lahars in Mariquita, Guayabal, Chinchiná and Armero.

The map was poorly distributed to the people at high risk from Ruiz: many survivors had never heard of it, even though several of the country's major newspapers featured versions of the map. Henry Villegas of INGEOMINAS (Colombian Institute of Mining and Geology) stated that the hazard maps clearly demonstrated that Armero would be affected by lahars, but that the map "met with strong opposition from economic interests". He added that because the map was not prepared long before the eruption, mass production and distribution of it in time was difficult.

At least one of the hazard maps, published in the prominent El Espectador newspaper in Bogotá, included glaring errors. Without proper graphic scaling, it was unclear how big the map's hazard zones really were. The lahars on the map did not have a distinct ending point, and the main threat seemed to be from pyroclastic flows, not from mudflows. Though the map was colored blue, green, red, and yellow, there was no key to indicate what each color represented, and Armero was located in the green zone, wrongly interpreted to indicate the safest area. Another map published by the El Tiempo newspaper featured illustrations which "gave a perception of topography to the public unfamiliar with maps, allowing them to relate hazard zones to the landscape". In spite of this presentation that was keyed to the audience, the map ended up a more artistic representation of the risk than a purely scientific one.

The day of the eruption, black ash columns erupted from Ruiz at approximately 3:00 p.m. local time. The local civil defense director was promptly alerted to the situation. He contacted INGEOMINAS, which ruled that the area should be evacuated; he was then told to contact the civil defense directors in Bogotá and Tolima. Between 5:00–7:00 p.m., the ash stopped falling, and local officials, including the town priest, instructed people to "stay calm" and go inside. Around 5:00 p.m. an emergency committee meeting was called, and when it ended at 7:00 p.m., several members contacted the regional Red Cross over the intended evacuation efforts at Armero, Mariquita, and Honda.

The Ibagué Red Cross contacted Armero's officials and ordered an evacuation, which was not carried out because of electrical problems caused by a storm. The storm's heavy rain and constant thunder may have overpowered the noise of the volcano, and with no systematic warning efforts, the residents of Armero were completely unaware of the continuing activity at Ruiz. At 9:45 p.m., after the volcano had erupted, civil defense officials from Ibagué and Murillo tried to warn Armero's officials, but could not make contact. Later they overheard conversations between individual officials of Armero and others; a few heard the mayor of Armero speaking on a ham radio, saying "that he did not think there was much danger" just before he was overtaken by the lahar.

=== Eruption ===
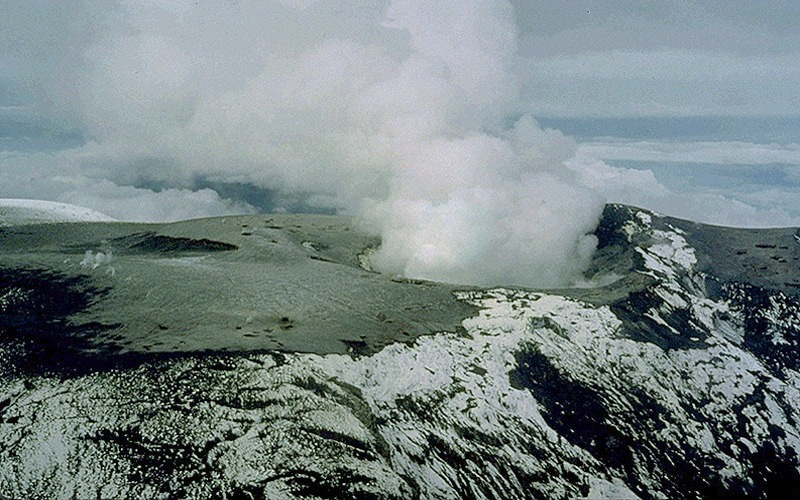
The summit of Nevado del Ruiz in late November 1985

At 9:09 p.m., on November 13, 1985, Nevado del Ruiz ejected dacitic tephra more than 30 km (20 mi) into the atmosphere. The total mass of the erupted material (including magma) was 35 million metric tons, only three percent of the amount that erupted from Mount St. Helens in 1980. The eruption reached 3 on the Volcanic Explosivity Index. The mass of the ejected sulfur dioxide was about 700,000 metric tons, or about two percent of the mass of the erupted solid material, making the eruption unusually sulfur rich.

The eruption produced pyroclastic flows that melted summit glaciers and snow, generating four thick lahars that raced down river valleys on the volcano's flanks, destroying a small lake that was observed in Arenas' crater several months before the eruption. Water in such volcanic lakes tends to be extremely salty, and may contain dissolved volcanic gases. The lake's hot, acidic water significantly accelerated the melting of the ice, an effect confirmed by the large amounts of sulfates and chlorides found in the lahar flow.

The lahars, formed of water, ice, pumice, and other rocks, incorporated clay from eroding soil as they traveled down the volcano's flanks. They ran down the volcano's sides at an average speed of 60 km/h (40 mph), dislodging rock and destroying vegetation. After descending thousands of meters down the side of the volcano, the lahars followed the six river valleys leading from the volcano, where they grew to almost four times their original volume. In the Gualí River, a lahar reached a maximum width of 50 m (160 ft).

Survivors in Armero described the night as "quiet". Volcanic ash had been falling throughout the day, but residents were informed it was nothing to worry about. Later in the afternoon, ash began falling again after a long period of quiet. Local radio stations reported that residents should remain calm and ignore the material. One survivor reported going to the fire department to be informed that the ash was "nothing".

During the night, the electrical power suddenly turned off and the radios went silent. Just before 11:30 p.m., a huge stream of water swept through Armero; it was powerful enough to flip cars and pick up people. A loud roar could be heard from the mountain, but the residents were panicked over what they believed to be a flood.

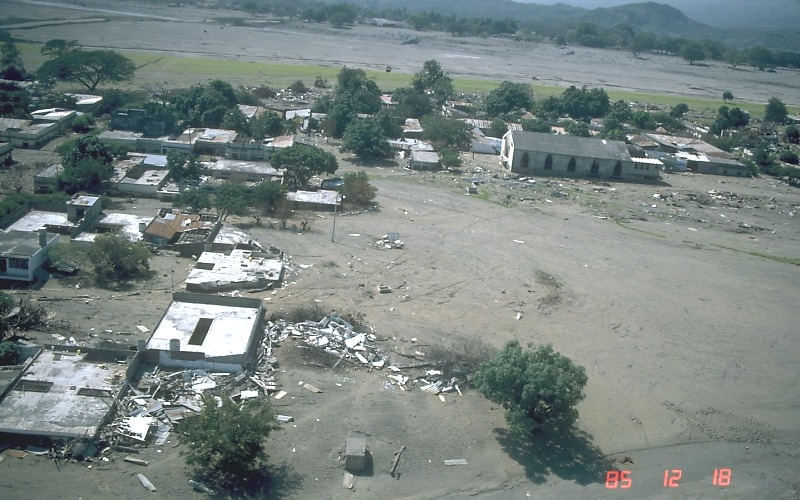
Armero after the eruption, December 1985

At 11:30 p.m., the first lahar hit, followed shortly by the others. One of the lahars virtually erased Armero; three-quarters of the town's 28,700 inhabitants were killed. Proceeding in three major waves, this lahar was 30 m (100 ft) deep, moved at 12 m/s (39 ft/s; 27 mph), and lasted ten to twenty minutes. Traveling at about 6 m/s (20 ft/s; 13 mph), the second lahar lasted thirty minutes and was followed by smaller pulses. A third major pulse brought the lahar's duration to roughly two hours. By that point, 85 percent of Armero was enveloped in mud. Survivors described people holding on to debris from their homes in attempts to stay above the mud. Buildings collapsed, crushing people and raining down debris.

The front of the lahar contained boulders and cobbles that would have crushed anyone in their path, while the slower parts were dotted by fine, sharp stones which caused lacerations. Mud moved into open wounds and other open body parts — the eyes, ears, and mouth — and placed pressure capable of inducing traumatic asphyxia in one or two minutes upon people buried in it. Martí and Ernst state in their work Volcanoes and the Environment that they believe that many who survived the lahars succumbed to their injuries as they were trapped, or contracted hypothermia, though the latter is unlikely, given that survivors described the water as warm.

Another lahar, which descended through the valley of the Chinchiná River, killed about 1,800 people and destroyed 400 homes in Chinchiná. In total, more than 23,000 people were killed, approximately 5,000 were injured, and 5,000 homes throughout thirteen villages were destroyed. Some 230,000 people were affected, 11,000 ha (27,000 acres) were disrupted, and there were nearly 20,000 survivor-refugees. The Armero tragedy, as the event came to be known, was the second-deadliest volcanic disaster of the 20th century, surpassed only by the 1902 eruption of Mount Pelée, and is the fourth-deadliest volcanic eruption recorded since 1500 AD. It is also the deadliest lahar, and Colombia's worst natural disaster.

=== Impact ===
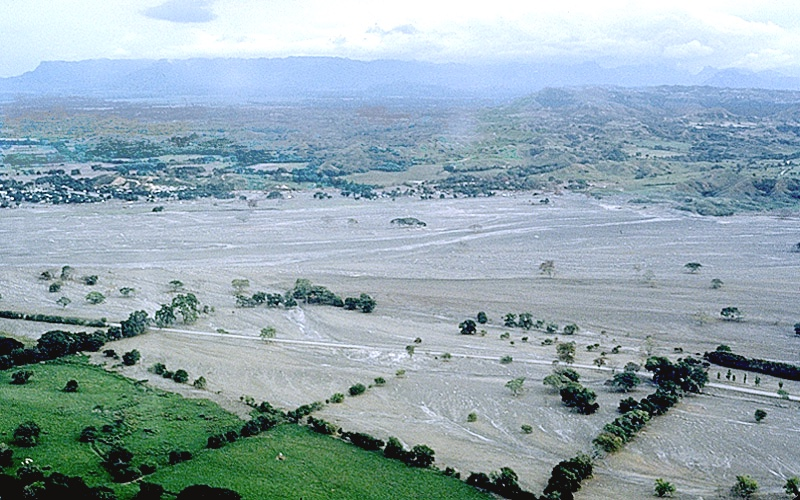
Armero was located in the center of this photograph, taken in late November 1985

The loss of life was exacerbated by the lack of an accurate timeframe for the eruption and the unwillingness of local authorities to take costly preventative measures without clear signs of imminent danger. Because its last substantial eruption had occurred 140 years earlier, it was difficult for many to accept the danger presented by the volcano; locals even called it the "Sleeping Lion".

Hazard maps showing that Armero would be completely flooded after an eruption were distributed more than a month before the eruption, but the Colombian Congress criticized the scientific and civil defense agencies for scaremongering. The eruption occurred at the height of guerrilla warfare in Bogotá, and so the government and army were occupied at the time of the eruption.

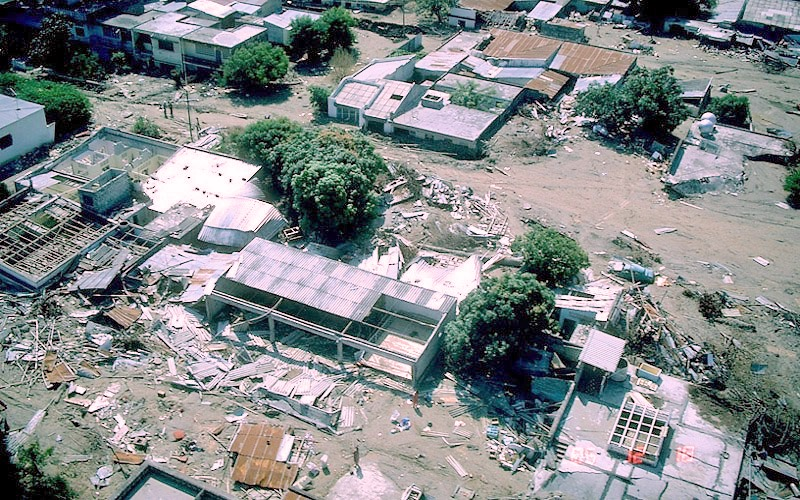
Only a few buildings and structures remained standing after the mud and debris flows ravaged the town of Armero

The day after the eruption, relief workers in Armero were appalled at its impact. The lahars had left behind a gray mass which covered the entire town, which was dotted with broken trees and horribly disfigured bodies. Debris from huts and homes protruded from beneath the gray mud. A few bags filled with crops were discovered in the mud. Workers described an acrid smell of "rotting bodies, ... wood smoke and decaying vegetables". To the horror of these workers, who were scrambling to begin relief efforts, survivors let out moans of pain and agony. The damages were assessed at one billion dollars, approximately 2% of Colombia's 1985 gross national product.

As news of the catastrophe spread around the world, the ongoing Colombian presidential campaign was halted, and the guerrilla fighters stopped their campaign "in view of the painful tragedy that has befallen our nation". Tickets for Colombian national championship soccer games added a surcharge of five cents to go to relief efforts.

Scientists who later analyzed the seismograph data noticed that several long-period earthquakes (which begin strongly and then slowly die out) had occurred in the final hours before the eruption. Volcanologist Bernard Chouet said that "the volcano was screaming, 'I'm about to explode'", but the scientists who were studying Ruiz at the time of the eruption were not able to read the signal.

== Relief efforts ==
The Nevado del Ruiz eruption occurred two months after the 1985 Mexico City earthquake, limiting the amount of supplies that could be sent to each of the disasters. Efforts were organized in Ibagué and Bogotá for Armero and in Cali for Chinchiná, where medical teams gathered. Makeshift triage stations were established in Lerida, Guayabal, and Mariquita, and soon were overwhelmed with the sheer number of victims. The remaining victims were directed to Ibagué's hospitals, as local institutions had already been destroyed or were at risk from further lahars.

The US government spent over $1 million in aid (equivalent to $3 million today), and U.S. Ambassador Charles A. Gillespie, Jr. donated an initial $25,000 to Colombian disaster assistance institutions ($75,000 today). The Office of Foreign Disaster Assistance of the United States Agency for International Development (USAID) sent one member of the United States Geological Survey (USGS), along with an USAID disaster relief expert and twelve helicopters, with support and medical personnel from Panama. The US subsequently sent additional aircraft and supplies, including 500 tents, 2,250 blankets, and several tent repair kits.

Twenty-four other nations contributed to the rescue and assistance of survivors. Ecuador supplied a mobile hospital, and Iceland's Red Cross sent $4,650 ($13,900 today). The French government sent their own medical supplies with 1,300 tents. Japan sent $1.25 million ($3.74 million today), along with eight doctors, nurses, and engineers, plus $50,000 ($149,700 today) to the United Nations for relief efforts. Another $50,000 ($149,700 today) was donated by the Lions Clubs International Foundation.

Rescue efforts were hindered by the soft mud that was up to 4.6 m (15 ft) deep in some places, making it virtually impossible for anyone to traverse it without sinking in. To make the situation worse, the highway connected to Armero and several bridges to it had been demolished by the lahars. It took twelve hours for the first survivors to be rescued, so those with serious but treatable injuries probably died before the rescuers arrived.

Because Armero's hospital was destroyed in the eruption, helicopters moved survivors to nearby hospitals. Six local towns set up makeshift emergency relief clinics, consisting of treatment areas and shelters for the homeless. To help with the treatment, physicians and rescue teams came from all over the country. Of the 1,244 patients spread over the clinics, 150 died from infection or associated complications. Had antibiotics been readily available and all of their lacerations been thoroughly cleaned, many of these people could have been saved.

One week after the disaster, rescue efforts began to cease. Nearly 4,000 relief workers and rescue team members were still searching for survivors, with little hope of finding any. By then, the official death toll was registered at 22,540 people; additional counts showed that 3,300 were missing, 20,000 homeless, and 4,000 injured. Looters raided the ruins and survivors faced concerns of typhus and yellow fever. For most of the relief workers, their job was over.

The eruption was used as an example for psychiatric recuperation after natural disasters by Robert Desjarlais and Leon Eisenberg in their work World Mental Health: Problems and Priorities in Low-Income Countries. The authors were concerned that only initial treatment for the survivors' psychological trauma was conducted. One study showed that the victims of the eruption suffered from anxiety and depression, which can lead to alcohol abuse, marital problems and other social issues. Rafael Ruiz, a National Army major who briefly served as Armero's provisional mayor after the disaster, stated that there were survivors who, due to the trauma of the event, were "jittery", experienced "nightmares", and suffered from "emotional problems". He added that the progress made by Christmas of 1985 was considerable, but that there was "still a long way to go".

== Aftermath ==
A lack of preparation for the disaster contributed to the high death toll. Armero had been built on an alluvial fan that had been overrun by historic mudflows; authorities had ignored a hazard-zone map that showed the potential damage to the town from lahars. Residents stayed inside their dwellings to avoid the falling ash, as local officials had instructed them to do, not thinking that they might be buried by the mudflows.

The disaster gained international notoriety due in part to a photograph taken by photographer Frank Fournier of a young girl named Omayra Sánchez, who was trapped beneath rubble for three days before she died. Following the eruption, relief workers gathered around the girl, speaking with her and listening to her responses. She attracted the attention of the reporters at the site because of her sense of dignity and courage, and caused controversy when people wondered why the photographer had not saved her (which was impossible without equipment). An appeal to the government for a pump to lower the water around Sánchez was left unanswered, and she succumbed to gangrene and hypothermia after sixty hours of being trapped. Her death epitomized the tragic nature of the Armero disaster – she could have been saved had the government responded promptly and addressed the concerns over the volcano's potency. The photograph earned the World Press Photo of the Year for "capturing the event of greatest journalistic importance".

Two photographers from the Miami Herald won a Pulitzer Prize for photographing the effects of the lahar. Stanley Williams of Louisiana State University said that following the eruption, "With the possible exception of Mount St. Helens in the state of Washington, no other volcano in the Western Hemisphere is being watched so elaborately." In response to the eruption, the USGS Volcano Crisis Assistance Team was formed in 1986, and the Volcano Disaster Assistance Program. The volcano erupted several more times between 1985 and 1994.

=== Anger over government negligence ===
Concerns over the alleged negligence of local officials to alert locals of the volcano's threat led to controversy. The mayor of Armero, Ramon Rodriguez, and other local officials had tried to bring the volcano's potential eruption to the attention of the Colombian government, but to no avail. For months, Rodriguez appealed to various officials, including congressmen and the governor of Tolima, Eduardo Alzate Garcia. Rodriguez once referred to the volcano as a "time bomb" and told reporters that he believed an eruption would disrupt the natural dam above Armero, resulting in floods.

Despite Rodriguez' persistence, only one congressman managed to inquire about the reality of the situation. Reports from the Colombian Minister of Mines, Iván Duque Escobar, the Minister of Defense, and Minister of Public Works "all asserted that the government was aware of the risk from the volcano and was acting to protect the population". The lack of responsibility for the disaster prompted lawmakers to campaign for Garcia to resign. In the media, similar thoughts and questions were hotly debated. One of the most aggressive campaigns came from a mass funeral in Ibagué for the victims, claiming that "The volcano didn't kill 22,000 people. The government killed them."

== Legacy ==
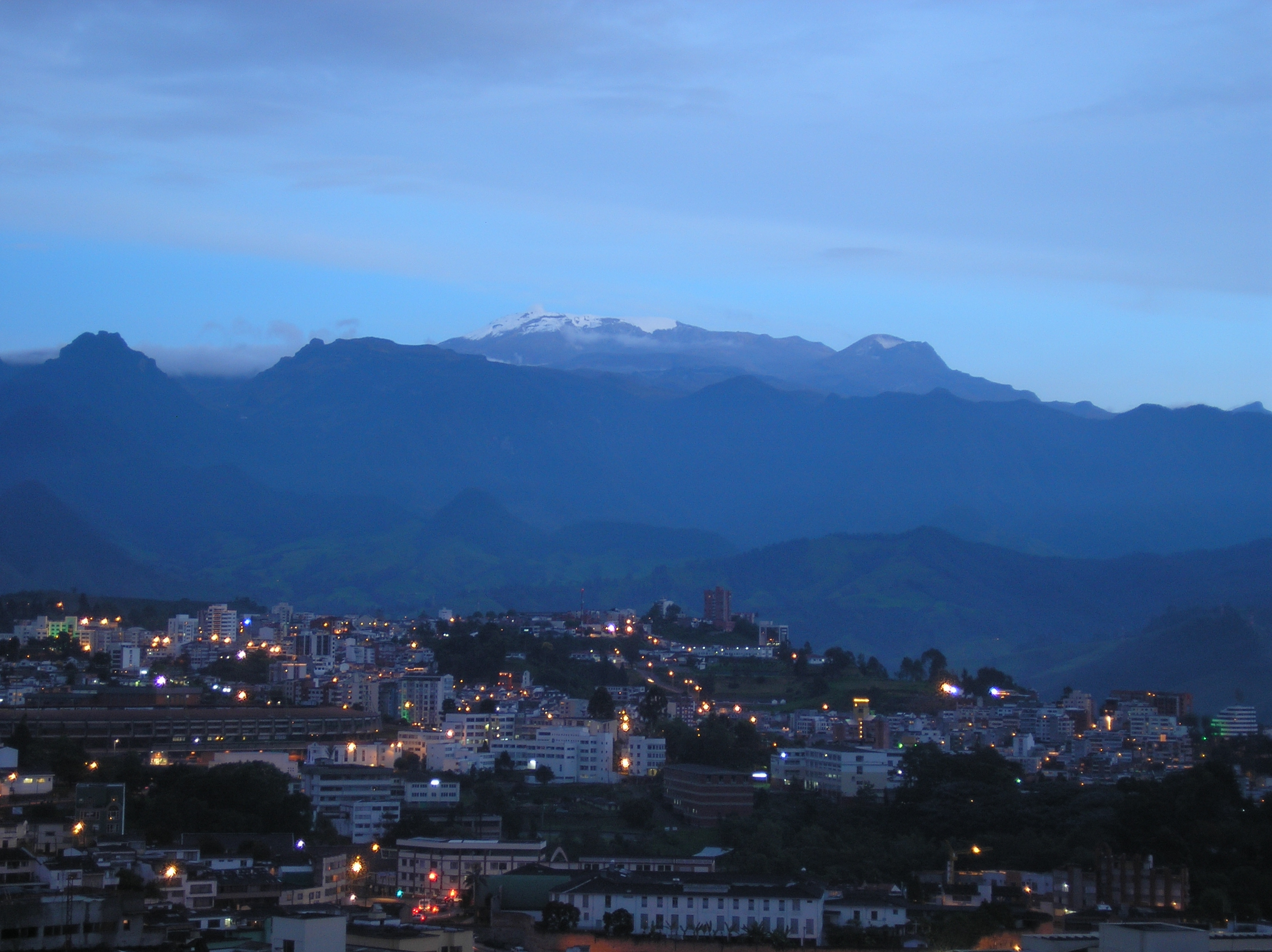
Nevado del Ruiz seen from Manizales, 2006

Nevado del Ruiz continues to pose a serious threat to nearby towns and villages. Of the threats, the one with the most potential for danger is that of small-volume eruptions, which can destabilize glaciers and trigger lahars. Although much of the volcano's glacier mass has retreated, a significant volume of ice still sits atop Ruiz and other volcanoes in the Ruiz–Tolima massif. Melting just ten percent of the ice would produce lahars with a volume of up to 200×10^{6} m^{3} (7.1×10^{9} cu ft) – similar to the lahar that destroyed Armero in 1985. In just hours, these lahars can travel up to 100 km (60 mi) along river valleys.

Estimates show that up to 500,000 people living in the Combeima, Chinchiná, Coello-Toche, and Guali valleys are at risk, with 100,000 individuals being considered to be at high risk. Lahars pose a threat to the nearby towns of Honda, Mariquita, Chinchiná, Ambalema, Herveo, Villa Hermosa, Puerto Salgar and La Dorada. Although small eruptions are more likely, the two-million-year eruptive history of the Ruiz–Tolima massif includes numerous large eruptions, indicating that the threat of a large eruption cannot be ignored. A large eruption would have more widespread effects, including the potential closure of Bogotá's airport due to ashfall.

As the Armero tragedy was exacerbated by the lack of early warnings, unwise land use, and the unpreparedness of nearby communities, the Colombian government created a special program, the Oficina Nacional para la Atención de Desastres (National Office for Disaster Preparedness), now known as the Dirección de Prevención y Atención de Desastres (Directorate for Disaster Prevention and Preparedness) – to prevent such incidents in the future.

All Colombian cities were directed to promote prevention planning to mitigate the consequences of natural disasters, and evacuations due to volcanic hazards have been carried out. About 2,300 people living along five nearby rivers were evacuated when Nevado del Ruiz erupted again in 1989. When another Colombian volcano, Nevado del Huila, erupted in April 2008, thousands of people were evacuated because volcanologists worried that the eruption could be another "Nevado del Ruiz".

The lessons from the Armero tragedy have inspired a lahar warning system for Mt. Rainier in Washington State, which has a similar potential for lahars.

=== Commemorations ===
A little less than one year later, Pope John Paul II flew over Armero and then visited Lérida's refugee camps with President Betancur. He spoke about the disaster and declared the site of Armero "holy land". Although many victims of the disaster were commemorated, Omayra Sánchez in particular was immortalized by poems, novels, and music pieces. One work (Adios, Omayra) by Eduardo Santa illustrated the girl's last days of life and her symbolism of the catastrophe. Survivors were also recognized in Germán Santa María Barragán's dramatized television special titled "No Morirás" (You Will Not Die). Much of the cast was composed of victims of the tragedy who appeared at the cast calls to be extras.

==== Media ====
- The 1994 television series El Oasis, starring Pedro Rendón and Shakira, tells the story of a romance between two survivors of the Armero tragedy. It was produced by Cenpro TV for Canal A.
- The 1999 Colombian film Soplo de vida (Breath of life), directed by Luis Ospina, tells the story in the context of the Armero tragedy and in which the protagonists are survivors.
- Armero, a film about the tragedy directed by Christian Mantilla, was released on September 21, 2017.

== See also ==
- Vargas tragedy – a similarly catastrophic debris flow event caused by torrential rains in Venezuela in 1999

== Notes ==
=== Sources ===
- Desjarlais, Robert & Eisenberg, Leon (1996). World Mental Health: Problems and Priorities in Low-Income Countries. Oxford University Press US. ISBN 978-0-19-509540-1.
- Martí, Joan & Ernst, Gerald (2005). Volcanoes and the Environment. Cambridge University Press. ISBN 978-0-521-59254-3.
- Mileti, Dennis S.; Bolton, Patricia A.; Fernandez, Gabriel; Updike, Randall G. (1991). The Eruption of Nevado Del Ruiz Volcano Colombia, South America, November 13, 1985. Washington, D.C.: Commission on Engineering and Technical Systems (National Academy Press). ISBN 978-0-309-04477-6.
- Villegas, Henry (September 2003). "Display of the Nevado del Ruiz Volcanic Hazard Map Using GIS" (PDF). Geocarto International. 18 (3). Geocarto International Centre: 5–13. Bibcode:2003GeoIn..18....5V. doi:10.1080/10106040308542276. S2CID 131190497. Archived from the original (PDF) on July 21, 2011.
