= Omayra Sánchez =

Colombian volcano victim (1972–1985)

- Frank Fournier's photograph of Sánchez
- Born: Omayra Sánchez Garzón; August 28, 1972; Armero, Tolima, Colombia
- Died: November 16, 1985 (aged 13); Armero, Tolima, Colombia
- Cause of death: Killed by the volcanic eruption of Nevado del Ruiz
- Parents: Alvaro Enrique Sánchez; Maria Aleida Garzón

Omayra Sánchez Garzón (August 28, 1972 – November 16, 1985) was a Colombian girl trapped and killed by a landslide when she was 13 years old.

The landslide was caused by the 1985 eruption of the volcano Nevado del Ruiz in Armero, Tolima. Volcanic debris mixed with ice to form massive lahars (volcanically induced mudflows, landslides, and debris flows), which rushed into the river valleys below the mountain, killing about 25,000 people and destroying Armero and 13 other villages.

After the lahar demolished her home, Sánchez was trapped beneath the debris of her house, where she remained in water for three days, as rescue workers did not have any way to render life-saving medical care if they amputated her hopelessly pinned legs. Her plight was documented by journalists as she transformed from calmness into agony while relief workers tried to comfort her. After 60 hours of struggling, she died, likely as a result of either gangrene or hypothermia. Her death highlighted the failure of officials to respond correctly to the threat of the volcano.

A photograph of Sánchez taken by the photojournalist Frank Fournier shortly before she died was published in news outlets around the world. It was later designated the World Press Photo of the Year for 1986. Sánchez has been remembered in music, literature, and commemorative articles.

== Background ==
On November 13, 1985, the volcano Nevado del Ruiz erupted. At 9:09 pm, pyroclastic flows exploding from the crater melted the mountain's icecap, forming lahars which cascaded into river valleys below. One lahar, consisting of three pulses, did most of the damage. Traveling at 6 meters (20 ft) per second (~13.5 miles per hour, ~22 km/h), the first pulse enveloped most of the town of Armero, killing as many as 20,000 people; the two later pulses weakened buildings. Another lahar killed 1,800 people in nearby Chinchiná. In total 23,000 people were killed and 13 villages in addition to Armero were destroyed.

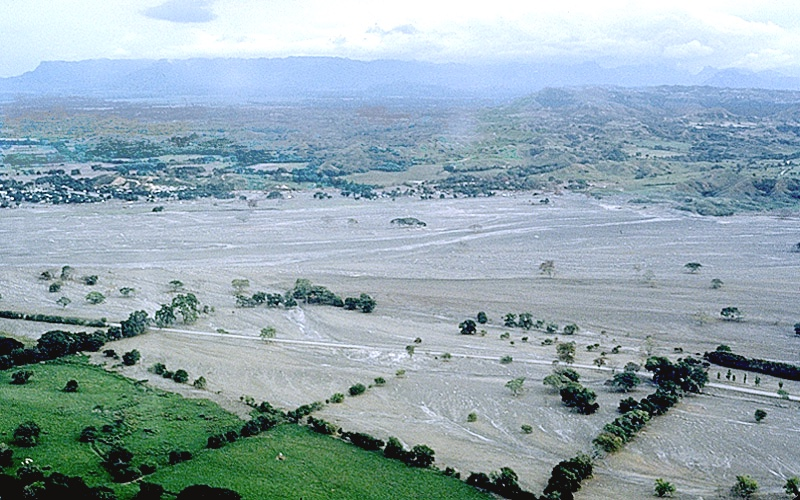
Formerly in the center of this area, the town of Armero was buried by thick volcanic mudflows in 1985.

Loss of life was exacerbated by the authorities' failure to take costly preventive measures in the absence of clear signs of imminent danger. There had been no substantial eruption of the volcano since 1845, which contributed to complacency; locals called the volcano the "Sleeping Lion".

During September 1985, as earthquakes and phreatic eruptions rocked the area around the volcano, officials began planning for evacuation. A hazard map was prepared in October; (Note: This was the first hazard map ever prepared for a Colombian volcano.) it highlighted the danger from falling ash and rock near Murillo, Santa Isabel, and Líbano, as well as the threat of lahars in Mariquita, Guayabal, Chinchiná, and Armero. The map was poorly distributed to those at greatest risk: many survivors said they had not known of it, though several major newspapers had featured it. Henry Villegas of the Colombian Institute of Mining and Geology stated that the maps clearly demonstrated Armero would be affected by the lahars, but were "met with strong opposition from economic interests". He said that the short time between the map's preparation and the eruption hindered timely distribution.

The Colombian Congress criticised scientific and civil defense agencies for scaremongering, and the government and army were preoccupied with a guerrilla campaign in Bogotá, the national capital.

The death toll was increased by the lack of early warnings, unwise land use, as villages were built in the likely path of lahars, and the lack of preparedness in communities near the volcano. Colombia's worst natural disaster, the Armero tragedy (as it came to be known) was the second-deadliest volcanic disaster of the 20th century (surpassed only by the 1902 eruption of Mount Pelée). It was the fourth-deadliest eruption recorded since 1500 AD. Its lahars were the deadliest in volcanic history.

== Life ==
Omayra Sánchez lived in the neighborhood of Santander with her parents Álvaro Enrique, a rice and sorghum collector, and María Aleida, along with her brother Álvaro Enrique and aunt María Adela Garzón. Prior to the eruption, her mother had traveled to Bogotá on business. On the night of the disaster, Omayra and her family were awake, worrying about the ashfall from the eruption, when they heard the sound of an approaching lahar. After it hit, Omayra became trapped under her home's concrete and other debris and could not free herself. When rescue teams tried to help her, they realized that her legs were trapped under her house's roof with her dead aunt's arms tightly clutched around her. Sources differ as to the degree to which Sánchez was trapped. Zeiderman (2009) said she was "trapped up to her neck", while Barragán (1987) said that she was trapped up to her waist.

For the first few hours after the mudflow hit, she was covered by concrete but got her hand through a crack in the debris. After a rescuer noticed her hand protruding from a pile of debris, he and others cleared tiles and wood during the course of a day. Once the girl was freed from the waist up, her rescuers attempted to pull her out, but found the task impossible without breaking her legs in the process. Each time a person pulled her, the water pooled around her, rising so that it seemed she would drown if they let her go, so rescue workers placed a tire around her body to keep her afloat. Divers discovered that Sánchez's legs were caught under a door made of bricks, with her dead aunt's arms clutched tightly around her legs and feet.

== Death ==
Colombia and half of the world remained with the bitter sensation that Omayra Sánchez could have been able to continue living after remaining for almost 60 hours trapped from head to toe amidst the rubble of Armero. Her face, her words, and her courage, which streamed throughout the world on television and were a heartbreaking image in the largest newspapers and magazines of the United States and Europe, remained a testimony of accusation against those who could have at the very least made the tragedy less serious.

Germán Santa María Barragán in El Tiempo, November 23, 1985

Despite her predicament, Sánchez remained relatively positive: she sang to Germán Santa María Barragán, a journalist who was working as a volunteer, asked for sweet food, drank soda, and agreed to be interviewed. At times, she was scared, and prayed or cried. On the third night, Sánchez began hallucinating, saying that she did not want to be late for school, and mentioned a math exam. Near the end of her life, Sánchez's eyes reddened, her face swelled, and her hands whitened. At one point she asked the people to leave her so they could rest. Hours later the workers returned with a pump and tried to save her, but her legs were bent under the concrete as if she was kneeling, and it was impossible to free her without severing her legs. Lacking the surgical equipment to save her from the effects of an amputation, the doctors present agreed that it would be more humane to let her die. In all, Sánchez suffered for nearly three nights (roughly 60 hours) before she died at approximately 10:05 A.M. on November 16 from exposure, most likely from gangrene or hypothermia.

Her brother survived the lahars; her father and aunt died. Her mother expressed her feelings about Omayra's death: "It is horrible, but we have to think about the living ... I will live for my son, who only lost a finger."

As the public became aware of Sánchez's situation through the media, her death became used as a symbol of the failure of officials to properly assist victims who allegedly could have been saved. Controversy began after descriptions of shortages of equipment were released in newspapers, disproving what officials had previously indicated: that they had used the best of their supplies. Volunteer relief workers said that there was such a lack of resources that supplies as basic as shovels, cutting tools, and stretchers were exhausted. The rescue process was impeded by large crowds and disorganization. An unnamed police officer said that the government should have depended on human resources to alleviate the problems and that the system of rescue was disorganized. Colombia's Minister of Defense, Miguel Uribe, said he "understood criticism of the rescue effort", but said that Colombia was "an undeveloped country" that did not "have that kind of equipment".

== Photograph ==
Frank Fournier, a French reporter who landed in Bogotá on November 15, took a photograph of Sánchez during her final hours, titled "The Agony of Omayra Sánchez". When he reached Armero at dawn on the 16th, a farmer directed him to Sánchez, who by then had been trapped for nearly three days and was nearly deserted. Fournier later described the town as "very haunting," with "eerie silence" punctuated by screaming. He said that he took the photograph feeling that he could only "report properly on the courage and the suffering and the dignity of the little girl" in his attempt to publicize the disaster's need for relief efforts, feeling otherwise "powerless".

At the time, there was international awareness of the disaster and the controversy concerning responsibility for the destructive aftermath. The image of Sanchez captured international attention. According to an unnamed BBC reporter, "Many were appalled at witnessing so intimately what transpired to be the last few hours of Omayra's life". After the photo was published in Paris Match, many accused Fournier of being "a vulture". He responded,

I felt the story was important for me to report and I was happier that there was some reaction; it would have been worse if people had not cared about it. ... I believe the photo helped raise money from around the world in aid and helped highlight the irresponsibility and lack of courage of the country's leaders.

The picture later won the World Press Photo of the Year for 1986.

== Legacy ==
The Armero catastrophe happened soon after the M-19 guerrilla group's raid and subsequent Palace of Justice siege on November 6, worsening an already chaotic situation. After Sánchez's death, the Colombian government was blamed for its inaction and general indifference to warning signs prior to the volcano's eruption.

The volcano Nevado del Ruiz is still active, according to the Volcano Watch Center in Colombia. Melting only 10 percent of the ice would produce mudflows with a volume of as much as 200,000,000 cubic meters (7.06×10^{9} cu ft)—similar to the mudflow that destroyed Armero in 1985. Such lahars can travel up to 100 kilometers (62 mi) along river valleys in a few hours. Estimates show that up to 500,000 people living in the Combeima, Chinchiná, Coello-Toche, and Guali valleys are at risk, and 100,000 of these are considered to be at high risk. The city of Armero no longer exists. The site was commemorated as a memorial with Christian crosses and a small monument to Sánchez.

During the years after the eruption, Sánchez was commemorated repeatedly, especially by newspapers like El Tiempo. Many victims of the disaster were commemorated, but Sánchez in particular has attracted lasting attention in popular poetry, novels, and music.

For example, a punk rock band formed in Chile in 2008 named themselves Omayra Sánchez; they express their "discontent that they feel with the negligence on the part of the people who in this day and age run the world". Adiós, Omayra: La catástrofe de Armero (1988), written by Eduardo Santa as a response to the eruption, depicts the girl's last days of life in detail and cites her in its introduction as an eternal symbol of the catastrophe. In No Morirás (1994), Germán Santa María Barragán writes that of all the horrors he saw at Armero, nothing was more painful than seeing the face of Omayra Sánchez under the ruins of her house. Isabel Allende's short story, "And of Clay Are We Created" ("De barro estamos hechos"), is told from the perspective of a reporter who tries to help a girl trapped under the fireplace of her ruined home. Allende later wrote, "Her [Sánchez's] big black eyes, filled with resignation and wisdom, still pursue me in my dreams. Writing the story failed to exorcise her ghost."

To try to prevent repetition of such a disaster, the government of Colombia created the Oficina Nacional para la Atención de Desastres (National Office for Disaster Preparedness), now known as the Dirección de Prevención y Atención de Desastres (Directorate for Disaster Prevention and Preparedness). All Colombian cities were directed to plan for natural disasters.

A species of cricket found in the region of the Armero tragedy was newly described during 2020 and named Gigagryllus omayrae in memory of Omayra Sánchez.
