= Gigagryllus =

Scientific classification
- Kingdom: Animalia
- Phylum: Arthropoda
- Class: Insecta
- Order: Orthoptera
- Suborder: Ensifera
- Family: Gryllidae
- Genus: Gigagryllus; Cadena-Castañeda & García, 2020
- Species: G. omayrae

Binomial name
- Gigagryllus omayrae Cadena-Castañeda & García, 2020

Genus of crickets

Gigagryllus is a genus of giant field cricket in the subfamily Gryllinae. Its type and only species is Gigagryllus omayrae.

== Etymology ==
The species name, omayrae, is dedicated to Omayra Sánchez, a victim of the Armero tragedy, which occurred in the department of Tolima.

== Distribution ==
Gigagryllus omayrae is found in the middle Magdalena region of Colombia, particularly in the department of Tolima.
