= Titan2d-mod =

Titan2d-mod (titan 3.1.1, 2016) is a free open source code to simulate dry granular avalanche flows over natural terrain, modified from an early version (titan 3.0.0, 2011) of TITAN2D code. It is available in the contributor's home page http://lsec.cc.ac.cn/~lyuan/code.html, or searchable in the Sourceforge website.

== Overview ==
The code allows for several variants of the shallow granular flow model, and the governing equations are discretized on Cartesian meshes and solved with the Davis predictor-corrector Godunov type method. The code structures and usage are the same as earlier TITAN2D versions (see user's manual), but some bugs and errors occurring in titan 3.0.0 are corrected, and stopping criteria are added. A non-hydrostatic Savage-Hutter model is implemented as the default.

== See also ==
- TITAN2D (open source geoflow simulation software)
