= Dolores, Colombia =

Dolores, Tolima
- Municipality and town
- Flag Coat of arms

- Location of the municipality and town of Dolores, Tolima in the Tolima Department of Colombia.
- Coordinates: 3°32′17″N 74°53′42″O
- Country: Colombia
- Department: Tolima Department

Government
  - Mayor: Cesar Giovanny (2020–2023)

Area
  - Total: 672 km^{2} (259 sq mi)
- Elevation: 1,445 m (4,741 ft)

Population (2017)
  - Total: 7,923
- Time zone: UTC-5 (Colombia Standard Time)

Dolores is a town and municipality in the Tolima department of Colombia. The population of the municipality was 9,680 as of the 1993 census.

== Economy ==
The economy of Dolores is primarily based on agriculture. The municipality is part of a group of small coffee-producing communities in eastern Tolima, alongside Villarrica, Prado, Purificación, Cunday and Icononzo, that have developed traceable, small-farm specialty coffee production. Local producers manage their own micro-mills, carrying out harvesting, depulping, fermentation, washing and drying of coffee parchment.

== Demographics ==
Dolore's 2026 population is now estimated at 8,635. The municipality operates under Colombia Standard Time (UTC−5).

== Climate ==
Climate data for Dolores (Dolores Hda Madron), elevation 1,456 m (4,777 ft), (1981–2010)
Month	Jan	Feb	Mar	Apr	May	Jun	Jul	Aug	Sep	Oct	Nov	Dec	Year
Mean daily maximum °C (°F)	24.6 (76.3)	24.7 (76.5)	24.8 (76.6)	24.4 (75.9)	24.4 (75.9)	24.2 (75.6)	24.3 (75.7)	25.5 (77.9)	25.7 (78.3)	24.5 (76.1)	23.7 (74.7)	24.0 (75.2)	24.6 (76.3)
Daily mean °C (°F)	21.1 (70.0)	21.3 (70.3)	21.2 (70.2)	21.1 (70.0)	21.1 (70.0)	20.9 (69.6)	20.8 (69.4)	21.5 (70.7)	21.7 (71.1)	21.1 (70.0)	20.6 (69.1)	20.8 (69.4)	21.1 (70.0)
Mean daily minimum °C (°F)	17.8 (64.0)	17.9 (64.2)	17.9 (64.2)	17.8 (64.0)	17.8 (64.0)	17.6 (63.7)	17.2 (63.0)	17.7 (63.9)	17.8 (64.0)	17.6 (63.7)	17.6 (63.7)	17.7 (63.9)	17.7 (63.9)
Average precipitation mm (inches)	124.4 (4.90)	140.4 (5.53)	201.0 (7.91)	149.6 (5.89)	135.5 (5.33)	64.1 (2.52)	44.8 (1.76)	29.5 (1.16)	70.9 (2.79)	242.6 (9.55)	319.4 (12.57)	235.9 (9.29)	1,753.1 (69.02)
Average precipitation days	11	13	16	17	18	14	12	10	13	19	20	17	169
Average relative humidity (%)	79	77	79	80	78	74	71	68	70	79	83	82	77
Mean monthly sunshine hours	192.2	155.3	139.5	138.0	158.1	174.0	186.0	189.1	156.0	148.8	141.0	170.5	1,948.5
Mean daily sunshine hours	6.2	5.5	4.5	4.6	5.1	5.8	6.0	6.1	5.2	4.8	4.7	5.5	5.3
Source: Instituto de Hidrologia Meteorologia y Estudios Ambientales
