= Frank Fournier =

French photographer

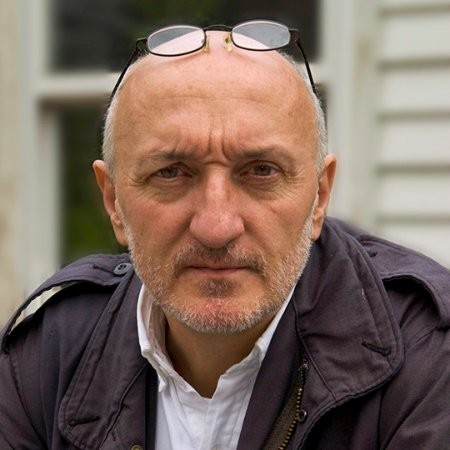
Frank Fournier - Photo by Michelle Poiré

Frank Fournier (born 1948) is a French photographer. Before becoming a photographer, he studied medicine like his father, who was a surgeon. He moved to New York City and became a staff photographer at Contact Press Images in 1982 after joining the office staff in 1977. He is best known for his coverage of the 1985 Armero tragedy in Colombia; the Nevado del Ruiz volcano erupted, leading to a mudslide that killed more than 25,000 people. His portrait of Omayra Sánchez, a dying 13-year-old girl trapped under the debris of her home, won the 1986 World Press Photo of the Year award.
