= Volcano Disaster Assistance Program =

The Volcano Disaster Assistance Program (VDAP) was founded by the U.S. Geological Survey and the United States Agency for International Development's Office of U.S. Foreign Disaster Assistance after the eruption of Nevado del Ruiz (Colombia) in 1985. The volcanic eruption melted a glacier triggering a lahar that killed 25,000 people. It was determined that increased monitoring and enhanced communications between scientists and civil authorities would make it easier to evacuate local populations and save lives. Today the program responds to volcanic crises around the world. The aim of the program is to assist in saving lives and property, to reduce economic losses, and to prevent a natural hazard becoming a natural disaster. VDAP staff members are based at the USGS Cascades Volcano Observatory, in Vancouver, Washington. VDAP channels its energy into four main activities: response to natural disaster, capacity building, training, and volcanological research. In 2024, VDAP received the American Geophysical Union's International Award for its sustained effort in volcanic disaster risk reduction.

== Response ==
VDAP responds primarily to ‘non-domestic’ eruptions outside the United States. Since 1986, the team has responded to over 70 major events around the world. Scores of other remote responses involve consultations with the relevant local observatories. A subset of foreign responses are listed in the following table and on the map.

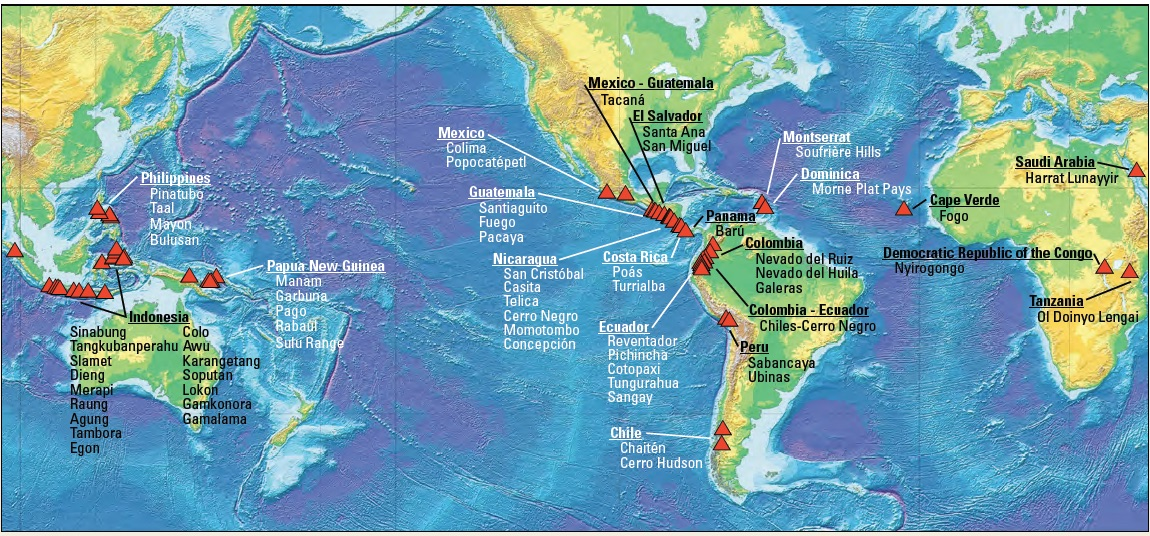
Map of responses by the USGS/OFDA Volcano Disaster Assistance Program.
Location	Year	Disaster Responses
Mount Pinatubo, Philippines	1991	Less than 5 years after its creation, in April of 1991, VDAP was called to assist the Philippine scientists of the Philippine Institute of Volcanology and Seismology or PHIVOLCS during unrest at Pinatubo volcano. The culminating June eruptions of Pinatubo were among the largest on Earth for all of the 20th Century. Around 75,000 people and US$250 million to $375 million worth of equipment were evacuated before the major eruption, in large part due to the efforts of VDAP and PHIVOLCS. A NOVA documentary, produced by WGBH Boston followed the USGS/VDAP role in the eruption
Nevado del Huila, Colombia	2007-2008	VDAP assisted colleagues at the Colombian Geological Survey, formerly INGEOMINAS, to successfully forecast the arrival of volcanic mudflows, allowing for multiple evacuations of thousands of people.
Chaitén, Chile	2008	USGS staff from VDAP assisted during the eruption and later helped to install real-time seismic monitoring to help scientists more closely watch the volcano and understand its activity.
Merapi, Indonesia	2010	VDAP worked with the Indonesian Center for Volcanology and Geologic Hazard Mitigation (CVGHM) to use satellite data to analyze activity at the volcano, helping to save thousands of lives with preemptive evacuations.
Agung, Indonesia	2017	Unrest in 2017 at Mount Agung in Bali created great concern due to a previous devastating eruption in 1963. VDAP sent 14 staff over a two-month period in September-November. They installed equipment, used drones to measure gas emissions, and assisted with data interpretation, prior to an eruption in late November that continued for about a year.

== Preparation and Monitoring ==
Capacity building involves the development of education and monitoring in hazardous areas. VDAP staff install equipment, teach field methods, train on eruption forecasting methods and assess hazards in volcanically active areas. The work is a major focus for VDAP staff and is undertaken around the world.

== Training ==
VDAP holds workshops and training courses around the world. These include volcano seismology, geodesy, remote sensing and Geographic information system (GIS) modelling. VDAP funds and assists the 8-week annual international field course run by the University of Hawaii's CSAV (Center for the Study of Active Volcanism) in Hilo, Hawaii and Vancouver, WA. The students include geologists, geochemists and geophysicists, who receive training in the science behind volcano monitoring.

== Research ==
VDAP supports projects which improve the forecasting of eruptions or better characterize the effects of previous eruptions. Examples of this include research at Pinatubo and Chaitén Volcano, Chile.
