= Coat of arms of Tolima Department =

Coat of arms of Tolima
- Armiger: The Department of Tolima
- Adopted: December 7, 1815
- Crest: Azure, party per bend argent, gules a swan its wings expanded and elevated Or, holding on its sinister talon a torch argent, fired proper, and in its beak a key sable. Mountains vert topped in argent, parted by a river azure.
- Shield: A phrygian cap atop a lance issuant sable.
- Supporters: Canelo stalks of 33 leaves (either side) proper flanking both sides.
- Other elements: A ribbon in the Tricolour ties the crest and supporters in a bow,
- Use: Gubernatorial Flag, official documents.

The Coat of arms of Tolima is the coat of arms of the Colombian Department of Tolima. The emblem was adopted by Law of December 7, 1815 ordained by the United Chambers of the Province of Mariquita and sanctioned by José León Armero, the governor and general in command. In 1861 the coat of arms was adopted for the Sovereign State of Tolima by Decree of April 12 of the same year by General Tomas Cipriano de Mosquera and officially established on September 7.
