= Armero =

Municipality in Tolima, Colombia

- Municipality
- Centro de Visitantes de Armero in 2023

- Flag Coat of arms

- Location of the town and municipality of Armero in the Department of Tolima
- Coordinates: 4°57′48″N 74°54′20″W
- Country: Colombia
- Region: Andean
- Department: Tolima

Government
  - Mayor: Ricardo Ramirez Alfaro (2022–2023)

Area
  - Total: 440.5 km^{2} (170.1 sq mi)
- Elevation: 285 m (935 ft)

Population (2017)
  - Total: 11,724
- Time zone: UTC-5
- Postal code: 732060, 732067, 732068.
- Area code: 57
- Website: http://www.armeroguayabal-tolima.gov.co/index.shtml

Armero is a municipality in the Tolima Department, Colombia. According to the National Department of Statistics of Colombia, 12,852 lived in the town in 2005. Its median temperature is 27 °C. It was founded in 1895, but was not officially recognized as the seat of the region until 29 September 1908, by President Rafael Reyes. The town was originally named San Lorenzo. In 1930, the name was changed to Armero in memory of José León Armero, a national martyr.

Because the region became the main cotton producer in the country, the city was called Colombia's White City. It was a prosperous agricultural area until 1985.

The original seat of the region was destroyed on 13 November 1985, after an eruption of the Nevado del Ruiz Volcano produced lahars that buried the town and killed about 23,000 people. Approximately 31,000 people lived in the area at the time. The incident became known as the Armero tragedy. While the destruction of the town made world news in its own right, the best known victim was Omayra Sánchez, a young girl who died after being trapped by water and concrete up to her neck for three days. After this event, the town of Guayabal was assigned as the seat of the municipality of Armero, rendering Armero a ghost town.

The survivors were relocated to the towns of Guayabal and Lérida where they received housing and money, although little was done in aiding the survivors in reconstructing their lives.

In the area where the city was located, survivors created an extensive cemetery. Where each one had a house, they constructed a tomb with an epitaph. In this way, they constructed a new symbolic city called Camposanto.

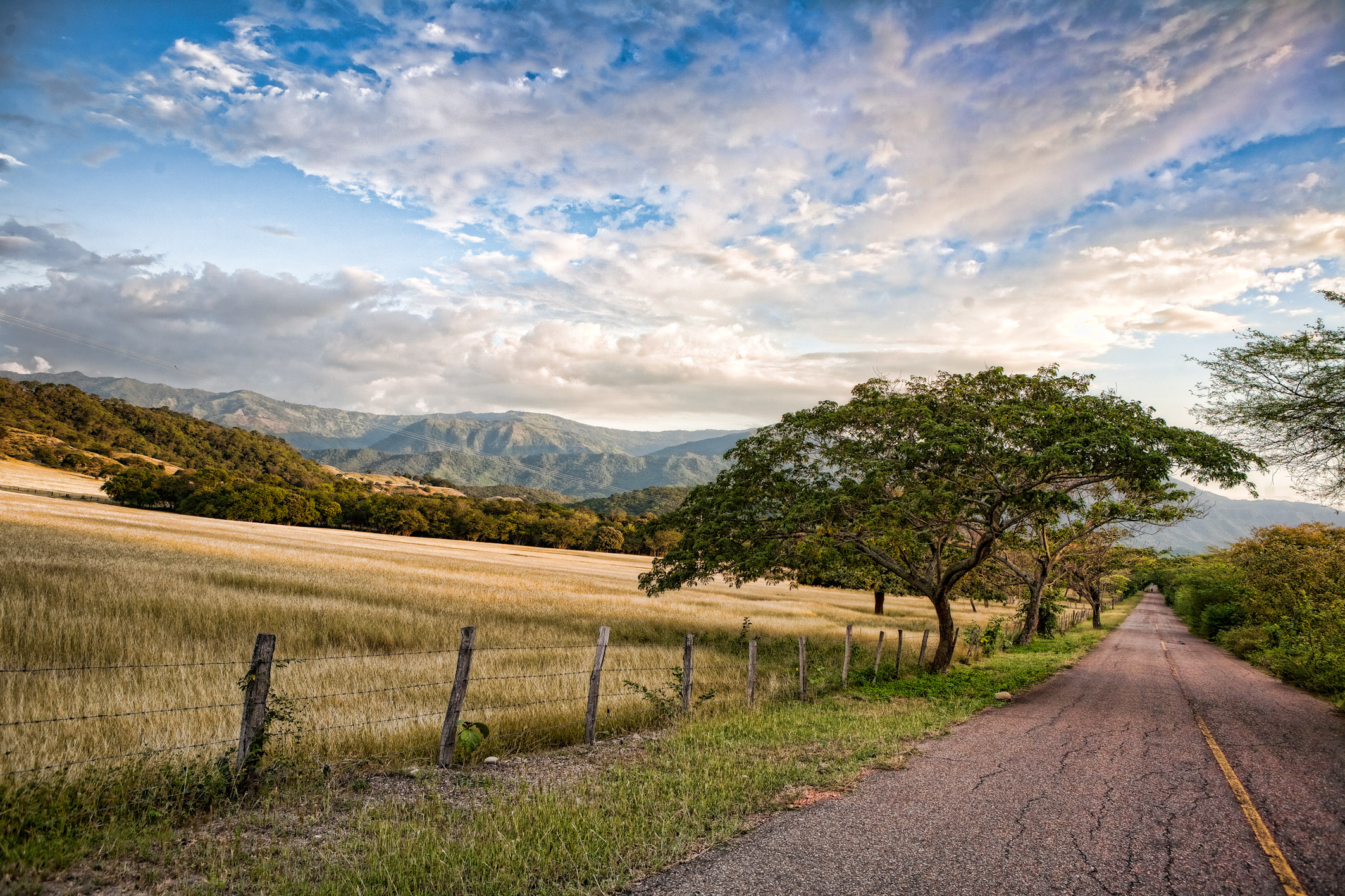
Rural area in the municipality of Armero

Armando Armero is a foundation set up to bring social and economic development to a zone that has been devastated in the aftermath of the last eruption of Ruiz. It has created the Centro de Interpretación de la Memoria y la Tragedia de Armero, the first Memory Interpretation Center of a Natural Catastrophe in the world located exactly where the events occurred. There are memorial sites at each of the important places of the city (such as hospitals, parks, and theaters) near the ruins. In those, visitors can learn about the city as they existed before the tragedy.

== Climate ==
Climate data for Armero (Armero Gja), elevation 300 m (980 ft), (1981–2010)
Month	Jan	Feb	Mar	Apr	May	Jun	Jul	Aug	Sep	Oct	Nov	Dec	Year
Mean daily maximum °C (°F)	33.7 (92.7)	34.2 (93.6)	33.7 (92.7)	32.7 (90.9)	32.6 (90.7)	33.0 (91.4)	34.2 (93.6)	35.3 (95.5)	34.3 (93.7)	32.6 (90.7)	32.2 (90.0)	32.7 (90.9)	33.5 (92.3)
Daily mean °C (°F)	28.3 (82.9)	28.4 (83.1)	28.0 (82.4)	27.7 (81.9)	27.8 (82.0)	28.0 (82.4)	28.7 (83.7)	29.2 (84.6)	28.7 (83.7)	27.9 (82.2)	27.6 (81.7)	27.9 (82.2)	28.2 (82.8)
Mean daily minimum °C (°F)	21.2 (70.2)	21.1 (70.0)	20.9 (69.6)	20.8 (69.4)	20.8 (69.4)	20.8 (69.4)	20.7 (69.3)	20.9 (69.6)	20.8 (69.4)	20.9 (69.6)	21.1 (70.0)	21.6 (70.9)	21.0 (69.8)
Average precipitation mm (inches)	77.8 (3.06)	104.3 (4.11)	139.1 (5.48)	226.5 (8.92)	219.8 (8.65)	105.2 (4.14)	89.2 (3.51)	123.3 (4.85)	178.0 (7.01)	235.6 (9.28)	187.9 (7.40)	108.9 (4.29)	1,788.3 (70.41)
Average precipitation days	9	9	12	15	14	10	9	10	13	17	15	11	142
Average relative humidity (%)	69	68	70	72	72	70	66	64	67	71	73	71	69
Mean monthly sunshine hours	210.8	172.2	161.2	159.0	176.7	195.0	217.0	213.9	192.0	186.0	183.0	192.2	2,259
Mean daily sunshine hours	6.8	6.1	5.2	5.3	5.7	6.5	7.0	6.9	6.4	6.0	6.1	6.2	6.2
Source: Instituto de Hidrologia Meteorologia y Estudios Ambientales
