= Geocarto International =

- Discipline: Remote sensing, Earth and atmospheric sciences
- Language: English

Publication details
- Publisher: Taylor & Francis

Standard abbreviations
- ISO 4: Geocarto Int.

Indexing
- ISSN: 1010-6049 (print); 1752-0762 (web)

Geocarto International is an academic journal published by Taylor & Francis. It focuses on remote sensing, GIS, geoscience and environmental sciences. Its editor-in-chief is Kamlesh Lulla. The 2019-2020 Journal Impact IF of Geocarto International is 4.889, which is updated in 2020.
