= Germán Santa María Barragán =

Colombian journalist and ambassador

23rd Colombia Ambassador to Portugal
- Incumbent
- Assumed office 31 May 2011
- President: Juan Manuel Santos Calderón
- Preceded by: Arturo Sarabia Better

Personal details
- Born: Germán Santamaría Barragán; 24 January 1950 (age 76) Líbano, Tolima, Colombia
- Occupation: Journalist, writer

Germán Santa María Barragán (born 24 January 1950) is the current Ambassador of Colombia to Portugal. A renowned journalist in Colombia, he is a five-time winner of the Simón Bolívar National Award in Journalism, and twice served as president of the Bogotá Circle of Journalists; he has been a contributor for El Tiempo for eleven years, and editor-in-chief of Diners magazine since 1999. As a writer, his novel No Morirás won the Julio Cortázar Ibero-American Short Story Award, and was turned into a made-for-television film by director Jorge Alí Triana and aired in 1997.

== Ambassadorship ==
Santa María was appointed Ambassador Extraordinary and Plenipotentiary of Colombia to Portugal on 2 March 2011 by President Juan Manuel Santos Calderón at a ceremony at the Palace of Nariño. Santa María presented his Letters of Credence to the President of Portugal, Aníbal Cavaco Silva, on 31 May 2011 during a ceremony at the Belém Palace. As Ambassador to Portugal, Santa María is also accredited as Non-Resident Ambassador of Colombia to the African nations of Burkina Faso, Cape Verde, Côte d'Ivoire, Equatorial Guinea, the Gambia, Guinea, Guinea-Bissau, Mali, Mauritania, São Tomé and Príncipe, Senegal, Sierra Leone, and Togo.

== Selected works ==
- Los Días del Calor [The Days of Heat]. Bogotá: Ediciones Punto Rojo. 1970. OCLC 2019584.
- Marilyn. Ibagué: University of Tolima. 1974. OCLC 1671936.
- Morir Último [To Die Last]. Bogotá: Carlos Valencia Editores. 1978. ISBN 978-84-8277-001-7. OCLC 5100647.
- Crónicas [Chronicles]. Colección Narrativa (5). Ibagué: Instituto Tolimense de Cultura. 1981. OCLC 9195855.
- Colombia Y Otras Sangres: Díez Años de Periodismo [Colombia and Other Blood: Ten Years of Journalism]. Bogotá: Planeta Editores. 1987. ISBN 978-958-614-248-9. OCLC 17793253.
- No Morirás [You Will Not Die]. Bogotá: Editorial Oveja Negra. 1992. ISBN 978-958-06-0084-8. OCLC 253099556.
  - Diana Lloreda (7 February 1993). "NO MORIRÁS: Germán Santamaría. Editorial Oveja Negra; Bogotá, 1992". El Tiempo (Review).

== See also ==
- Orlando Sardi de Lima
