= Lahar =

Volcanic mudslide

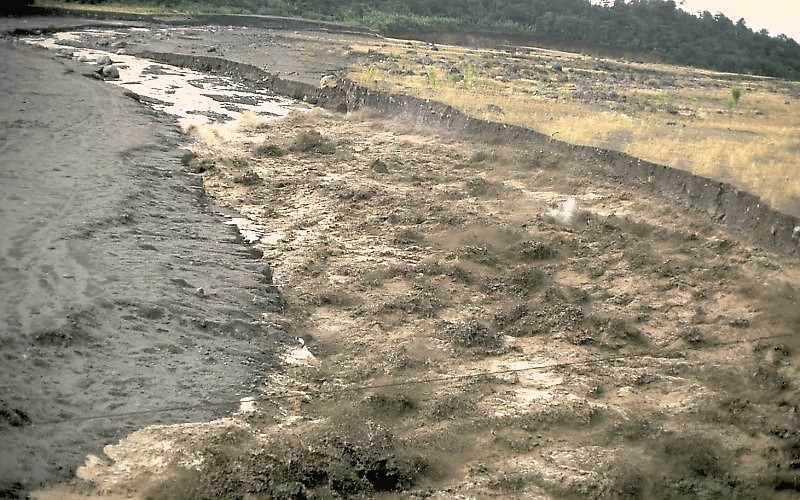
A lahar travels down a river valley in Guatemala near the Santa María volcano, 1989

A lahar ( /ˈlɑːhɑːr/, from Javanese: lahar, ꦭꦲꦂ) is a violent type of mudflow or debris flow composed of a slurry of pyroclastic material, rocky debris and water. The material flows down from a volcano, typically along a river valley.

Lahars are often extremely destructive and deadly; they can flow tens of metres per second, they have been known to be up to 140 metres (460 ft) deep, and large flows tend to destroy any structures in their path. Notable lahars include those at Mount Pinatubo in the Philippines and Nevado del Ruiz in Colombia, the latter of which killed more than 20,000 people in the Armero tragedy.

== Etymology ==
The word lahar is of Javanese origin. Berend George Escher introduced it as a geological term in 1922.

== Description ==
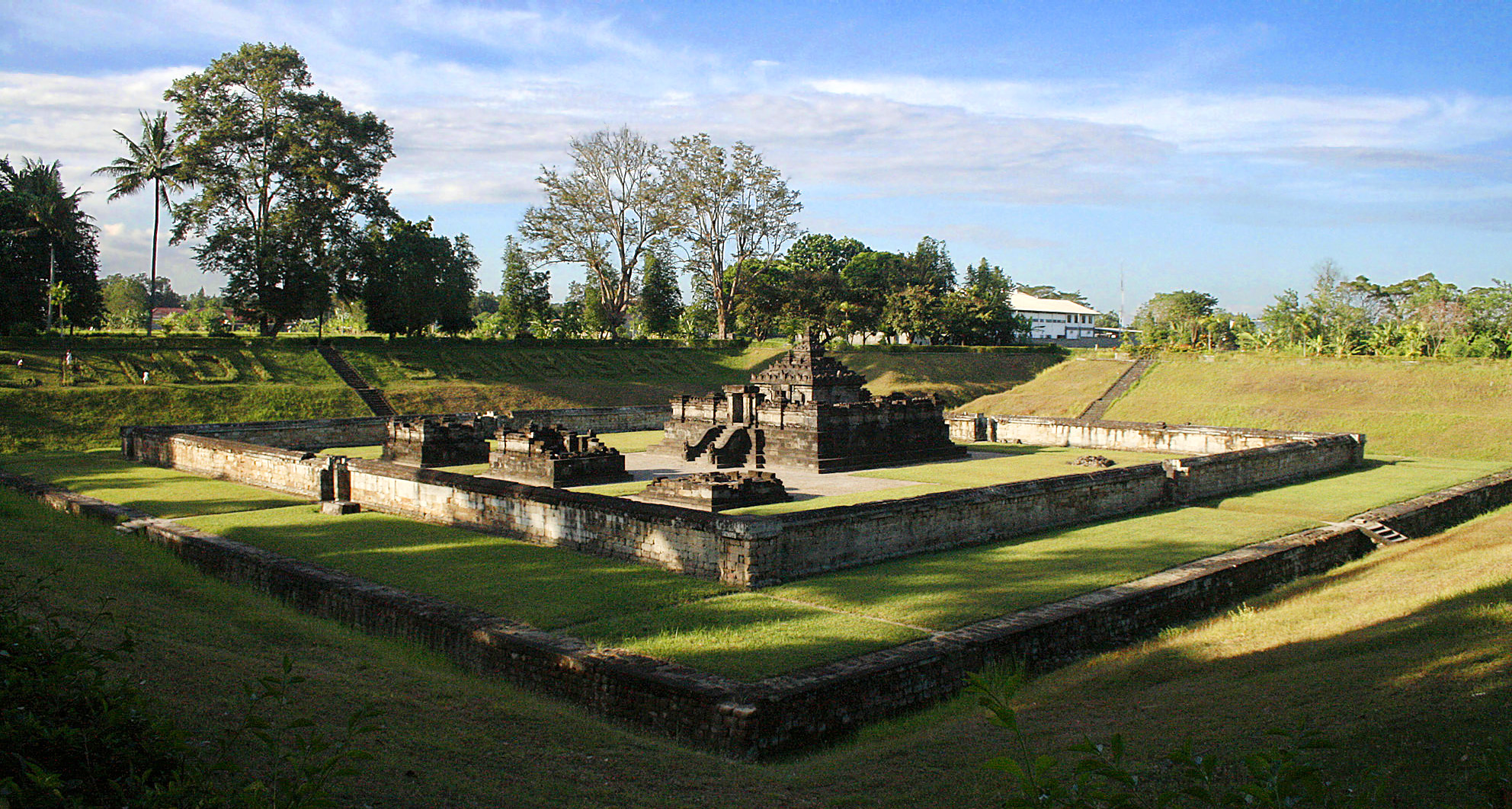
Excavated 9th century Sambisari Hindu temple near Yogyakarta in Java, Indonesia. The temple was buried 6.5 metres under the lahar volcanic debris accumulated from centuries of Mount Merapi eruptions.

The word lahar is a general term for a flowing mixture of water and pyroclastic debris. It does not refer to a particular rheology or sediment concentration. Lahars can occur as normal stream flows (sediment concentration of less than 30%), hyper-concentrated stream flows (sediment concentration between 30 and 60%), or debris flows (sediment concentration exceeding 60%). Indeed, the rheology and subsequent behaviour of a lahar may vary in place and time within a single event, owing to changes in sediment supply and water supply. Lahars are described as 'primary' or 'syn-eruptive' if they occur simultaneously with or are triggered by primary volcanic activity. 'Secondary' or 'post-eruptive' lahars occur in the absence of primary volcanic activity, e.g. as a result of rainfall during pauses in activity or during dormancy.

In addition to their variable rheology, lahars vary considerably in magnitude. The Osceola Lahar produced by Mount Rainier in modern-day Washington some 5600 years ago resulted in a wall of mud 140 metres (460 ft) deep in the White River canyon and covered an area of over 330 square kilometres (130 sq mi), for a total volume of 2.3 cubic kilometres (1/2 mi^{3}). A debris-flow lahar can erase virtually any structure in its path, while a hyperconcentrated-flow lahar is capable of carving its own pathway, destroying buildings by undermining their foundations. A hyperconcentrated-flow lahar can leave even frail huts standing, while at the same time burying them in mud, which can harden to near-concrete hardness. A lahar's viscosity decreases the longer it flows and can be further thinned by rain, producing a quicksand-like mixture that can remain fluidized for weeks and complicate search and rescue.

Lahars vary in speed. Small lahars less than a few metres wide and several centimetres deep may flow a few metres per second. Large lahars hundreds of metres wide and tens of metres deep can flow several tens of metres per second (22 mph or more), much too fast for people to outrun. On steep slopes, lahar speeds can exceed 200 kilometres per hour (120 mph). A lahar can cause catastrophic destruction along a potential path of more than 300 kilometres (190 mi).

Lahars from the 1985 Nevado del Ruiz eruption in Colombia caused the Armero tragedy, burying the city of Armero under 5 metres (16 ft) of mud and debris and killing an estimated 23,000 people. A lahar caused New Zealand's Tangiwai disaster, where 151 people died after a Christmas Eve express train fell into the Whangaehu River in 1953. Lahars have caused 17% of volcano-related deaths between 1783 and 1997.

== Trigger mechanisms ==
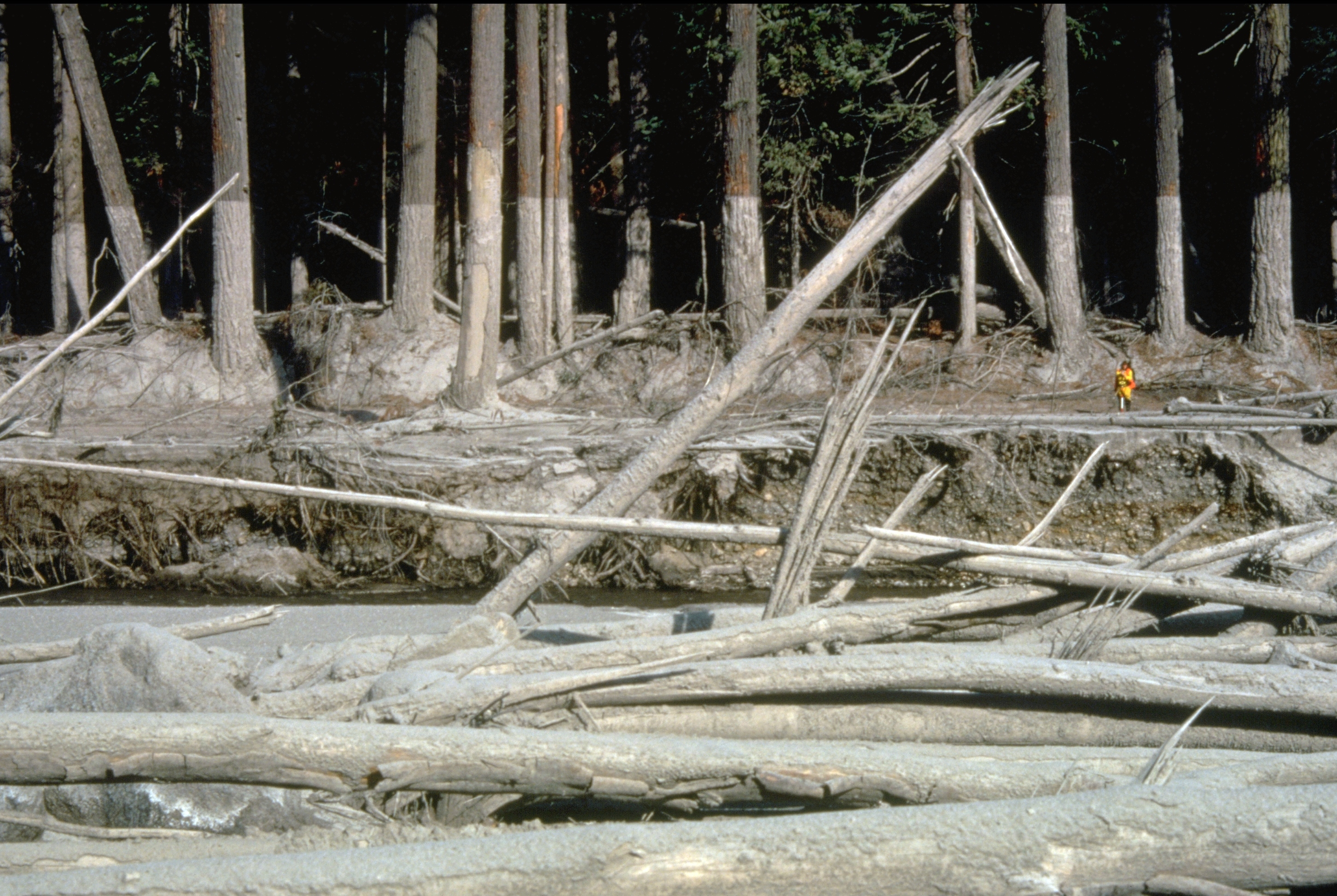
Mudline left behind on trees on the banks of the Muddy River after the 1980 eruption of Mount St. Helens showing the height of the lahar

Lahars have several possible causes:

- Snow and glaciers can be melted by lava or pyroclastic surges during an eruption.
- Lava can erupt from open vents and mix with wet soil, mud or snow on the slope of the volcano making a very viscous, high energy lahar. The higher up the slope of the volcano, the more gravitational potential energy the flows will have.
- A flood caused by a glacier, lake breakout, or heavy rainfalls can generate lahars, also called glacier run or jökulhlaup.
- Water from a crater lake can combine with volcanic material in an eruption.
- Heavy rainfall can mobilize unconsolidated pyroclastic deposits.

In particular, although lahars are typically associated with the effects of volcanic activity, lahars can occur even without any current volcanic activity, as long as the conditions are right to cause the collapse and movement of mud originating from existing volcanic ash deposits.

- Snow and glaciers can melt during periods of mild to hot weather.
- Earthquakes underneath or close to the volcano can shake material loose and cause it to collapse, triggering a lahar avalanche.
- Rainfall can cause the still-hanging slabs of solidified mud to come rushing down the slopes which flow towards a river at more than 19 mph (30 km/h), causing devastating results.

== Places at risk ==
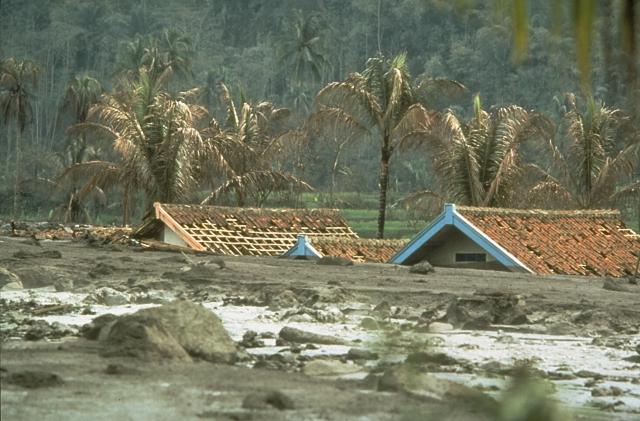
The aftermath of a lahar from the 1982 eruption of Galunggung, Indonesia

Several mountains in the world – including Mount Rainier in the United States, Mount Ruapehu in New Zealand, and Merapi and Galunggung in Indonesia – are considered particularly dangerous due to the risk of lahars. Several towns in the Puyallup River valley in Washington state, including Orting, are built on top of lahar deposits that are only about 500 years old. Lahars are predicted to flow through the valley every 500 to 1,000 years, so Orting, Sumner, Puyallup, Fife, and the Port of Tacoma face considerable risk. The USGS has set up lahar warning sirens in Pierce County, Washington, so that people can flee an approaching debris flow in the event of a Mount Rainier eruption.

A lahar warning system has been set up at Mount Ruapehu by the New Zealand Department of Conservation and hailed as a success after it successfully alerted officials to an impending lahar on 18 March 2007.

Since mid-June 1991, when violent eruptions triggered Mount Pinatubo's first lahars in 500 years, a system to monitor and warn of lahars has been in operation. Radio-telemetered rain gauges provide data on rainfall in lahar source regions, acoustic flow monitors on stream banks detect ground vibration as lahars pass, and staffed watchpoints further confirm that lahars are rushing down Pinatubo's slopes. This system has enabled warnings to be sounded for most but not all major lahars at Pinatubo, saving hundreds of lives. Physical preventative measures by the Philippine government were not adequate to stop over 6 m (20 ft) of mud from flooding many villages around Mount Pinatubo from 1992 through 1998.

Scientists and governments try to identify areas with a high risk of lahars based on historical events and computer models. Volcano scientists play a critical role in effective hazard education by informing officials and the public about realistic hazard probabilities and scenarios (including potential magnitude, timing, and impacts); by helping evaluate the effectiveness of proposed risk-reduction strategies; by helping promote acceptance of (and confidence in) hazards information through participatory engagement with officials and vulnerable communities as partners in risk reduction efforts; and by communicating with emergency managers during extreme events. An example of such a model is TITAN2D. These models are directed towards future planning: identifying low-risk regions to place community buildings, discovering how to mitigate lahars with dams, and constructing evacuation plans.

== Examples ==
=== Nevado del Ruiz ===
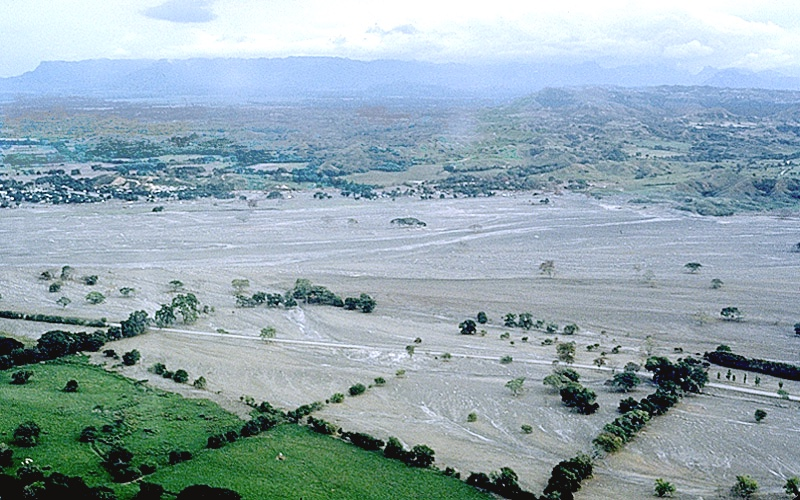
The lahar from the 1985 eruption of Nevado del Ruiz that wiped out the town of Armero in Colombia

In 1985, the volcano Nevado del Ruiz erupted in central Colombia. As pyroclastic flows erupted from the volcano's crater, they melted the mountain's glaciers, sending four enormous lahars down its slopes at 60 kilometers per hour (37 miles per hour). The lahars picked up speed in gullies and coursed into the six major rivers at the base of the volcano; they engulfed the town of Armero, killing more than 20,000 of its almost 29,000 inhabitants.

Casualties in other towns, particularly Chinchiná, brought the overall death toll to over 25,000. Footage and photographs of Omayra Sánchez, a young victim of the tragedy, were published around the world. Other photographs of the lahars and the impact of the disaster captured attention worldwide and led to controversy over the degree to which the Colombian government was responsible for the disaster.

=== Mount Pinatubo ===
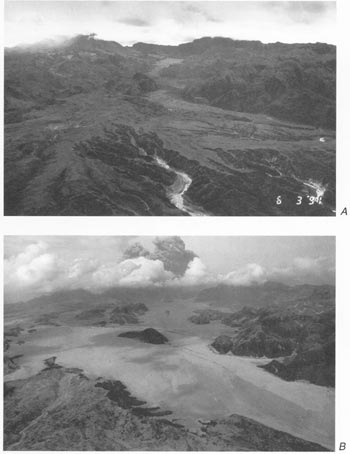
A before-and-after photograph of a river valley filled in by lahars from Mount Pinatubo

Lahars caused most of the deaths of the 1991 eruption of Mount Pinatubo. The initial eruption killed six people, but the lahars killed more than 1500. The eye of Typhoon Yunya passed over the volcano during its eruption on 15 June 1991, and the resulting rain triggered the flow of volcanic ash, boulders, and water down rivers surrounding the volcano. Angeles City in Pampanga and neighbouring cities and towns were damaged by lahars when Sapang Balen Creek and the Abacan River became channels for mudflows and carried them to the heart of the city and surrounding areas.

Over 6 metres (20 ft) of mud inundated and damaged the towns of Castillejos, San Marcelino and Botolan in Zambales, Porac and Mabalacat in Pampanga, Tarlac City, Capas, Concepcion and Bamban in Tarlac. The Bamban Bridge on the MacArthur Highway, a major north-south transportation route, was destroyed, and temporary bridges erected in its place were inundated by subsequent lahars.

From 3 September to 1 October 1995, pyroclastic material which clung to the slopes of Pinatubo and surrounding mountains rushed down because of heavy rain, and turned into an 8-metre (25 ft) lahar. This mudflow killed at least 100 people in Barangay Cabalantian in Bacolor. The Philippine government under President Fidel V. Ramos ordered the construction of the FVR Mega Dike in an attempt to protect people from further mudflows.

Typhoon Reming triggered additional lahars in the Philippines in 2006.

=== Mayon ===
Lahars that followed the eruption of Mayon Volcano in 1814 buried the town of Cagsawa.

=== Mount Ruapehu ===
A lahar that occurred while Mount Ruapehu was not erupting undermined a train bridge and caused the Tangiwai disaster.

== See also ==
- Glacial lake outburst flood
- Jökulhlaup
- Mass wasting
- Volcanic hazard
