= Cunday =

Coordinates: 4°05′N 74°40′W

- Municipality and town
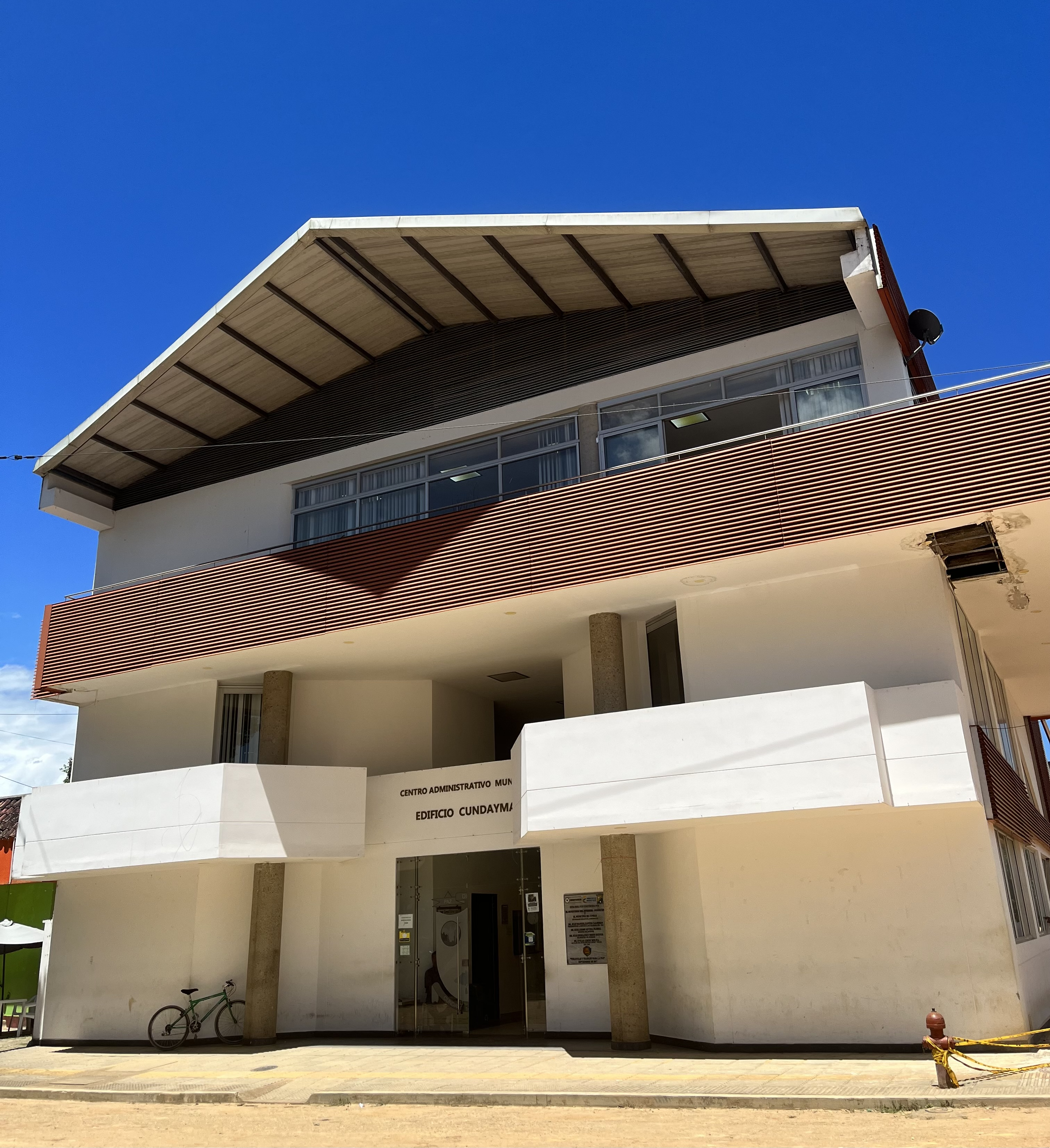
- Cunday Administrative Center Building

- Flag Coat of arms

- Location of the municipality and town of Cunday in the Tolima Department of Colombia.
- Country: Colombia
- Department: Tolima Department

Government
  - Mayor: Evelio Girón Molina

Area
  - Total: 526 km^{2} (203 sq mi)
- Elevation: 475 m (1,558 ft)

Population (2017)
  - Total: 9,544
  - Density: 18.1/km^{2} (47.0/sq mi)
- Time zone: UTC-5 (Colombia Standard Time)

Cunday is a town and municipality in the Tolima department of Colombia. The population of the municipality was 11,440 as of the 1993 census.
