= Santa Isabel, Tolima =

Municipality in Tolima, Colombia

Coordinates: 4.71667°N 75.1014°W

- Municipality and town
- Flag Coat of arms

- Location of the municipality and town of Santa Isabel, Tolima in the Tolima Department of Colombia.
- Country: Colombia
- Department: Tolima Department

Area
  - Total: 416 km^{2} (161 sq mi)
- Elevation: 2,250 m (7,380 ft)

Population (2016)
  - Total: 6,382
- Time zone: UTC-5 (Colombia Standard Time)

Santa Isabel (Spanish pronunciation: [ˈsantajsaˈβel]) is a town and municipality in the Tolima department of Colombia. The population of the municipality was 6,220 as of the 1993 census.

== History ==
Santa Isabel was founded on 12 September 1893, originally as Tolda de María. It was later renamed after Elizabeth of Hungary (Isabel de Hungría), the patron saint of the then-Presbyter of Madrid. Initial settlers were primarily hunters from nearby Venadillo, with later immigration waves including loggers and those displaced by local conflict, the majority of whom were Paisa. In 1897, Santa Isabel was designated as a corregimiento under Venadillo, becoming a municipality by order of the Tolima Department Assembly in 1904.

== Economy ==
Santa Isabel is considered a breadbasket of northern Tolima, being known for its pea production. Other crops include plantain, tamarillo, coffee, sugar cane, corn, potato, and blackberry. Besides the regionally common animal husbandry, a small mining industry was maintained since the municipality's founding.

== Climate ==
Climate data for Santa Isabel (Bodega La), elevation 2,750 m (9,020 ft), (1981–2010)
Month	Jan	Feb	Mar	Apr	May	Jun	Jul	Aug	Sep	Oct	Nov	Dec	Year
Mean daily maximum °C (°F)	16.6 (61.9)	17.0 (62.6)	17.0 (62.6)	17.1 (62.8)	17.5 (63.5)	17.5 (63.5)	17.5 (63.5)	17.5 (63.5)	17.3 (63.1)	17.0 (62.6)	16.6 (61.9)	17.0 (62.6)	17.1 (62.8)
Mean daily minimum °C (°F)	9.8 (49.6)	10.0 (50.0)	10.0 (50.0)	10.1 (50.2)	10.1 (50.2)	10.3 (50.5)	10.3 (50.5)	10.2 (50.4)	10.1 (50.2)	10.3 (50.5)	10.3 (50.5)	10.3 (50.5)	10.1 (50.2)
Average precipitation mm (inches)	64.9 (2.56)	97.9 (3.85)	138.2 (5.44)	192.1 (7.56)	170.8 (6.72)	95.1 (3.74)	72.9 (2.87)	80.4 (3.17)	156.1 (6.15)	136.9 (5.39)	136.4 (5.37)	86.5 (3.41)	1,421.9 (55.98)
Average precipitation days	8	11	15	18	16	10	9	8	13	15	15	10	148
Source: Instituto de Hidrologia Meteorologia y Estudios Ambientales
