= Chinchiná, Caldas =

- Municipality and town
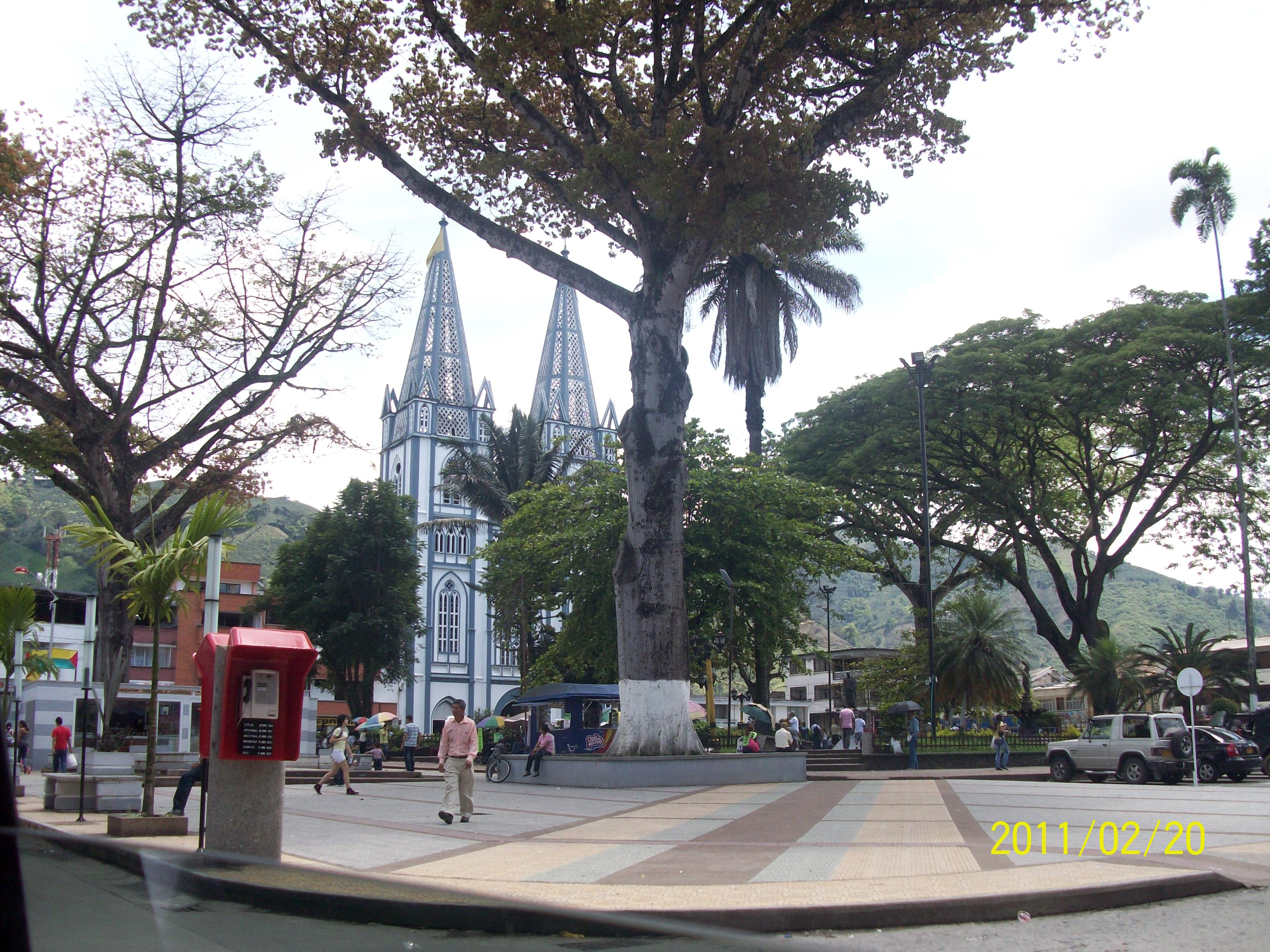

- Flag Coat of arms

- Location of the municipality and town of Chinchiná, Caldas in the Caldas Department of Colombia.

- Location in Colombia
- Coordinates: 4°58′57″N 75°36′13″W
- Country: Colombia
- Department: Caldas Department
- Founded: 1857; 169 years ago

Government
  - Mayor: Dylan Cortes Jimenez

Area
  - Municipality and town: 109.4 km^{2} (42.2 sq mi)
  - Urban: 4.95 km^{2} (1.91 sq mi)
- Elevation: 1,378 m (4,521 ft)

Population (2018 census)
  - Municipality and town: 51,271
  - Density: 468.7/km^{2} (1,214/sq mi)
  - Urban: 44,570
  - Urban density: 9,000/km^{2} (23,300/sq mi)
- Demonym: Chinchinense
- Time zone: UTC-5 (Colombia Standard Time)
- Area code: 57 + 6
- Website: Official website (in Spanish)

Chinchiná is a town and municipality located in the department of Caldas in Colombia, 17 kilometres (11 mi) southwest of Manizales. Founded in 1857 by Antioquian colonists, Chinchiná lies 1,360 meters (4,460 ft) above sea level in a valley surrounded by coffee plantations in the Central Cordillera of the Andes. An active volcano, Nevado del Ruiz, lies approximately 30 kilometers (19 mi) to the east.

Known as Colombia's "coffee heart", the town is home to the Buendía coffee factory and Cenicafé, a coffee research center. Because of its close association with coffee production, the municipality was named part of the "Coffee Cultural Landscape" UNESCO World Heritage Site in 2011.

Chinchiná has a mean temperature of approximately 20 degrees Celsius.

== Climate ==
Climate data for Chinchiná (Cenicafe), elevation 1,310 m (4,300 ft), (1971–2000)
Month	Jan	Feb	Mar	Apr	May	Jun	Jul	Aug	Sep	Oct	Nov	Dec	Year
Mean daily maximum °C (°F)	28.0 (82.4)	28.1 (82.6)	28.2 (82.8)	27.5 (81.5)	27.0 (80.6)	27.2 (81.0)	27.8 (82.0)	27.7 (81.9)	27.2 (81.0)	26.5 (79.7)	26.7 (80.1)	27.2 (81.0)	27.4 (81.3)
Daily mean °C (°F)	21.4 (70.5)	21.7 (71.1)	21.7 (71.1)	21.3 (70.3)	21.1 (70.0)	21.2 (70.2)	21.4 (70.5)	21.4 (70.5)	20.9 (69.6)	20.4 (68.7)	20.6 (69.1)	21.0 (69.8)	21.2 (70.2)
Mean daily minimum °C (°F)	16.8 (62.2)	17.0 (62.6)	17.2 (63.0)	17.1 (62.8)	17.1 (62.8)	17.0 (62.6)	16.7 (62.1)	16.7 (62.1)	16.5 (61.7)	16.4 (61.5)	16.6 (61.9)	16.7 (62.1)	16.8 (62.2)
Average precipitation mm (inches)	167.7 (6.60)	154.5 (6.08)	203.3 (8.00)	270.1 (10.63)	266.1 (10.48)	176.6 (6.95)	160.0 (6.30)	168.8 (6.65)	214.4 (8.44)	299.4 (11.79)	256.5 (10.10)	158.1 (6.22)	2,495.5 (98.25)
Average precipitation days	16	15	20	23	24	21	17	19	21	25	22	18	242
Average relative humidity (%)	75	75	76	79	81	79	75	76	78	80	79	78	78
Mean monthly sunshine hours	179.8	144.2	155.0	129.0	124.0	141.0	170.5	164.3	138.0	124.0	138.0	161.2	1,769
Mean daily sunshine hours	5.8	5.1	5.0	4.3	4.0	4.7	5.5	5.3	4.6	4.0	4.6	5.2	4.8
Source: Instituto de Hidrologia Meteorologia y Estudios Ambientales
