= Tolima Department =

Department of Colombia

Department of Tolima Departamento del Tolima
- Department
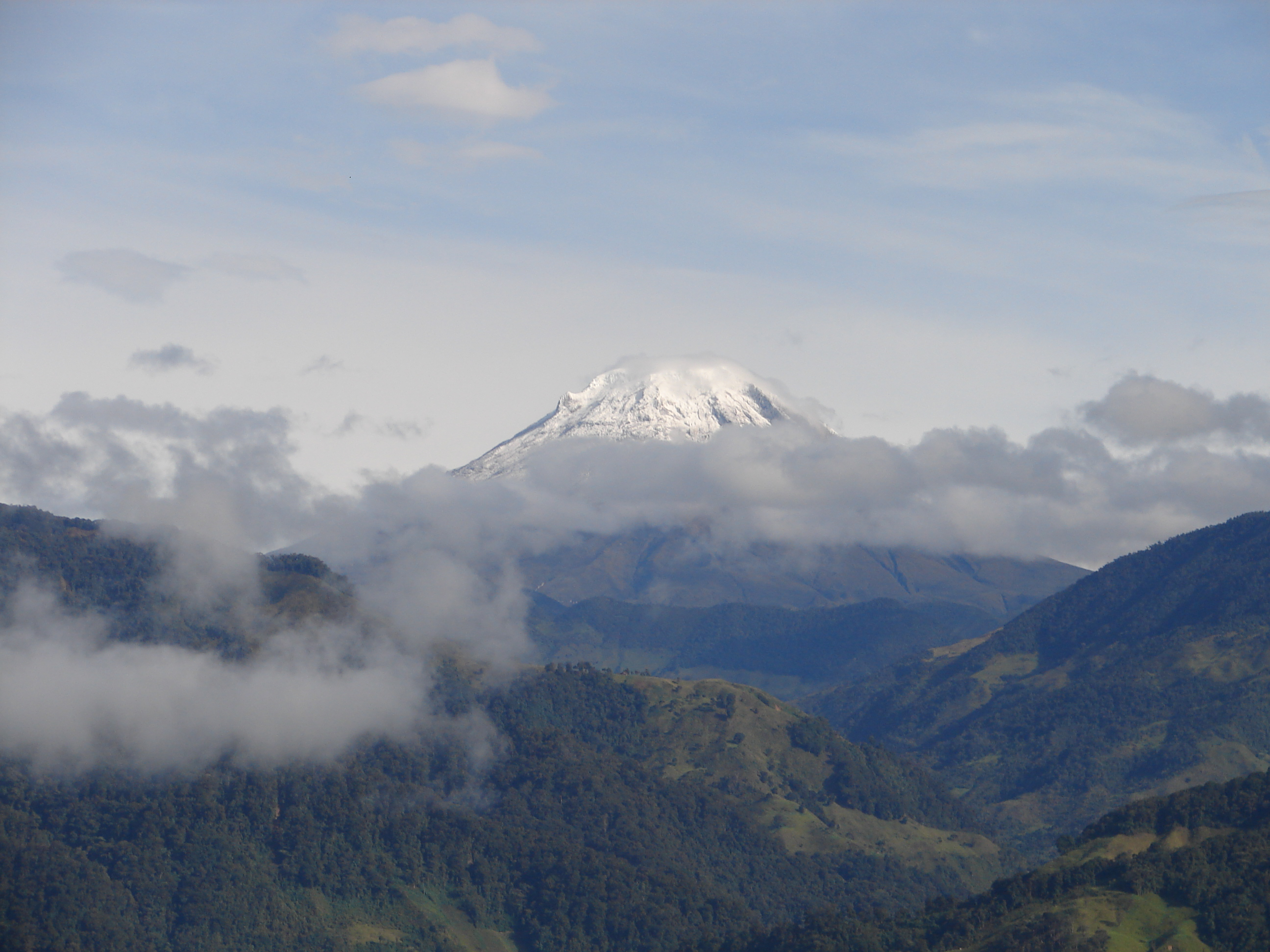
- The Nevado del Tolima

- Flag Coat of arms
- Motto: ¡Tierra firme de Colombia!
- Anthem: Bunde Tolimense
- Tolima shown in red

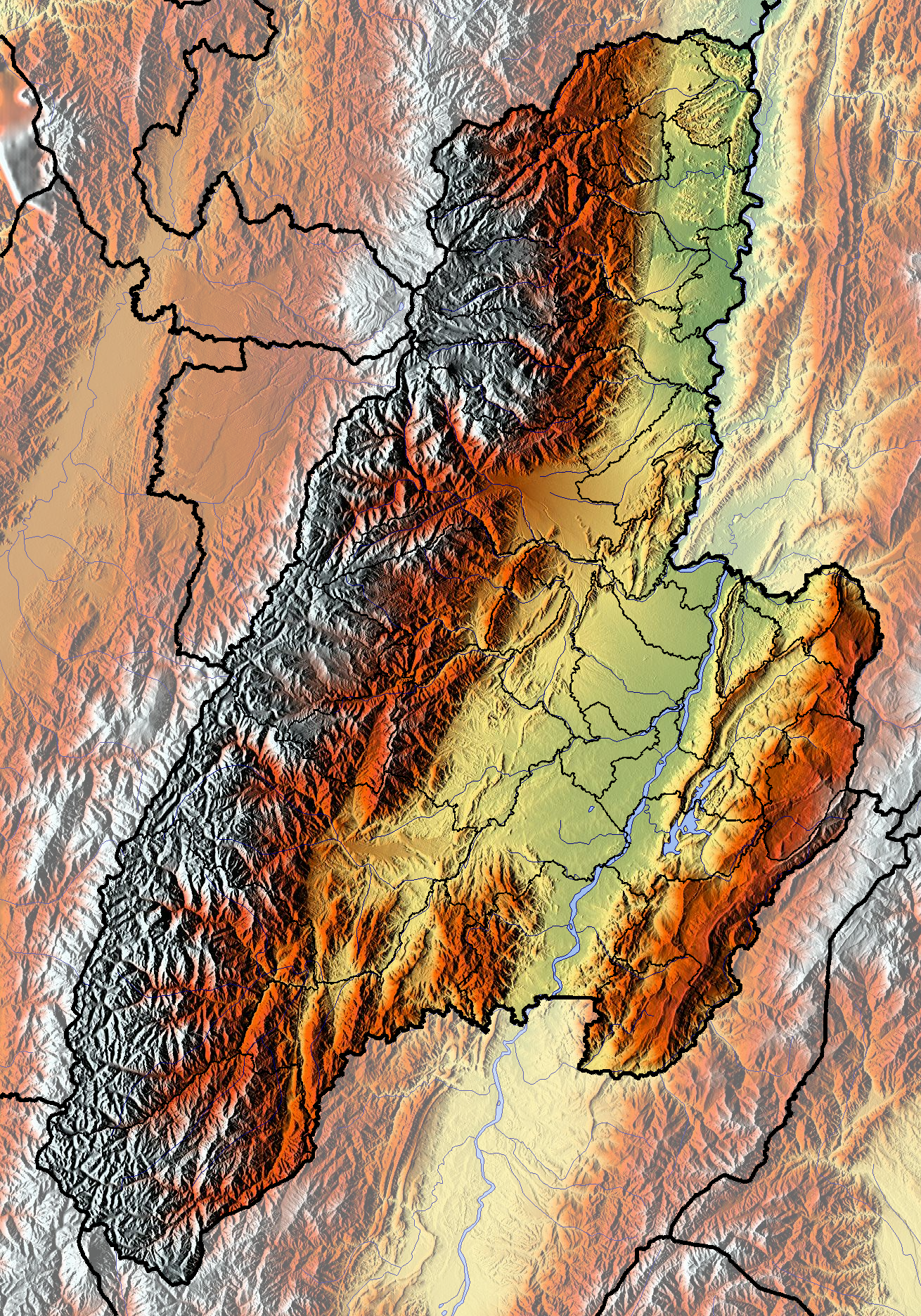
- Topography of the department
- Coordinates: 4°26′N 75°14′W
- Country: Colombia
- Region: Andean Region
- Established: August 4, 1886
- Capital: Ibagué

Government
  - Governor: Adriana Magali Matiz (2023-2027) (Partido Conservador Colombiano)

Area
  - Total: 23,562 km^{2} (9,097 sq mi)
  - Rank: 19th

Population (2018)
  - Total: 1,330,187
  - Rank: 10th
  - Density: 56.455/km^{2} (146.22/sq mi)

GDP
  - Total: COP 30,438 billion (US$ 7.1 billion)
- Time zone: UTC-05
- ISO 3166 code: CO-TOL
- Provinces: 6
- HDI: 0.767 high · 18th of 33
- Website: www.tolima.gov.co

Tolima (Spanish pronunciation: [toˈlima]) is one of the 32 departments of Colombia, located in the Andean region, in the center-west of the country. It is bordered on the north and the west by the department of Caldas; on the east by the department of Cundinamarca; on the south by the department of Huila, and on the west by the departments of Cauca, Valle del Cauca, Quindío and Risaralda. Tolima has a surface area of 23,562 km^{2}, and its capital is Ibagué. The department of Tolima was created in 1861 from a part of what was previously Cundinamarca.

== History ==
=== Indigenous civilization ===
The Pijao inhabited the southern parts of Tolima during pre-Columbian times. The name of the department comes from the Pijao word for "snowed". The Panche, of the same linguistic family as the Pijao, populated the northern regions of Tolima, close to the Magdalena Valley. Renowned as fierce warriors, the Panche were widely known for fighting the Muisca over the control of emerald mining territories. They fought against a Spanish-Muisca coalition and were first defeated in the Battle of Tocarema on 20 August 1538.

=== Spanish colonization ===
Spanish colonization of the region began in 1537 with Sebastián de Belalcázar travelling from the south of later Colombia, where he had founded Cali and Popayán in 1537. He set north to finally reach the area where Gonzalo Jiménez de Quesada had founded Bogotá on 6 August 1538. On its way, De Belalcázar founded the settlement that would become known as Ibagué. De Belalcázar traveled until he reached the settlement of Flandes in Tolima, before heading east towards the Bogotá savanna. Later conquests were executed by captain Andrés Lopez de Galarza, who founded the city of Ibagué and established the municipality of Cajamarca in the west of the department. These two cities would become an important part of the Eje Cafetero ("Coffee Axis").

=== Modern era ===
In 1985, the Armero tragedy occurred in the department. It caused the eruption of the Nevado del Ruiz volcano, destroying the town of Armero. It produced lahars and 23,000 people died in the tragedy.

== Demographics ==
Historical population
Year	Pop.	±%
1973	905,609	—
1985	1,142,220	+26.1%
1993	1,286,078	+12.6%
2005	1,365,342	+6.2%
2018	1,330,187	−2.6%

- Whites and Mestizos (94.46%) Makes it one of the most Eurocentric and less diverse departments in terms of race or ethnicity in the country.
- Amerindian or Indigenous (4.32%) Being the largest Amerindian community the Pijao people.
- African (1.22%) Most of them come from the recent coastal migration to the department.

== Geography ==
=== Physiography ===
Being situated close to the equator, the department of Tolima does not experience seasons, but it does enjoy a variety of different mountainous temperatures: snowy summits more than 5,000 meters high (home to the Las Hermosas and Nevado del Huila National Natural Parks) with below freezing temperatures like the Nevado del Huila and the Nevado del Tolima, and hotter zones in wide valleys lower than 400 meters above sea level that reach temperatures hotter than 40 degrees Celsius. The Tolima department includes three distinct regions: a mountainous region, occupied by the Cordillera Central; a plain, that corresponds to the valleys of the rivers Magdalena and Saldaña; and the region to the southeast which forms the western slope of the Cordillera Oriental, which contains the source of the Cabrera river. These two mountain ranges are separated by the Magdalena Valley, and join back together further south, where the river's head is located.

=== Tectonic plates ===
The greater part of the department of Tolima sits on the Continental Lithospheric Mesoproterozoic Grenville Province, which consists of the Cordillera Central, the Cordillera Oriental, and the mountain ranges of Santa Marta and la Macarena. Most of the territory is situated over Mesozoic deposits of the Late Triassic period (T3) and Early Jurassic (J1).

Volcanic activity is an issue that residents must deal with living in many parts of Tolima, due to its location over various geological faults. In 1985, for example, the Nevado de Ruiz erupted and caused the Armero tragedy, which caused the death of more than 23,000 people and destroyed the town of Armero. The department's capital, Ibagué, is also built near a very large active volcano; the Nevado del Tolima. It stands at 5215 meters (17,110 ft) high, and last erupted in 1943. The Combeima River flows from this mountain and passes by Ibagué, part of which is situated close enough to the river to be put in danger by volcanic flows, should the volcano ever erupt again.

=== Hydrography ===
The territory of Tolima is traversed from the south to north by the Magdalena River, of which the main rivers of the Tolima are tributary. Other rivers are the Saldaña River, the Cabrera, Coello, the Tetuán, the Gualí, the Rio Recio, and the Rio Prado. The Rio Prado dam is found on the river of the same name. This is the largest fresh water lake in central Colombia and is also an important tourist attraction. The Saldaña river is central to farming in the area; it has en area of influence of 9,800 square kilometers; equal to 41.5% of the departamental area, the longest reach in Tolima, and has the best flow to its irrigation district. It feeds into the crops in the cities of Saldaña and Purificación, as well as its tributaries; the Cucuana, Luisa, and Amoya rivers.

== Economy ==
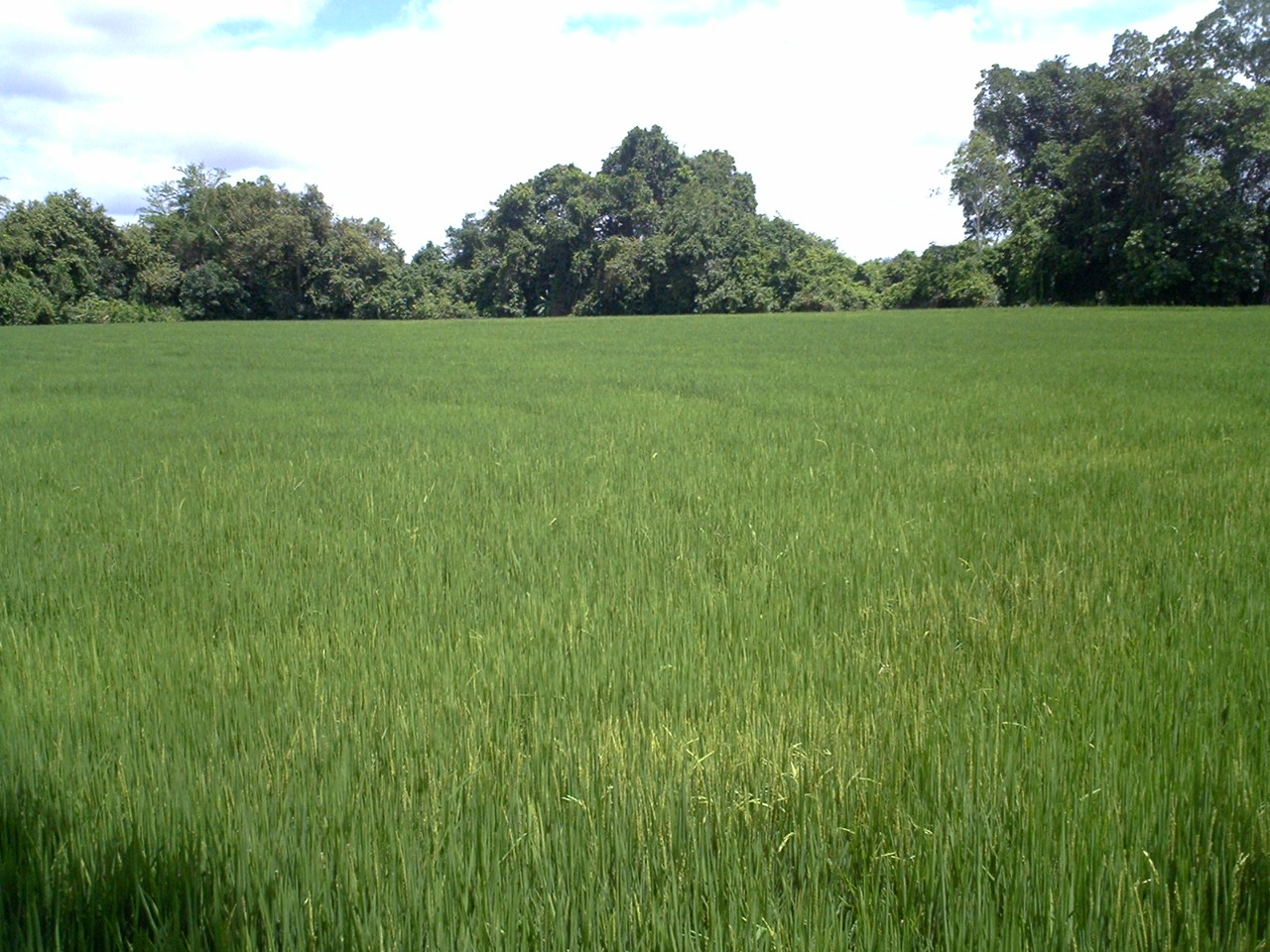
Plantation of rice in Saldaña

The economy of the Tolima is based on agriculture.

Industry in Tolima, as has been happening to the whole country, has been declining in its proportion of GDP, while services gain more importance, a phenomenon known as deindustrialization. Within the sector services Tolima excels in commerce, public administration, other services to the community and "reparaciones", which contribute respectively 11.2% and 9.1% of the GDP.

The GDP per inhabitant in Tolima, registered during 2002 a reduction of 0.4% in constant prices.

According to the results of the DANE census, the department of Tolima registered between the years of 2001 and 2002 a diminution, to constant prices, of 0.1% in its GDP, falling from Col$2.05 trillion in 2001 to Col$2.04 trillion in 2002. The result is explained by the fact that traditional sectors within the economic structure of the department such as the coffee registered a reduction of 22.4%, reducing 2 percentage points to the total variation, and others did not have important growth or presented/displayed diminutions in its added values. So it is the case of the activity branches: transport, commerce and repairs, industry and electricity gas and water, which jointly reduced 1.7 percentage points to the variation, whereas other services, rights and taxes, construction and farming rest, forestry and 3.6 percentage points fish were the branches with greater positive contribution to the variation of the GDP when contributing.

== Culture ==
=== Music and the Arts ===
Music is the distinguishing cultural expression of Tolima. Its capital, Ibagué, is well known as "the musical city of Colombia", and is home to one of the nation's classic conservatoriums. The department also is famous for the Fiestas of San Pedro in Espinal, San Juan in Natagaima and in Ibagué, the Colombian Folkloric Festival and the "Concurso de Duetos Garzón y Collazos."

Tolima has produced many writers: Arturo Camacho Ramíez, Juan Lozano y Lozano, Diego Fallon, William Ospina, James Cañón, Martín Pomala, Luz Stella; painters: Darío Jiménez, Jorge Elías Triana, Darío Ortiz Robledo, Carlos Granada, Julio Fajardo; historians Eduardo Santa, Gonzalo Sanchez, Hermes Tovar Pinzón, Hernán Clavijo, Darío Ortiz Vidales.

=== Gastronomy ===
The department is also widely recognised for its distinctive cuisine. Famous regional dishes include the Tamal Tolimense, a rice- and yellow pea-based dish with pork, egg, chicken, beef and vegetable filling, wrapped inside a plantain leaf; the Lechona, a yellow pea-and-meat-stuffed pork; Empanadas, small potato, rice and meat stuffed pastries, made with corn dough; Achiras (although not exclusively from this department) and Bizcocho calentano, smaller flour pastries; and Quesillo, a type of cheese wrapped in a plantain leaf. Drinks include the Avena, a cold oatmeal-based drink.

=== Other ===
Tolima gave to the country ten presidents: Domingo Caycedo, José María Melo, Manuel Murillo Toro, José María Rojas Garrido, Miguel Abadía Méndez, Alfonso López Michelsen, Darío Echandía, Carlos Lozano y Lozano, Gabriel París, and Deogracias Fonseca.

== Municipalities ==
The Department of Tolima groups its municipalities into six zones: northern, eastern, southern, center, southeastern and snowy.

Municipalities of Tolima

- Center
  - Alvarado
  - Anzoategui
  - Cajamarca
  - Coello
  - Espinal
  - Flandes
  - Ibague
  - Piedras
  - Rovira
  - San Luis
  - Valle de San Juan
- Snowy
  - Casabianca
  - Herveo
  - Lerida
  - Libano
  - Murillo
  - Santa Isabel
  - Venadillo
  - Villahermosa
- Northern
  - Ambalema
  - Armero
  - Falan
  - Fresno
  - Honda
  - Mariquita
  - Palocabildo
- Eastern
  - Carmen de Apicalá
  - Cunday
  - Icononzo
  - Melgar
  - Villarrica
- Southern
  - Ataco
  - Chaparral
  - Coyaima
  - Natagaima
  - Ortega
  - Planadas
  - Rioblanco
  - Roncesvalles
  - San Antonio
- Southeastern
  - Alpujarra
  - Dolores
  - Guamo
  - Prado
  - Purificacion
  - Saldana
  - Suarez

== See also ==
- Alberto Castilla (1878-1937), founder of the Conservatory of the Tolima, and composer of the Hymn of Tolima Department
- Coat of arms of Tolima Department
