= 1951 in Colombia =

- Decades: 1930s; 1940s; 1950s; 1960s; 1970s
- See also: Other events of 1951; Timeline of Colombian history

Events of 1951 in Colombia.

== Incumbents ==
- President:
  - Laureano Gómez (1950–1953).
  - Roberto Urdaneta Arbeláez (1951–1953). (Note: Gómez would step down on 5 November 1951 due to health concerns, leaving Roberto Urdaneta Arbeláez as acting president until the 1953 coup.)
- Vice President: N/A. (Note: The Office of the Vice President was officially abolished by the 1905 National Constituent Assembly on 28 March 1905, and it was only reinstituted after the ratification of the new 1991 Constitution and filled in the following presidential elections in 1994.)

== Events ==
=== Ongoing ===
- La Violencia.

=== January ===
- 8 January – The club Deportes Quindío founded in Armenia.
- 5–17 January – The very first Vuelta a Colombia is held, beginning in Bogotá on the 5th.On the 17th, Efraín Forero Triviño of Cundinamarca wins.

=== March ===
- 25 March – The Colombian government announced import controls on over 2000 items, including cars and other luxuries, to suppress black market trading.

=== May ===
- 9 May –The 1951 population census of the state of Antioquia is held.
- 24 May – La Gran Colombia University founded.

=== June ===
- 15 June – Colombian Battalion is deployed to Busan.

=== August ===
- 25 August – Ecopetrol is founded as Empresa Colombiana de Petróleos S.A. (English:Colombian Petroleum Company).

=== September ===
- 16 September – 1951 Colombian parliamentary election.

=== October ===
- 25 October – The International Federation of Association Football (FIFA) disaffiliates Colombia.
- 28 October – President Gomez is hospitalized after having a heart attack, which leaves him partially paralyzed for the rest of his life.

=== November ===
- 5 November – Roberto Urdaneta Arbeláez becomes acting President of Colombia.

=== Uncertain ===
- The 1951 Campeonato Profesional is won by the Millonarios F.C.

== Births ==
=== January ===
- 6 January – Gustavo Zalamea, artist (d. 2011).

=== February ===
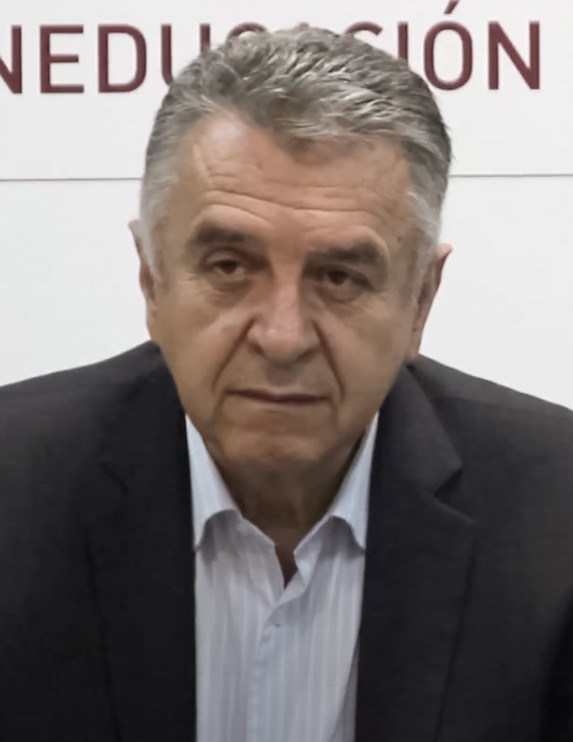
Luis Eduardo Garzon (2015)

- 6 February – Darío Gómez, musician (d. 2022).
- 11 February – Luis Eduardo Garzón, politician.

=== March ===
- 12 March – Diego Umaña, footballer.
- 17 March – Carmenza Duque, singer and actress.

=== April ===
- 22 April – José Fernando Castro, lawyer and politician (d. 2008).

=== May ===
- 8 May – Ricardo Tobón Restrepo, archbishop of Medellín.
- 21 May – William Vinasco Chamorro, sports journalist.

Carlos Pizarro (1990)

=== June ===
- 6 June – Carlos Pizarro Leongómez, politician and guerilla (d. 1990).
- 18 June – Juan Piña, singer and songwriter.

=== August ===
- 1 August – Constanza Duque, actress.
- 10 August – Juan Manuel Santos, politician and 32nd President of Colombia.
- 23 August – Cholo Valderrama, joropo musician and songwriter.
- 24 August – Hélmer Herrera, drug trafficker (d. 1998).
- 30 August – Wilson Saoko, musician.

=== September ===
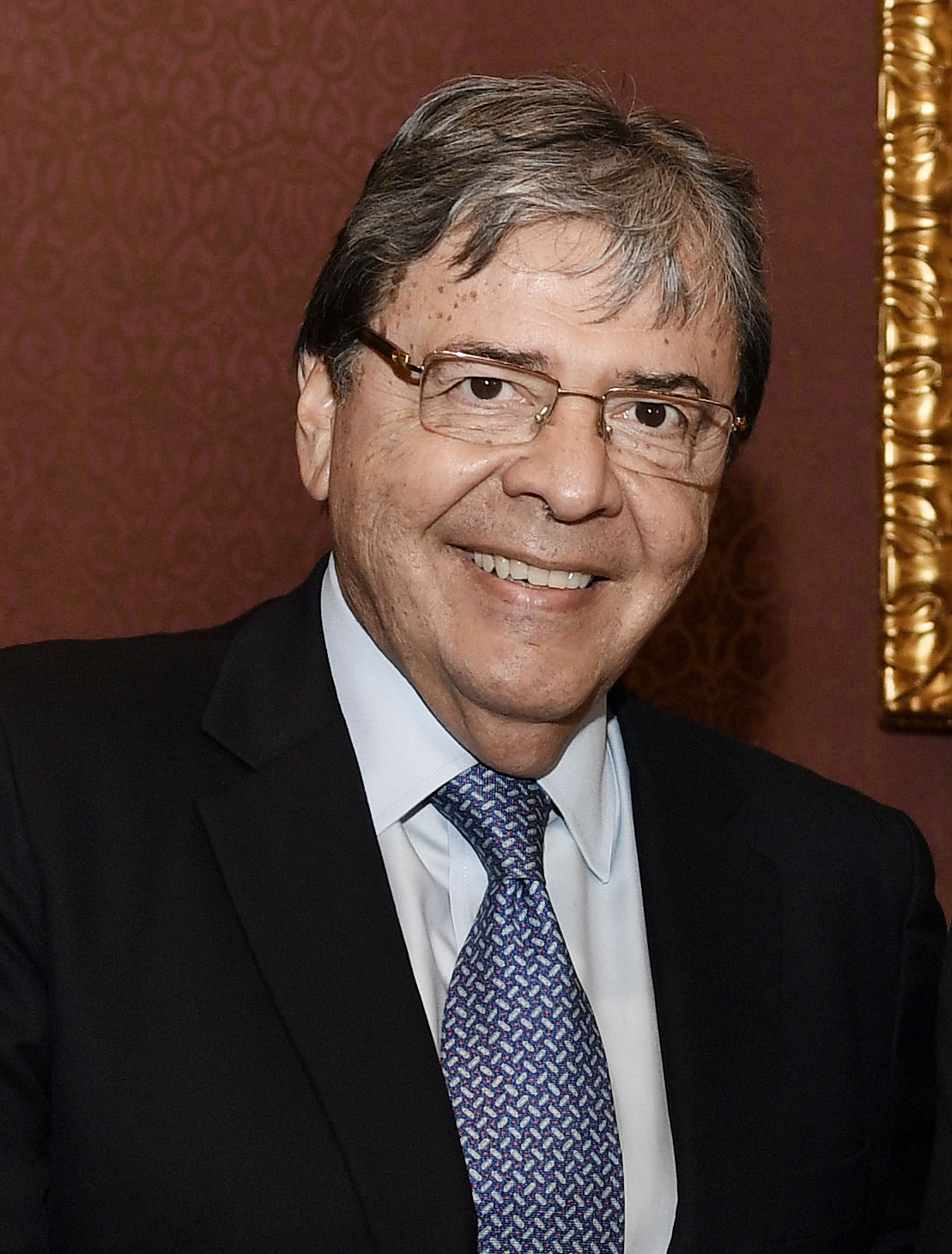
Carlos Holmes Trujillo (2018)

- 18 September – Poncho Zuleta, vallenato musician.
- 23 September – Carlos Holmes Trujillo, politician, lawyer, and former Minister of National Defense (d. 2021).
- 29 September – Andrés Caicedo, writer (d. 1977).

=== October ===
- 15 October – Miguel Alfonso Murillo, actor (d. 2017).
- 28 October – Rodrigo Obregón, actor (d. 2019).

=== November ===
- 23 November – Margarita Londoño Vélez, writer (d. 2021).

=== December ===
- 31 December – Fernando Jaramillo Paredes, orchestra director and musician (d. 2014).

== Deaths ==
- 9 January – Julio Torres Mayorga, musician and songwriter (b. 1929)
- 8 October – Joaquín Casas Castañeda, politician and former Minister of National Education (b. 1866).
- unknown date – Cesar Uribe Piedrahita, doctor and writer (b. 1897)
