= 1955 in Colombia =

- Decades: 1930s; 1940s; 1950s; 1960s; 1970s
- See also: Other events of 1955; Timeline of Colombian history

Events of 1955 in Colombia.

== Incumbents ==
- President: Gustavo Rojas Pinilla (1953–1957).
- Vice President: N/A. (Note: The Office of the Vice President was officially abolished by the 1905 National Constituent Assembly on 28 March 1905, and it was only reinstituted after the ratification of the new 1991 Constitution and filled in the following presidential elections in 1994.)

== Events ==
=== Ongoing ===
- La Violencia.

=== January ===
- 9 January – The National Action Movement (Movimiento de Acción Nacional, MAN), the political party of Gustavo Rojas Pinilla, is created.

=== May ===
- 21 May – The 1955 Vuelta a Colombia begins.

=== June ===
- 12 June – The 1955 Vuelta a Colombia ends, Ramón Hoyos comes in first place overall.

=== August ===
- 4 August – The newspaper El Tiempo is closed.

=== November ===
- 12 November – The 1955 Señorita Colombia is held.
- 30 November – The internal debt of Colombia reaches 880 million pesos, a rise from 489 million at the end of 1954.

=== Uncertain ===
- Guerra de Villarica (Tolima).
- Creation of Mito Magazine.
- Esperanza Gallón Domínguez Elegida Señorita Colombia 1955.
- Independiente Medellín wins the 1955 Campeonato Profesional.
- Liberal and Communist guerrillas form an alliance.
- Colombia and Czechoslovakia establish consular relations.
- Rojas Pinilla orders a military offensive against rearmed peasants, triggering a confrontation known as the "Guerra de Villarrica" (War of Villarrica) which took place in the central town of Villarrica in Tolima Department.

== Births ==
- 25 January – Piedad Córdoba, politician (d. 2024)
- 15 March – Andrés París, guerrilla and politician
- 18 March – Pabla Flores, bullerengue singer
- 23 March – Rosa Navarro, mixed media artist
- 9 May – Ernesto Báez, paramilitary leader

== Deaths ==
- 12 May – Carolina Vásquez Uribe, 85, first lady of Colombia (1922-1926) as wife of Pedro Nel Ospina (b. 1869).
- 24 September – Eusebio Ochoa, musician and composer (b. 1880)
