= 1954 in Colombia =

- Decades: 1930s; 1940s; 1950s; 1960s; 1970s
- See also: Other events of 1954; Timeline of Colombian history

Events of 1954 in Colombia.

== Incumbents ==
- President: Gustavo Rojas Pinilla (1953–1957).
- Vice President: N/A. (Note: The Office of the Vice President was officially abolished by the 1905 National Constituent Assembly on 28 March 1905, and it was only reinstituted after the ratification of the new 1991 Constitution and filled in the following presidential elections in 1994.)

== Events ==
=== Ongoing ===
- La Violencia
- 1954 Campeonato Profesional (April–October)

=== January ===
- 12 January – Vuelta a Colombia 1954:The 4th Vuelta a Colombia begins in Bogotá.
- 31 January – Vuelta a Colombia 1954: Ramón Hoyos Vallejo wins the 4th Vuelta a Colombia.

=== May ===
- 1 May – The first test of television in Colombia is conducted, transmitting signals between Bogotá and Manizales.
- 16 May – The Hipódromo de Techo is founded in Bogotá.

=== June ===
- 8–9 June – 1954 Bogotá student massacre: 11 university students protesting the killing of Uriel Gutiérrez Restrepo by the National Police are killed by the Colombian Battalion.
- 11 June – León Droz Blanco, a military officer and dissident of the Marcos Pérez Jiménez dictatorship, is assassinated in Barranquilla, where he was in exile from his native Venezuela.
- 13 June – Television is officially inaugurated in Colombia.

=== August ===
- 15 August – The old Salt Cathedral of Zipaquirá is inaugurated.

=== September ===
- 9 September – The National Secretariat for Social Assistance is created.

=== Uncertain ===
- The Estadio Departamental Libertad is inaugurated.

== Deaths ==
- 8 June – Uriel Gutiérrez Restrepo, 23, University student and activist (b. 1929).
