= 1953 in Colombia =

- Decades: 1930s; 1940s; 1950s; 1960s; 1970s
- See also: Other events of 1953; Timeline of Colombian history

Events of 1953 in Colombia.

== Incumbents ==
- President:
  - Laureano Gómez (1950–13 June 1953).
  - Roberto Urdaneta Arbeláez (Acting; 1951–13 June 1953).
  - Gustavo Rojas Pinilla (13 June 1953 – 1957).
- Vice President: N/A. (Note: The Office of the Vice President was officially abolished by the 1905 National Constituent Assembly on 28 March 1905, and it was only reinstituted after the ratification of the new 1991 Constitution and filled in the following presidential elections in 1994.)

== Events ==
=== Ongoing ===
- La Violencia.

=== January ===
- 1 January – Liberal rebel groups attack the Palanquero Air Base with the hope of taking its jet planes and bombing Bogotá to force the resignation of Roberto Urdaneta Arbeláez/Laureano Gómez.

=== March ===
- 8 March – Ramón Hoyos wins the 5th Vuelta a Colombia in Bogotá, having started the final in Girardot.
- 15 March – 1953 Colombian parliamentary election.

=== April ===
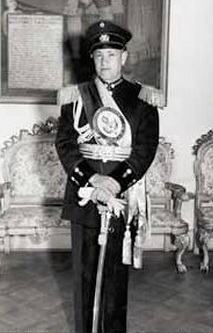
General Gustavo Rojas Pinilla

- 9 April – Unión Magdalena is formed.
- 16 April – The Ministry of Hygiene completes its transition into the new Ministry of Public Health, being officially renamed via Decree 984 of 1953 (Spanish: Decreto 984 de 1953).

=== June ===
- 13 June – 1953 Colombian coup d'état: General Gustavo Rojas Pinilla initiates a bloodless military coup d'état, seizing power at the Casa de Nariño from acting president Roberto Urdaneta Arbeláez and official president Laureano Gómez.

=== October ===
- 10 October – The Pedagogical and Technological University of Colombia is established in Tunja, Boyacá.
- 14 October – The National Administrative Department of Statistics (DANE) is established.
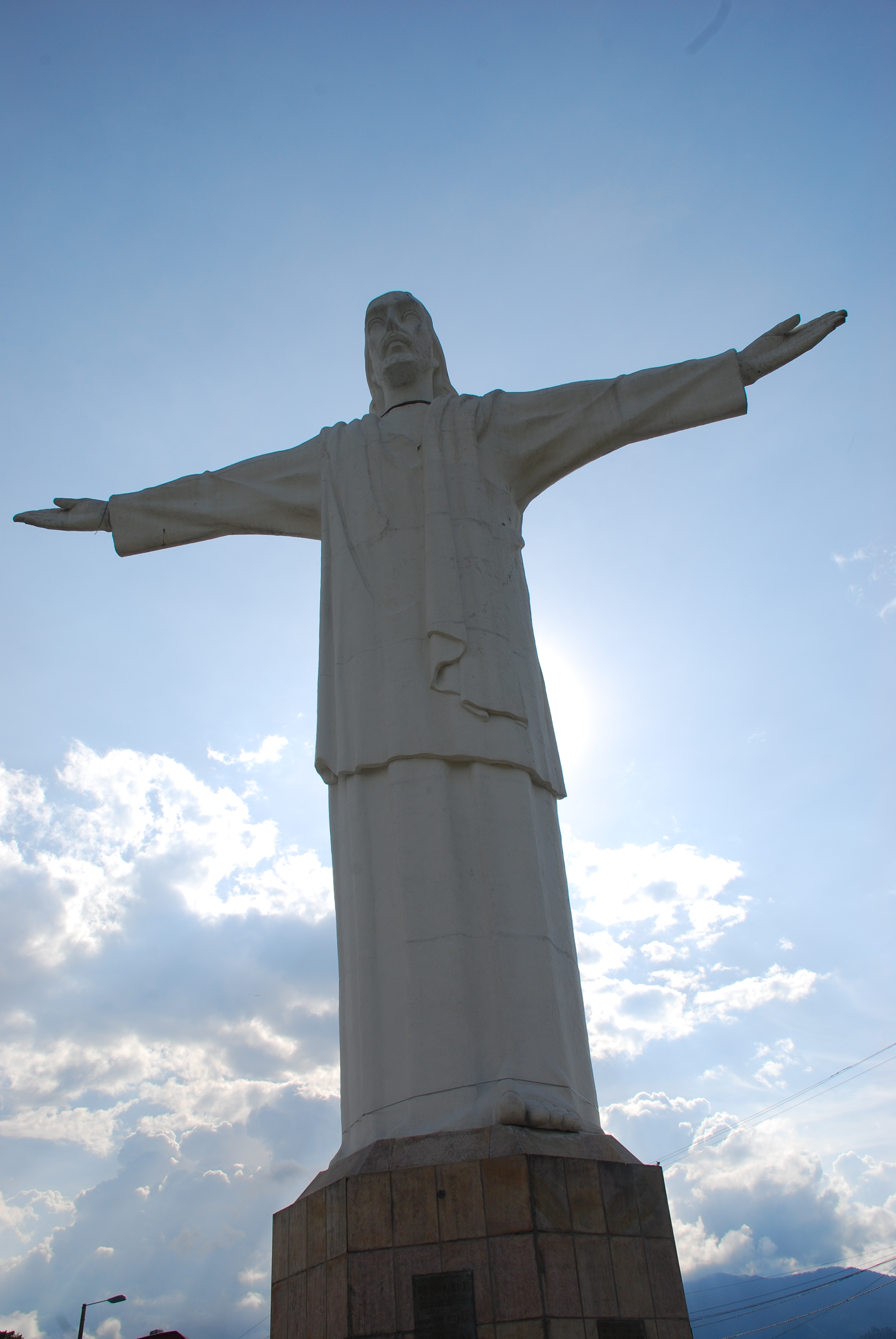
  The Cristo Rey Statue in Cali (2009)
- 25 October – The Cristo Rey is inaugurated in Cali.

=== Uncertain ===
- Canada establishes full diplomatic relations with Colombia.
- The Antonio Nariño and Alejandro Gutiérrez National Police Academies, in Barranquilla and Manizales respectively, open.
- Luz Marina Cruz Lozada wins Miss Colombia 1953.
- 1953 Campeonato Profesional
- The Confederación Nacional del Trabajo is established.
- The Marymount International School Barranquilla is established.

== Births ==
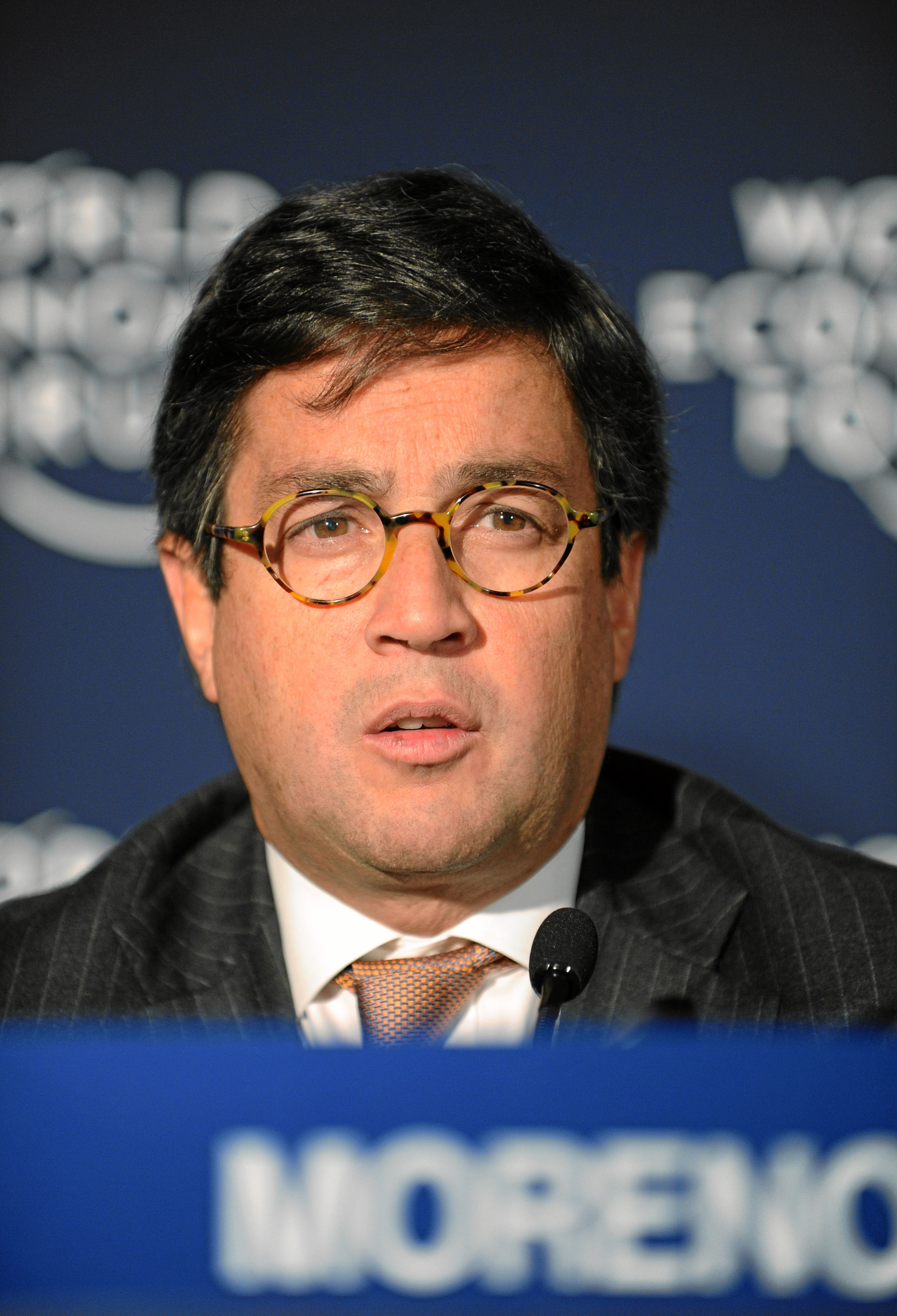
Luis Alberto Moreno in 2011

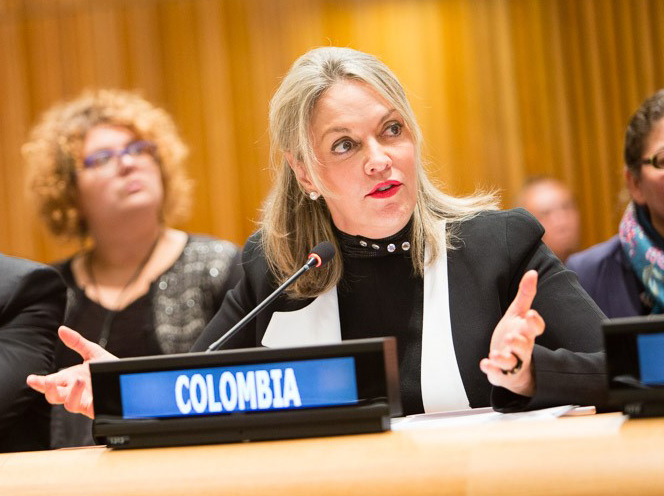
María Emma Mejía Vélez in 2015

- 19 March – Pablo Catatumbo, politician and FARC leader.
- 3 May – Luis Alberto Moreno, businessman and diplomat.
- 15 August – Paulo Laserna Phillips, journalist, businessman, and political scientist.
- 27 September – María Emma Mejía Vélez, politician, diplomat, and journalist.

== Deaths ==
- 8 May – Alejandro Ángel Escobar, businessmen and former Minister of Agriculture (b. 1903).
- 6 October – Miguel Rasch Isla, erotic writer and poet (b. 1887).
