= 1952 in Colombia =

- Decades: 1930s; 1940s; 1950s; 1960s; 1970s
- See also: Other events of 1952; Timeline of Colombian history

Events of 1952 in Colombia.

== Incumbents ==
- President:
  - Laureano Gómez Castro (1950–1953).
  - Roberto Urdaneta Arbeláez (Acting; 1950–1953).
- Vice President: N/A. (Note: The Office of the Vice President was officially abolished by the 1905 National Constituent Assembly on 28 March 1905, and it was only reinstituted after the ratification of the new 1991 Constitution and filled in the following presidential elections in 1994.)

== Events ==
=== Ongoing ===
- La Violencia.

=== January ===
- 12–27 January – Vuelta a Colombia 1952 is held, José Beyaert wins.

=== March ===
- 30 March – The football club Millonarios defeats Real Madrid 4–2 at Santiago Bernabéu Stadium in Madrid, Spain.

=== July ===
- 12 July – Ambush of El Turpial

=== September ===
- 6 September – Incendios del 6 de septiembre de 1952 en Bogotá

=== November ===
- 22 November – Colombia officially recognizes Venezuelan sovereignty over Los Monjes Archipelago.

=== December ===
- 9 December – The president assembles a National Constituent Assembly to reform the constitution.

=== Uncertain ===
- The first Conference of the Popular National Liberation Movement (Conferencia del Movimiento Popular de Liberación Nacional) is held in Viotá.

== Births ==
- 25 March – Antanas Mockus, mathematician and politician.
- 21 May – Fabri Meriño, vallenato accordionist (d. 1971).
- 4 July – Álvaro Uribe, 31st President of Colombia.
- 13 September – Ernesto Díaz, footballer (d. 2002).
- 17 September – Rafael Salas, vallenato accordionist (d. 2011).
- 9 November – Ricardo Cardona, boxer (d. 2015).
- 18 November – León Zuleta, LGBT rights activist, writer, and professor (d. 1993).
- 28 November – Alicia Barney, artist.

== Deaths ==
- 22 July – Jorge Áñez, musician and songwriter (b.1892)
- 22 November – Antonio María Ferro Bermúdez, poet (b.1875)
