= 1950 in Colombia =

- Decades: 1930s; 1940s; 1950s; 1960s; 1970s
- See also: Other events of 1950; Timeline of Colombian history

Events of 1950 in Colombia.

== Incumbents ==
- President:
  - Mariano Ospina Pérez (1946–1950).
  - Laureano Gómez (1950–1953). (Note: Gómez would step down in 1951 due to health concerns, leaving Roberto Urdaneta Arbeláez as acting president until the 1953 coup.)
- Vice President: N/A. (Note: The Office of the Vice President was officially abolished by the 1905 National Constituent Assembly on 28 March 1905, and it was only reinstituted after the ratification of the new 1991 Constitution and filled in the following presidential election of 1994.)

== Events ==
=== Ongoing ===
- La Violencia

=== January ===
- 4 January – A decree is passed amending petroleum law.

=== February ===
- 1 February – The Universidad de Medellín is founded.

=== March ===
- 17 March – 1950 Campeonato Profesional: The División Mayor del Fútbol Profesional Colombiano (DIMAYOR) announces that all teams in the tournament must wear jersey numbers and follow the predetermined times for matches from now on.

=== June ===
- 4 June – The original date of the Presidential Election; it was moved up to 27 November 1949.

=== July ===
- 1 July – 1950 Campeonato Profesional: A game between the Huracán and América clubs ends in a 6–6 draw.

=== August ===
- 7 August – Laureano Gómez of the Conservative Party becomes the 18th President of Colombia.

=== October ===
- 14 October – Copa Colombia tournament is founded.

=== November ===
- 20 November – The International Court of Justice hands down their decision on Colombia v. Peru or the Asylum case, siding with Peru. This allows Peru to deny Víctor Raúl Haya de la Torre, leader of the American People's Revolutionary Alliance, safe passage to political asylum in Colombia.

== Births ==
- date unknown – Daniel Bermúdez, architect.
- 5 January – Adolfo Andrade, footballer.
- 18 January – Blanca Caldas a.k.a. Claudia de Colombia, singer and actress.
- 9 March – Diana Turbay, journalist and kidnapping victim (d. 1991).
- 18 March – Tomás González, author.
- 1 April – Andrés Uriel Gallego, civil engineer, politician, and 8th Minister of Transport (d. 2014).
- 20 April – Sergio Cabrera, film director.
- 3 August – Ernesto Samper, politician and 29th President of Colombia.
- 10 December – Antonio Caro, artist and social advocate (d. 2021).
- 28 December – Elberto López, accordionist (d. 2007)

== Deaths ==
- date unknown – Arturo Acevedo Vallarino, film director (b. 1873).
