= 1956 in Colombia =

- Decades: 1930s; 1940s; 1950s; 1960s; 1970s
- See also: Other events of 1956; Timeline of Colombian history

Events of 1956 in Colombia.

== Incumbents ==
- President: Gustavo Rojas Pinilla (1953–1957).
- Vice President: N/A. (Note: The Office of the Vice President was officially abolished by the 1905 National Constituent Assembly on 28 March 1905, and it was only reinstituted after the ratification of the new 1991 Constitution and filled in the following presidential elections in 1994.)

== Events ==
=== Ongoing ===
- La Violencia.

=== January ===
- 26 January – The Administrative Department of the Presidency of the Republic is formed.

=== February ===
- 5 February – Clashes between the government police and protesters result in the deaths of nine people.

=== March ===
- 22 March – The comedy TV show Yo y tú airs for the first time.

=== June ===
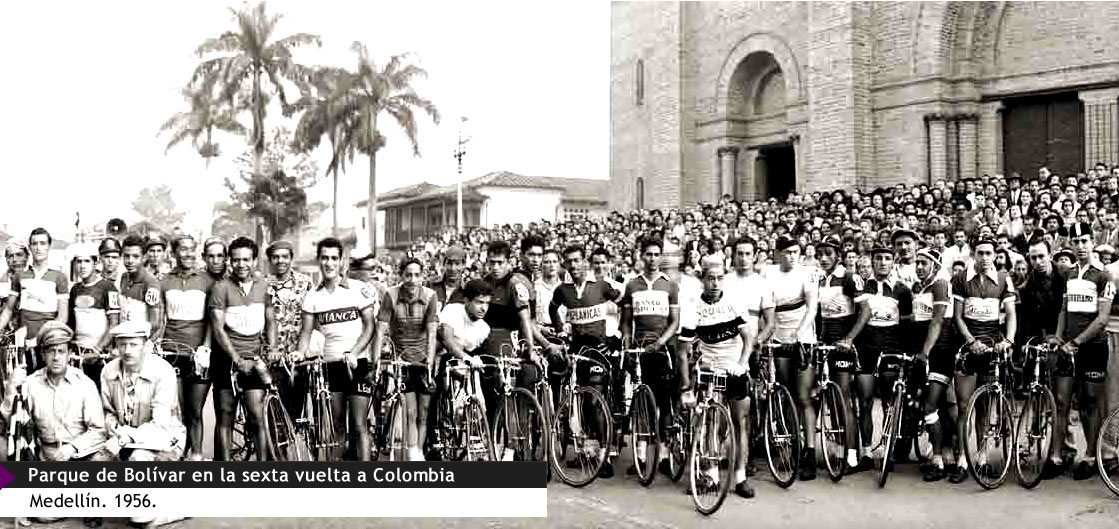
1956 Vuelta a Colombia participants in Bolívar Park, Medellín

- 7–24 June – 1956 Vuelta a Colombia
- 24 June – The Colombian Conservative Party (PCC) and Colombian Liberal Party (PLC) sign the Pact of Benidorm, an agreement that establishes the National Front.

=== August ===
- 7 August – Seven army ammunition trucks filled with dynamite explode in Cali, killing more than 1,000 people.

=== November ===
- 22 November – Colombia participates in the Olympics for the fourth time at the 1956 Summer Olympics.

=== Uncertain ===
- 1956 Campeonato Profesional
- The Cartagena Refinery is built.
- Caritas Colombia is created.
