= Alberto Ruiz Novoa =

Colombian military officer and politician

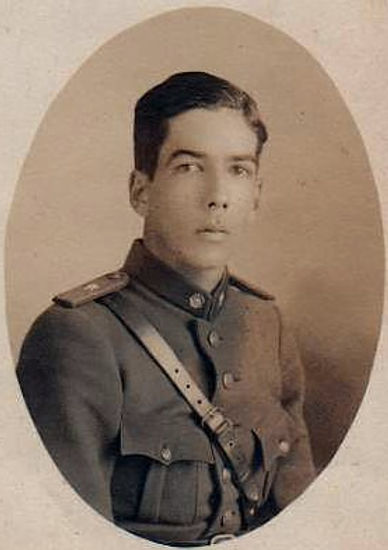
- Alberto Ruiz Novoa
- Born: January 3, 1917; Bucaramanga, Colombia
- Died: January 14, 2017 (aged 100); Bogotá, Colombia
- Education: Military School of Cadets
- Occupations: Military and politician
- Years active: 1933–1965
- Spouse: Gloria
- Parent(s): Pedro Ruiz, Elena María Novoa
- Awards: Order of Military Merit (무공훈장) Bronze Star Medal

Minister of War of Colombia
- In office 7 August 1962 – 27 January 1965
- President: Guillermo León Valencia
- Preceded by: Rafael Hernández Pardo
- Succeeded by: Gabriel Revéiz Pizarro

Commander of the National Army of Colombia
- In office September 1960 – August 1962
- President: Alberto Lleras Camargo
- Preceded by: Jorge Villamizar Flórez
- Succeeded by: Jaime Fajardo Pinzón

Comptroller General of the Republic of Colombia
- In office November 1953 – September 1958
- President: Gustavo Rojas Pinilla; Military Junta of Government
- Preceded by: Hernando Escallón Vargas
- Succeeded by: Jesús María Murgueitio

Commander of the Colombia Battalion
- President: Roberto Urdaneta and Gustavo Rojas Pinilla
- Preceded by: Jaime Polanía Puyo
- Succeeded by: Position abolished

Alberto Ruiz Novoa (born in Bucaramanga on January 3, 1917 – died in Bogotá on January 14, 2017) was a Colombian military officer and politician. As an infantry officer, he served as Minister of War during the administration of Guillermo León Valencia.

== Biography ==
Alberto was born in Bucaramanga on January 3, 1917, the son of Pedro Ruiz and Elena María Novoa. He married Gloria Espinosa González, and they were the parents of Claudia Jimena Gloria, Javier Alberto, and Sergio Andrés Ruiz Espinosa.

In June 1951, as commander of the Infantry School in Usaquén, the Commander of the National Army, Colonel Mariano Ospina Rodríguez, appointed him to replace Lieutenant Colonel Jaime Polanía Puyo at the head of the Colombian Battalion in Korea as a member of the UN Multinational Force that participated in the Korean War.

In March 1953, after surviving an attack by the Chinese army during the Battle of Hill 180, then-Lieutenant Colonel Ruiz-Novoa received the American Bronze Star for rescuing a patrol near the 38th parallel on January 24 of that same year. The medal was awarded in a ceremony at the front line by American General Arthur G. Trudeau. Ruiz-Novoa criticized the US Army for sending all its reinforcements to the Battle of Pork Chop Hill, leaving the Colombian Battalion abandoned, which fought until it ran out of ammunition and lost 20% of its forces.

In March 1958, he was promoted to Brigadier General, and on December 14, 1960, he was appointed Commander of the National Army of Colombia. In June 1961, he was promoted to Major General, and on August 7, 1962, he was appointed Minister of War.

=== Awards ===
- Order of Military Merit (무공훈장) (2nd Class - Eulji Cordon (을지)) (Note: Sometimes spelt Ulchi) (ROK) – 24 June 1953
- Bronze Star Medal (USA) – 24 January 1953

== Politics ==
He was appointed Minister of War by President Guillermo León Valencia from 1962 to 1965. During his time in the Ministry of War, Ruiz-Novoa created a command of 7,500 men specially trained to infiltrate the civilian population and carry out psychological warfare operations. In an interview, Ruiz-Novoa said that the army was using propaganda and "psychological warfare techniques to teach the population to love the armed forces and to see the armed forces as a solution to their everyday problems."

In 1964, under the direction of Ruiz-Novoa, the armed forces carried out an offensive against the Republic of Marquetalia with the help of the United States. This operation cost 30 million dollars and used counter-insurgency techniques, psychological warfare, and civil action.

During the National Front, he was one of the promoters of Plan Lazo or Laso, designed to combat Pedro Antonio Marín Marín alias "Manuel Marulanda Vélez" or Tirofijo and Luis Alberto Morantes alias "Jacobo Arenas," founders of the Revolutionary Armed Forces of Colombia (FARC).

On January 27, 1965, General Ruiz was removed from his position by President Guillermo León Valencia.
