= Operation Nomad-Polar =

Military operation during the Korean War

- Part of Korean War
Date	13 October 1951
Location	Korean Peninsula

Belligerents
South Korea; United Nations; United States	North Korea; China

Units involved
(United States) 24th Infantry Division; (First Republic of Korea) 2nd Infantry Division; (First Republic of Korea) 6th Infantry Division	

Operation Nomad-Polar was an Allied offensive during the Korean War.
