= Cesar Uribe Piedrahita =

César Uribe Piedrahita (1897–1951) was a Colombian doctor and writer. He was born in Medellín. He was little published in his lifetime, but was highly regarded in Colombian literary circles in the first half of the 20th century. Apart from being a writer, he had several other identities: medical surgeon, archaeologist, artist, public health pioneer, etc. He was the director of the National Institute of Hygiene and taught parasitology at the University of Cauca, where he went on to serve as rector. He published novels such as Toá, Narraciones de Caucherías (1933), Mancha de aceite (1936), Sebastián de las Gracias and the incomplete Caribe.
