= Rosa Navarro =

Colombian artist (born 1955)

- Born: Rosa Navarro Barandica; 23 March 1955 (age 70); Barranquilla, Colombia
- Known for: Artwork
- Parents: Carlos Navarro Orozco (father); Rosa María Barandica (mother)

Rosa Navarro Barandica (born 23 March 1955, Barranquilla), is a Colombian photographer and mixed-media artist.

== Career ==
The daughter of Carlos Navarro Orozco and Rosa María Barandica, Rosa Navarro was exposed to the arts since her birth as her mother was an artist who worked with several mediums. At an early age, Navarro began to learn and draw the human body on the wet sand which was in her home's patio. She also utilized wood, box cartons and clay, where she would get it from her father's ladrilleria (brick gallery).

Navarro began creating work in the 1980s that explored the semiotic meaning of her first name, Rosa, which in Spanish means both "rose" and "pink." The photographs from this period are self-portraits.

Navarro exhibited in Columbia in the 1980s and 90s and won several awards including winning second place at the first Salón Colombo-americano in 1982. Navarro currently lives and has her gallery in Santo Tomás, Atlántico, Colombia. She is also currently working on an artwork titled Rosalogico which depicts the human existence as a unique phenomenon inside the beauty that art can only create.

== Education ==
Rosa Navarro studied at La Normal de Fátima and went on to study at El Instituto Ariano in Barranquilla where she developed her artist portfolio. In 1977, she joined the faculty of the Architecture department and, in 1978, she went on to study plastic arts at La Facultad de Bellas Artes, Universidad del Atlántico, Barranquilla.

== Artwork ==
=== R-O-S-A Lenguaje de los Sordomudos, 1981 ===
In 1981 a few professors like Antonio Iginio Caro, Alvaro Herazo and Ida Esbra incentivized Rosa to create her first photography artwork titled R-O-S-A, inspired by body parts as language and the color pink. Letras "R", "O", "S", A", is a reference to her name is sign language. Navarro spells ROSA in sign language with each of the photograph as one letter and colored in pink. This piece inspired her to create other ones like “Huellas en Rosa” and “Una Rosa es una Rosa”. In addition, she created a piece titled "La Amorosa, La Furiosa, La Misteriosa". She was part of a museum exhibition at the Arte Moderno de Medellín museum, "II Salón Arturo y Rebeca Rabinovich", in 1982.

She became interested in the nature of flowers in the work of Paul Gauguin and began to work with her name Rosa, which is also a flower. In her photography she includes herself not because of her name but because of her identity and as a symbol. In certain occasions she also uses the word Rosa and in some she uses the themes and classic metaphors. For example, she used the classic theme of Dafne, who converts into the Laurel tree after Apollo chases her. She uses that theme but also converts herself throughout her art. She converts into a rose from a rose bush.

In 1984, she was invited to showcase her work at the "IX Salón Atenas" del Museo de Arte Moderno en Bogotá. Afterwards to showcase at the salón “Nominados” de la fundación Gilberto Alzate Avendaño. In 1986, she received her first invitation to participate in the XXX Salón Nacional de artistas en Bogotá. Later she participates at the ediciones XXXII, XXXIV, XXXV. Since that period she has been part of several exhibitions where she showcases her work: “Rosa de los Vientos”, “Juego de Palabras”, “Romana”, “Rosa Patriótica-Rosa Ecológica”, “Recogiendo Espacio” and “Rosa Rosae”. She has gained excellent publicity and art criticisms which have exposed her internationally. Some of her artwork has been exhibited in France several occasions, they include: “Un Revé Rose pour une Rose” en el CDI santa Melanine Chantepie (2001), “Mire salle des Fertes de la Chatoais a Vern” (2002), and “Fantasía de una Rosa Caribe” (2007).

=== Nacer y Morir de una Rosa, 1982 ===
Nacer y Morir de una Rosa (Birth and Death of a Rose) is a black and white series of seven photographs. The artwork depicts the artist's face, and two large black roses covering her eyes. In the first photographs the roses begin as small buds, eventually growing into large roses and die.

== List of artworks ==
- 1981: R-O-S-A Lenguaje de los Sordomudos (in order: R-O-S-A), gelatin silver photograph illuminated with water-based marker, 20.5 x 11 cm each one
- 1982: Un Rosa es una Rosa, color film photograph, 20 x 25 cm
- 1982: Nacer y Morir de una Rosa, black and white photograph, 26 x 20.5 cm
- 1982: Huellas en Rosa, gelatin silver photograph, 19.5 x 25.5 cm
- 1982: Rosa Rosae, Doble exposure photograph, 48 x 58 cm
- 1983: R-O-S-A, black and white inverted film photograph, 60 x 50 cm
- 1984: Juego de Palabras Amorosa, inverted film photograph, 50 x 60 cm
- 1984: Juego de Palabras Misteriosa, inverted film photograph, 50 x 60 cm
- 1984: Juego de Palabras Furiosa, inverted film photograph, 50 x 60 cm
- 1984: Juego de Palabras Dolorosa, inverted film photograph, 50 x 60 cm
- 1984: Espinas de Rosa, black and white photograph, 38 x 48 cm
- 1985: Romana, color film photograph, 12 x 18.8 cm, original work: 1m x 1m, 2m x 1m
- 1986: Sin Titulo, inverted film photograph, 50x60cm
- 1986: Rostros para una ceremonia, canvas and inverted film photograph
- 1989: Recogiendo Espacio, inverted film photograph, 20 x 25 cm
- 1989: Rosa de los Vientos, film photograph, 19 x 13.3 cm, original work: 60 x 50 cm
- 1992: Rosa Patriotica, Rosa Ecologica, photography, painting and mixed media, 160 x 105 cm

== Solo exhibitions ==
- 1984: Rosa Navarro, Galería Quintero, Barranquilla.
- 1986: Retratos para una Ceremonia, Galería Círculo, Santafé de Bogotá.
- 2007: "Fantasía de una Rosa Caribe", La MIR, La Maison Internacionale de Rennes, France
- 2012: "El Autoretrato... Una Visión Contemporánea", Biblioteca Luis Eduardo Nieto Arteta, Barranquilla

== Collective exhibitions ==
- 1980: Estudio "Colectiva", Galería La Escuela, Universidad del Atlántico
- 1980: Taller III, Galeria La Escuela, Universidad del Atlántico
- 1982: Segundo Salon Rabinovich, Museo de Arte Moderno, Medellín
- 1982: Primer Salón Colombo Americano, Galería Lincoln, Barranquilla
- 1983: El Cuerpo Como Lenguaje, Museo de Arte Moderno, Cartagena
- 1984: IX Salón Atenas, Museo de Arte Moderno, Bogotá
- 1987: Intergraf 87, Berlín. 10 Artistas Costeñas, Centro Colombo Americano, Barranquilla
- 1984: Rosa Navarro, Galeria Quintero, Barranquilla
- 1986: Retratos para una ceremonia, Galeria Circulo, Bogotá
- 1989: XXXII Salón Nacional de Artistas, Cartagena
- 1992: V Salón Regional de Artistas, Comfamiliar Atlántico, Barranquilla
- XXXIV Salón Nacional de Artistas, Corferias, Santafé de Bogotá
- 1993: VI Salón Regional de Artistas, Comfamiliar Atlántico, Barranquilla
- 1994: XXXV Salón Nacional de Artistas. Corferias, Santafé de Bogotá
- 2001: "Un Revé Rose pour une Rose", CDI Santa Melanie Chantepie, France
- 2001: "Caribe Soy", IUFM de Bretagne Rennes, France
- 2002: "Mire Salle des Fertes de la Chatoais a Vern, France
- 2003: "Bibliotecarte I" Biblioteca Pública Julio Hoenisgsberg
- 2004: "Pequeño Formato", Comfamiliar Atlántico, Barranquilla
- 2005: "Historia de Fotografia en Colombia 1950-200", Museo Nacional, Bogotá
- 2006: "Bibliotecarte IV", Biblioteca Pública Julio Hoenisgsberg
- 2007: "Fotografía Verdad y Stimulación", Museo Nacional de Colombia
- 2007: "Campo Santo", Lago de Maracay Estado de Aragua, Venezuela
- 2007: "In Memoriam", Galería La Escuela, Universidad de Barranquilla
- 2007: "Somos Todos", Museo del Atlántico
- 2008: "Las Carraozas... Obras de Arte", Casa Del Carnaval, Barranquilla
- 2009: "Arte Sacro", Casa de la Cultura, Sabanalarga, Atlántico
- 2010: "Introitus", Centro de Formación de la Cooperación Española de Cartagena
- 2013: "Mujeres Costeñas en el Arte", Bohemia Centro de Arte, Barranquilla
- 2015: "7 Decada de Vanguardia II", Galería de Arte La Escuela, Universidad del Atlántico
- 2015: Site Decadas de vanguardia II, Universidad del Atlántico, Barranquilla, Colombia
- 2016: "El Valor de Las Emociones", Comfamiliar Atlántico, Barranquilla
- 2017: "Radical Women of Latin American Art", Hammer Museum, Los Angeles
- 2018: "Radical Women of Latin American Art", Brooklyn Museum, New York City
- 2018: "El Arte de la Desobediencia", Museo de ARTE Moderno de Bogotá (MAMBO), Colombia 2018 "Radical Women of Latin American Art", Pinacoteca São Paulo 2018 "Dimensión Desconocida. Otros Relatos del Caribe, Salón Regional del Caribe Colombiano

== Awards and honors ==
- 1982: Mention, II Salón Rabinovich, Museo de Arte Moderno, Medellín. Second Place, I Salón Colombo Americano, Barranquilla
- 1983: Second Prize, IV Muestra de Medios de Expresión Plástica, Universidad Autónoma, Barranquilla
- 1982: ARTURO Y REBECA RABINOVI, Museo de Arte Moderno de Medellín
- 1982: PRIMER SALON COLOMBO AMERICANO Galería Lincoln, Barranquilla

== Distinctions ==
- Los Recursos de la Imaginación: Artistas Visuales del Caribe Colombiano Primera y segunda Edición Eduardo Márceles Daconte 2010
- Historia de la Fotografía en Colombia 1950 – 2000 Eduardo Serrano
- Museo Nacional de Colombia Editorial Planeta
- Museo de Arte Moderno de Bogotá MAMBO LA COLECCIÓN Junio 2016
- Radical Women: Latin American Art 1960 -1985 HAMMER MUSEUM Ángeles California Septiembre 2017. She was selected to represent Colombia for this exhibition.

== Bibliography ==
- Alvarado Suescun Toledo. "Una Mirada Crítica Al VIII Salón Regional", El Heraldo, 10 August 1997, pp. 6–
- "El Salón Atenas." El Heraldo-- Revista Dominical (Barranquilla), 15 April 1984
- Gilberto Marenco Better. “El Arte Conceptual Sigue Dando Palo.” Intermedio--Supplemento Del Diario Del Caribe, 31 October 1982, pp. 12–13.
- Jenny Tamayo Montaya. “Barranquilleras Nominadas En Salón de Arte Actual.” Gente Diario Del Caribe, 11 April 1984.
- ———. Los Salones Atenas en la colección del Museo de Arte Moderno de Bogotá. Bogotá: Museo de Arte Moderno, 2003.
- Sandra Patricia, and Bautista Santos. !!Hey chicas¡ ¿Dónde están? Poéticas de acción y reacción del género femenino en el arte Colombiano desde 1980. Enredars Publicaciones.
- Serrano, Eduardo. Historia de la fotografía en Colombia: 1950–2000. Bogotá: Planeta, 2006.
- Valencia, Luis Fernando. "Consideraciones sobre la pedagogía del arte." Revista del arte y la arquitectura en América Latina (Medellín) 2, no. 8 (1982): 31–35.
