= Alicia Barney =

Colombian artist based in Cali (born 1952)

- Born: November 28, 1952 (age 73); Cali, Colombia
- Education: College of New Rochelle, New York (BA 1974), Pratt Institute, Brooklyn (MFA 1977)

Alicia Barney (born November 28, 1952) is a Colombian artist based in Cali who focuses her paintings and installation art on ecological questions and problems such as water pollution, deforestation and quality of life. She specializes in on-hand interactions with her surroundings and what the natural environment has to offer in order to educate the public about her environmental concerns. Barney's artwork reveals the evolution of her view of ecological aspects through landscape themes that hold traditional and representational vocabulary and express ecology in a creative and interesting way.

== Biography ==
Barney was born in Cali, Colombia, in 1952. Barney studied at the College of New Rochelle, New York (BA 1974), and at the Pratt Institute, Brooklyn (MFA 1977) where she came across the art of Claes Oldenburg. Oldenburg inspired Barney to create her first ever sculpture. She created, Diario objecto I and Diario object II (Object diary I, 1977, and Object diary II, 1978-79) to show how everyday objects can create art and a storyline with simple random objects found in her primary homes, New York and Colombia. Barney is a powerful influence on young Latin American artists, especially Colombians, who have an interest in environmental issues. She is currently resident in Bogotá.

== Artworks ==
- Reproductions: "Viviendas" (1975)
- Puente sobre tierra (1975)
- Los Estados que Compre (1976), Wood, metal, postcards and leather, 30 x 37 x 3 cm
- Tiempo de quema (1976), Wood, metal, paper and leather, 30 x 90 x 13 cm
- Diario objeto I and Diario objeto II (Object diary I, 1977, and Object diary II, 1978-79), Found objects, 16 x 70 x 23/4 in. (40.6 x 177.8 x 7 cm) The Diario Object (Diary Objects) is an art installation of found objects that Barney collected on the streets of New York and Colombia. She collected urban waste and everyday objects. The items she collected were used in a diary format that eventually became a small fragment of her autobiography. The items she collected were placed in plastic bags and then displayed, pinned up on a wall.
- Boca Grande (1978-1979)
- Estratificaciones de un basurero utópico (1981), Installation of ten acrylic tubes with organic residues, sand, stones, vegetal charcoal and soil., 180 x 5 cm
- Reproductions: "Rio Cauca" (1982), Installation;- Three clear acrylic tanks, test tubes, water, photographic record (35 photographs) and 5 water drums.
- Mis paticas inmortalizadas (1984)
- La Requisa (1998), Installation;- three cast aluminum triangles, 140 rustic copper semi-spheres, and ten dental acrylic corncobs with human molars, Variable dimensions.

== Exhibitions ==
=== Past exhibitions ===
- 2018 Radical Women Latin American Art, Brooklyn Museum of Art, 1960-1985
- 2017 Live Uncertainty: An Exhibition after the 32nd Bienal de São Paulo, Serralves Museum of Contemporary Art
- 2017 La forma del futuro Exposición + laboratorio de experiencias, La Tertulia Museum
- 32nd Bienal de São Paulo (2016)

=== Solo exhibitions ===
- 1978 Diario-objeto, Biblioteca Central, Universidad del Valle, Cali, Colombia
- 1982 El ecologico, Espacio Alternativo Sara Modiano, Barranquilla, Colombia
- 1993 Aves en el cielo, Galeria Gartner Torres, Bogota
- 1998 Jugete de las hadas, Museo de Arte de Pereira and Museo La Merced de Cali, Colombia
- 2015 Basurero utopica, Instituto de Vision, Bogota

== Honors and awards ==
In 1980 Barney was awarded first place at the third Salon Regional de Artes Visuals in Colombia, and her work has been featured in important group shows, such as the 32nd Bienal de São Paulo (2016).

== Bibliography ==
- "Entrevista: Conversacion con Alicia Barney Caldas." Errata#: Revista de artes visuales 10 (January 2014): 234-45
- Gonzalez, Miguel. "Alicia Barney." In Entrevistas: Arte y cultura de Latinoamerica y Colombia, 57-64. Cali, Colombia: Secretaria de Cultura y Turismo de Santiago de Cali, 2003.
- ______. "Alicia Barney: El paisaje alternativo: Aferrada al drama que la naturaleza provoca." Arte en Colombia 19 (October 1982): 40-43.
- ______. "Alicia Barney: Entre la realidad del arte y la de la vida." Contraste: Revista de el pueblo, no. 117 (February 6, 1983): 8-10.
- Villa, Catalina. "La artista Alicia Barney, pionera del arte ecologico, regresa con su obra a Cali." El Pais, September 6, 2015.
