= Villarrica, Tolima =

Coordinates: 4°00′N 74°35′W

- Municipality and town
- Flag Coat of arms

- Location of the municipality and town of Villarrica, Tolima in the Tolima Department of Colombia.
- Country: Colombia
- Department: Tolima Department

Government
  - mayor: Arley Beltrán Díaz

Area
  - Total: 460 km^{2} (180 sq mi)
- Elevation: 860 m (2,820 ft)

Population (2015)
  - Total: 5,449
- Time zone: UTC-5 (Colombia Standard Time)

Villarrica is a town and municipality in the Tolima Department of Colombia. The population of the municipality was 5,903 as of the 1993 census. Most workers work in agriculture or cattle ranching. The altitude is 863 meters above sea level.

The Villarrica region was inhabited in pre-Columbian times by the Cuindes and Cundayes. Villarrica was hidden behind the Andes mountain range and a thick forest, and the indigenous population was to a great extent undisturbed until 1920, when Don Francisco Pineda López founded an estate called Villarica. The municipality is named after this estate.

== Climate ==
Climate data for Villarrica (Luis Bustamante), elevation 1,610 m (5,280 ft), (1971–2000)
Month	Jan	Feb	Mar	Apr	May	Jun	Jul	Aug	Sep	Oct	Nov	Dec	Year
Mean daily maximum °C (°F)	22.7 (72.9)	22.8 (73.0)	23.1 (73.6)	22.7 (72.9)	22.9 (73.2)	22.7 (72.9)	22.8 (73.0)	23.2 (73.8)	23.0 (73.4)	22.3 (72.1)	22.1 (71.8)	22.1 (71.8)	22.7 (72.9)
Daily mean °C (°F)	18.9 (66.0)	19.0 (66.2)	19.3 (66.7)	19.1 (66.4)	19.1 (66.4)	18.9 (66.0)	18.9 (66.0)	19.2 (66.6)	19.1 (66.4)	18.6 (65.5)	18.6 (65.5)	18.5 (65.3)	18.9 (66.0)
Mean daily minimum °C (°F)	15.4 (59.7)	15.8 (60.4)	16.2 (61.2)	16.2 (61.2)	16.1 (61.0)	15.8 (60.4)	15.5 (59.9)	15.8 (60.4)	15.7 (60.3)	15.6 (60.1)	15.7 (60.3)	15.5 (59.9)	15.8 (60.4)
Average precipitation mm (inches)	128.9 (5.07)	154.8 (6.09)	228.8 (9.01)	231.9 (9.13)	197.5 (7.78)	112.5 (4.43)	91.9 (3.62)	85.3 (3.36)	121.0 (4.76)	248.3 (9.78)	234.9 (9.25)	158.9 (6.26)	1,994.7 (78.53)
Average precipitation days	16	16	21	23	24	20	21	19	18	24	24	16	242
Average relative humidity (%)	81	81	81	83	83	82	79	77	79	83	85	84	82
Mean monthly sunshine hours	86.8	73.5	71.3	72.0	83.7	93.0	102.3	96.1	84.0	68.2	69.0	77.5	977.4
Mean daily sunshine hours	2.8	2.6	2.3	2.4	2.7	3.1	3.3	3.1	2.8	2.2	2.3	2.5	2.7
Source: Instituto de Hidrologia Meteorologia y Estudios Ambientales
