= Colombian Battalion =

- Batallón Colombia (Spanish)
- Active: 1951–1954
- Country: Colombia
- Allegiance: United Nations
- Branch: Colombian National Army; Colombian National Navy
- Size: 5,100 soldiers; 300 sailors
- Engagements: Korean War; Operation Thunderbolt; Battle of Old Baldy; Operation Nomad-Polar; Battle of Triangle Hill; Battle of Pork Chop Hill

The Colombian Battalion was an infantry battalion of the Colombian Army that served under United Nations Command during the Korean War from 1951 to 1954. The first Colombian military unit to serve in Asia, the battalion was attached to the U.S. 7th Infantry Division and 25th Infantry Divisions.

== Background ==
The election of President Laureano Gómez in 1950 sparked renewed interest in building up Colombia–United States relations. Gómez wanted greater U.S. economic support in exchange for direct involvement as an ally, and a means to erase any lingering impressions caused among U.S. policymakers of his previous attitude of anti–U.S. and pro–German sentiment during the World Wars.

Gómez emphasized the importance of the United Nations security charter and the concept of collective security. As such, he pushed the military to form an expeditionary force that could be deployed on behalf of the United Nations. The overall strength of the battalion was between 4,314 or 5,100 infantry soldiers and 300 sailors on board the frigates ARC Almirante Padilla, ARC Capitán Tono, and ARC Almirante Brión.

The battalion was the only South American army to join the Korean War; the United States wanted Mexico, Argentina, and Brazil to collaborate and contribute a regiment, but they all declined to fight except for Colombia. Most of the equipment in the battalion consisted of World War II American weapons such as the M2 carbine and 1911.

== Korean War ==
Following the outbreak of the Korean War, the Colombian Battalion was deployed to Busan on 15 June 1951 under the command of Colonel Jaime Polanía Puyo. The battalion participated in Operation Thunderbolt, the Battle of Old Baldy, the Battle of Triangle Hill and the recapture of Kumsong through Operation Nomad-Polar.

The Battle of Old Baldy was particularly notable for the battalion, as the unit lost (killed or wounded) 20% of its deployed strength in the engagement.

=== Casualties ===
The Colombian Battalion suffered men 163 killed in action, 448 wounded, 60 missing, and 30 captured over the course of the conflict.

== Commanders ==
- Alberto Ruiz Novoa
- Jaime Polanía Puyo

== See also ==
- United Nations Forces in the Korean War
- Medical support in the Korean War

== Gallery ==
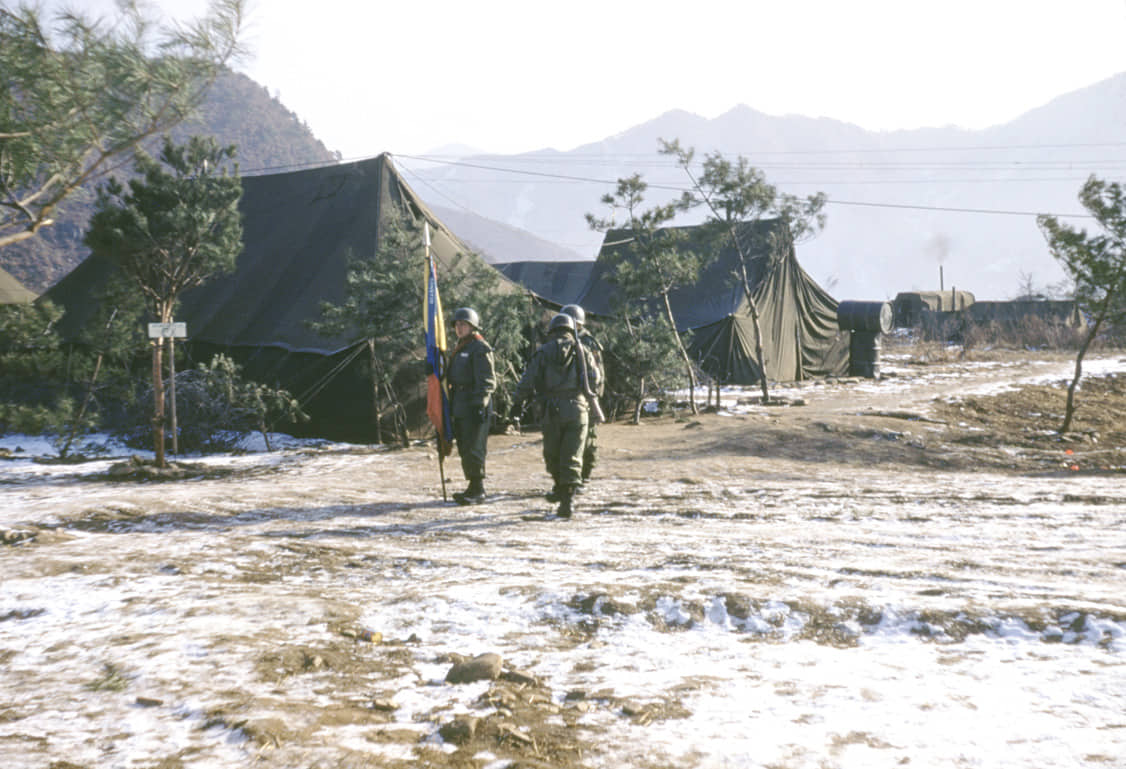

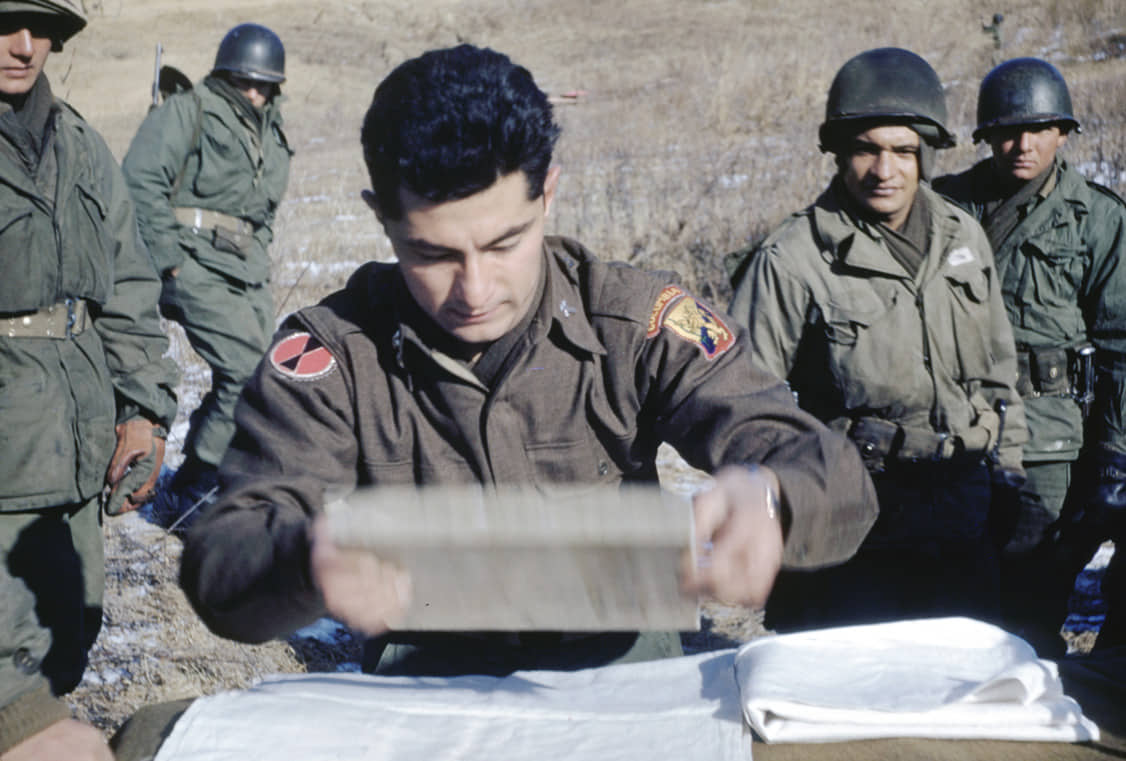

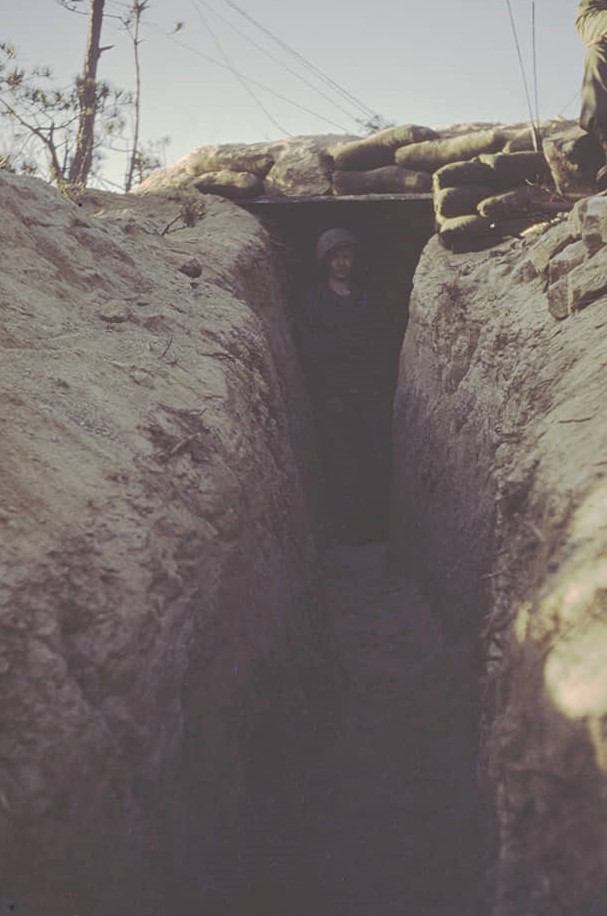

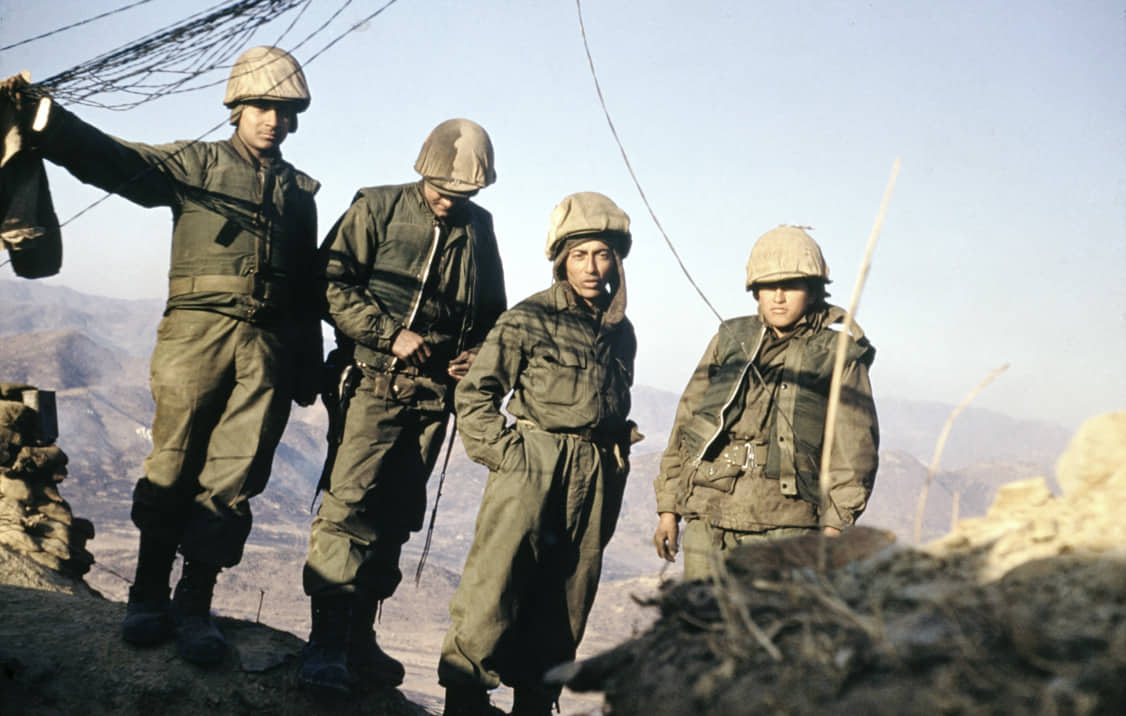

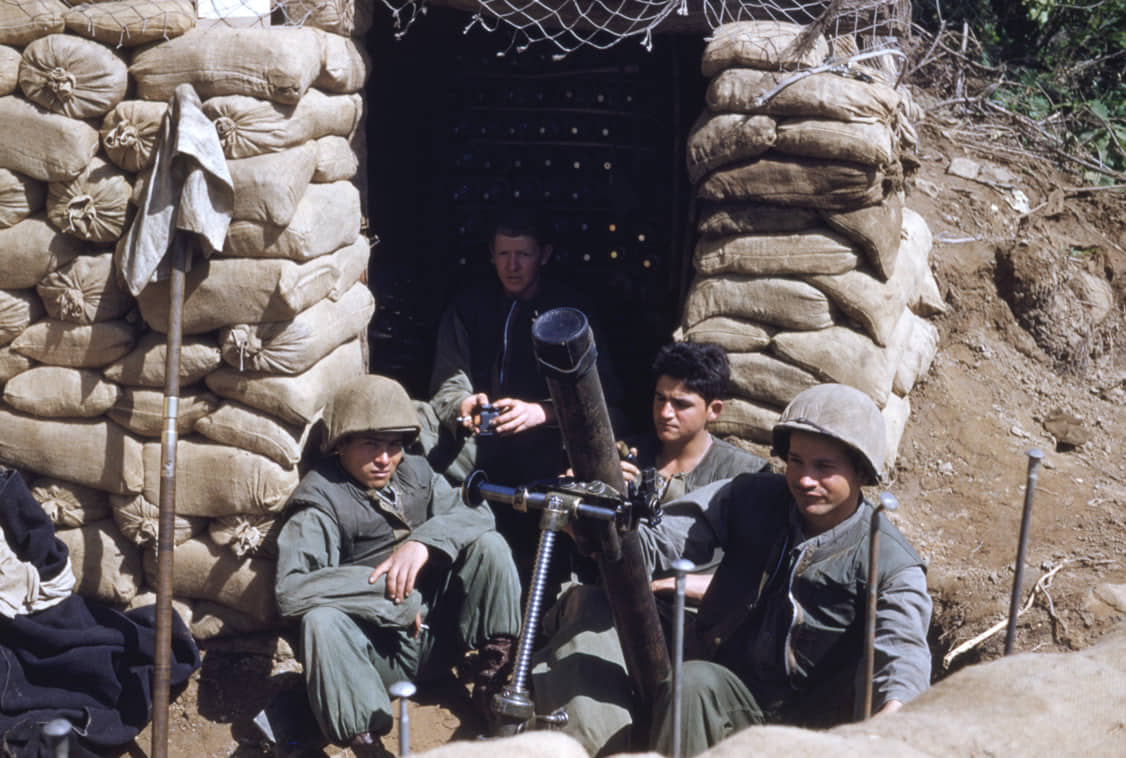

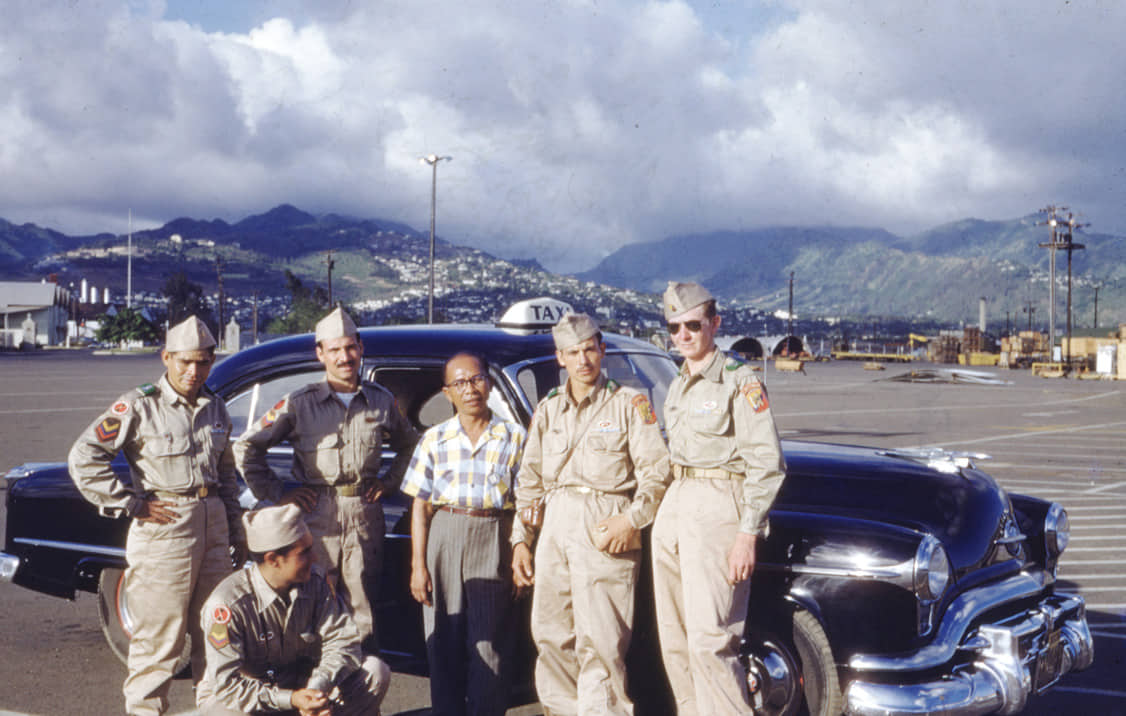
Colombians in Hawaii

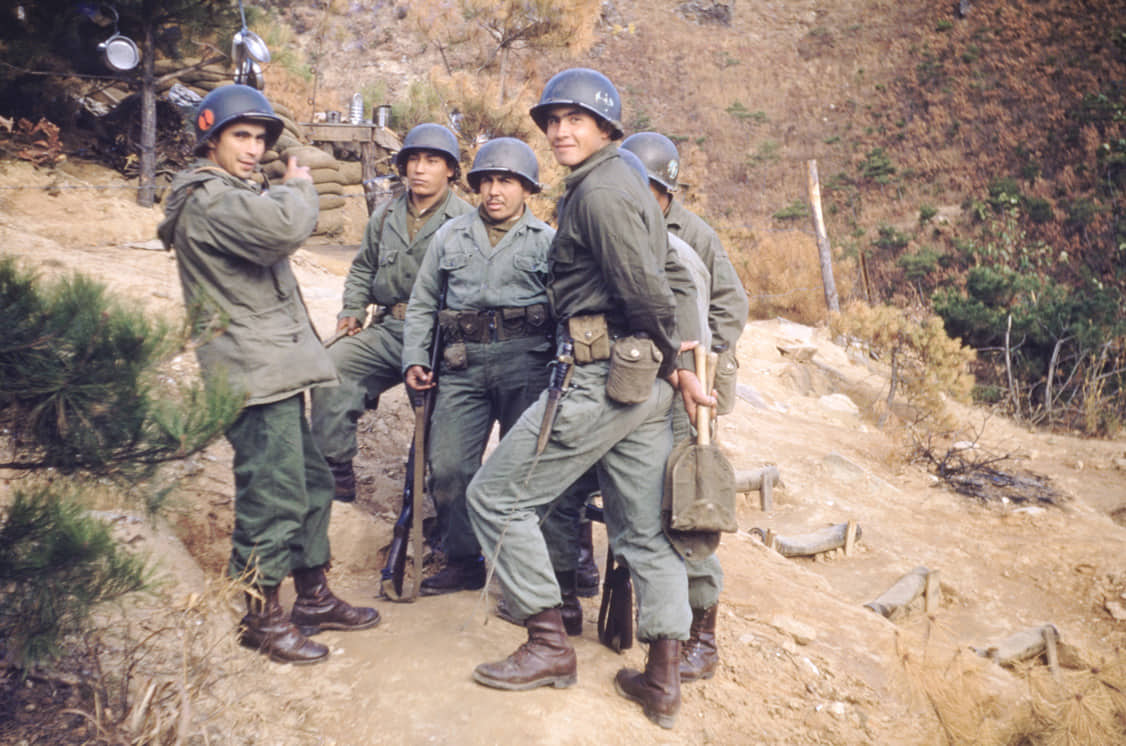

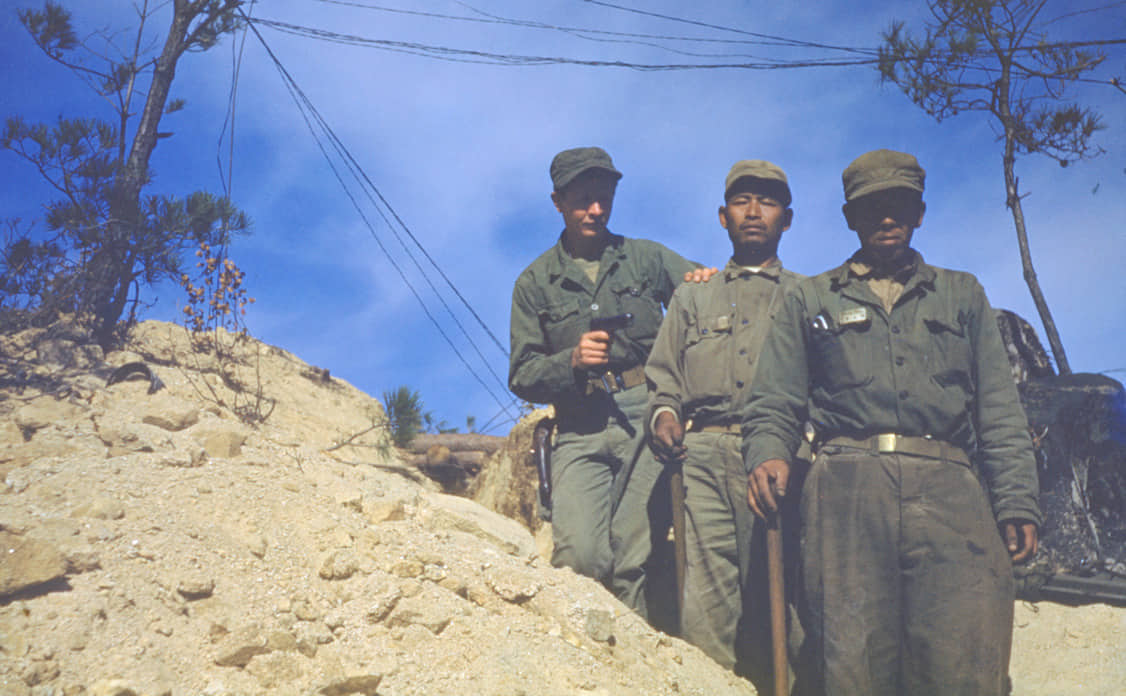
Colombian soldiers with a Chinese prisoner

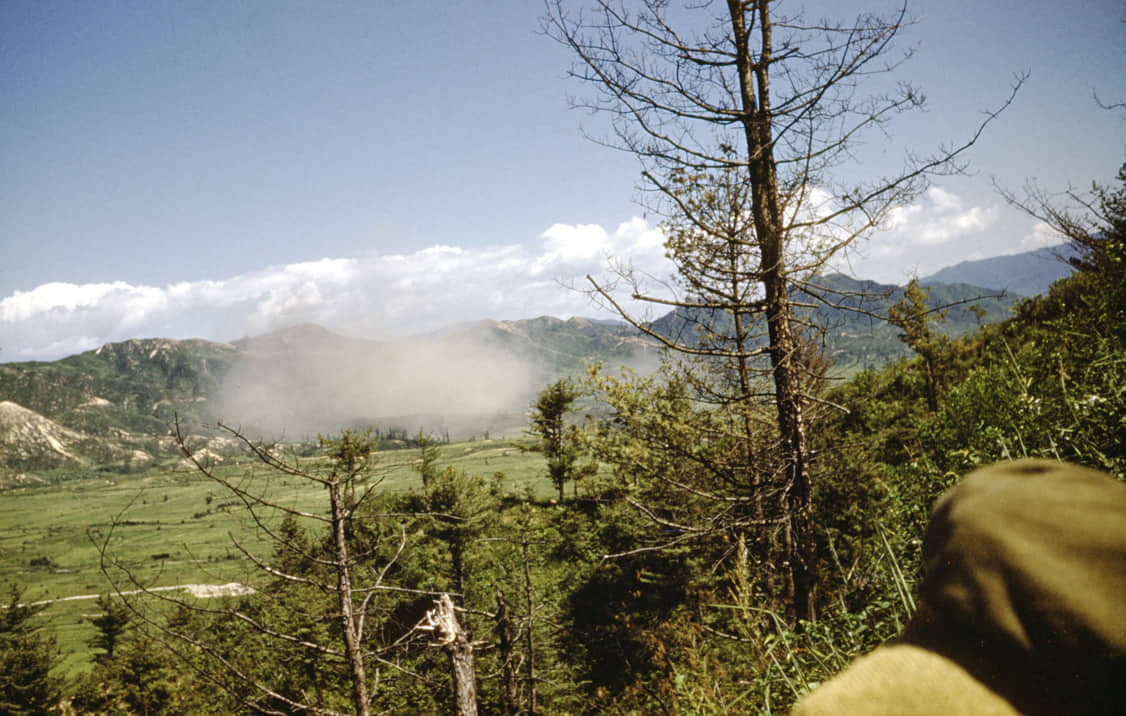
bombardment by Colombian soldiers

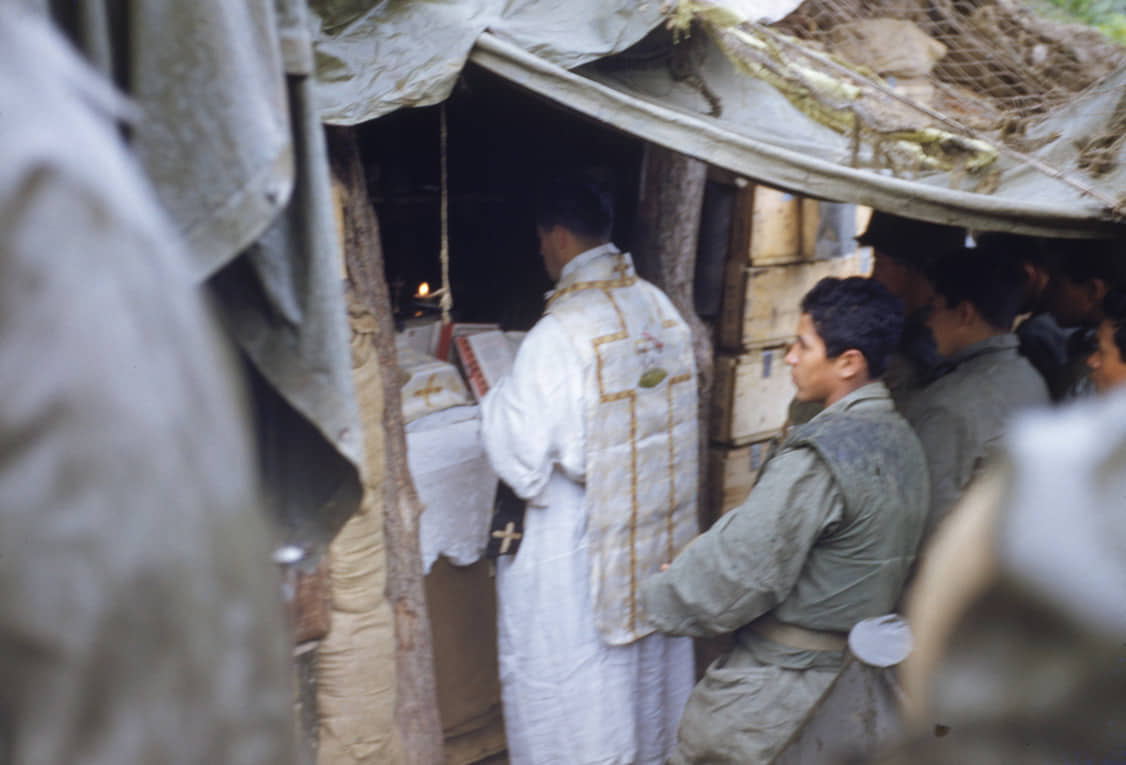
chaplain along with battalion soldiers

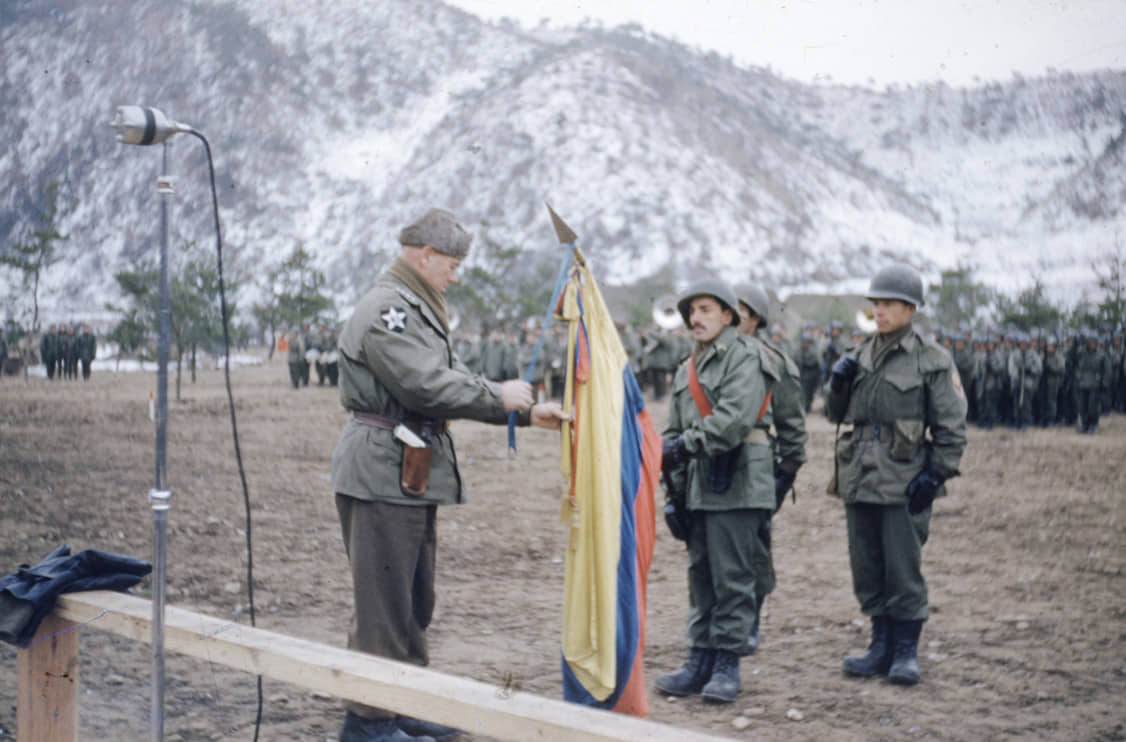

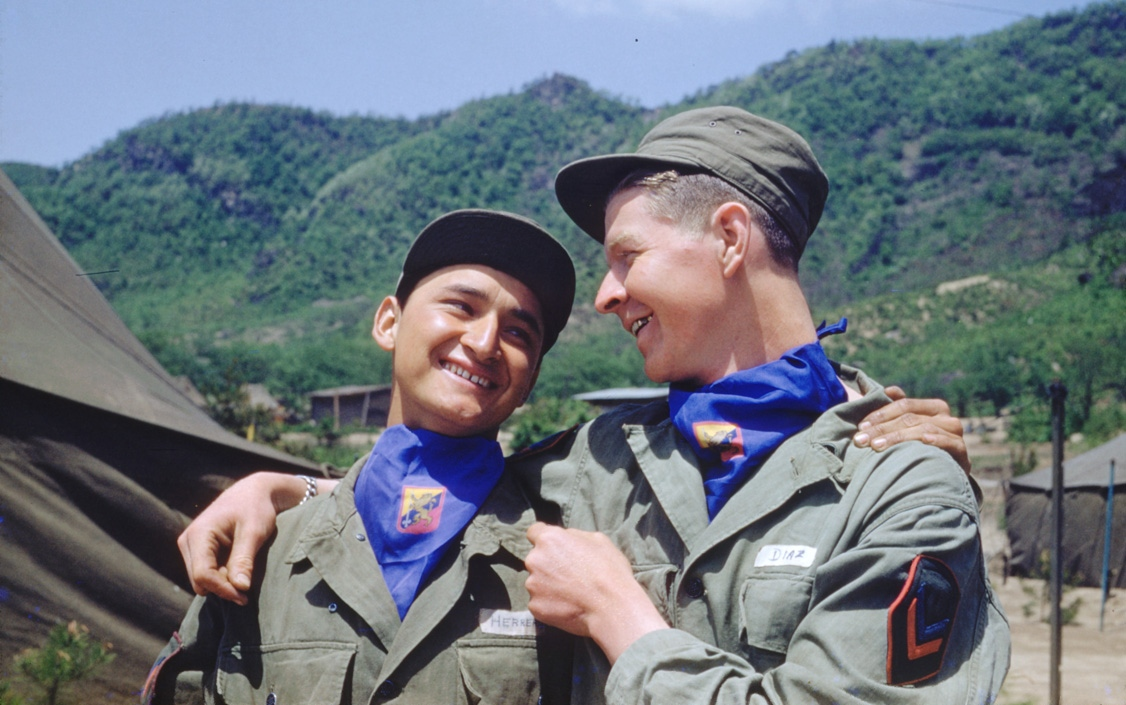

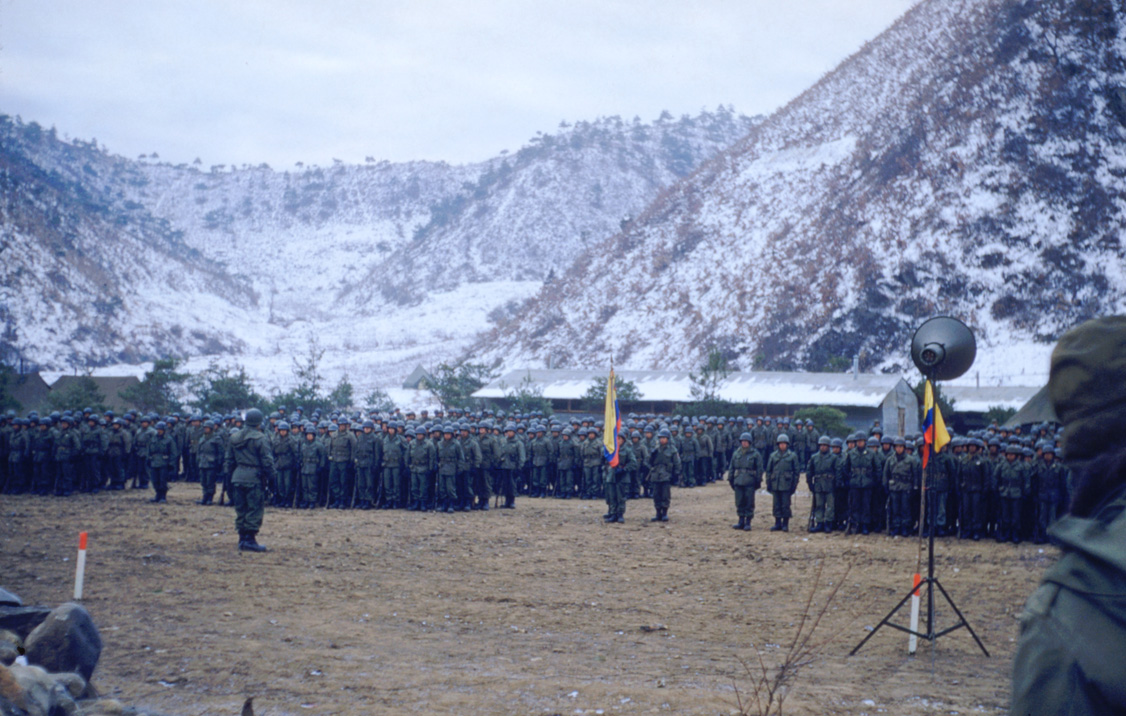

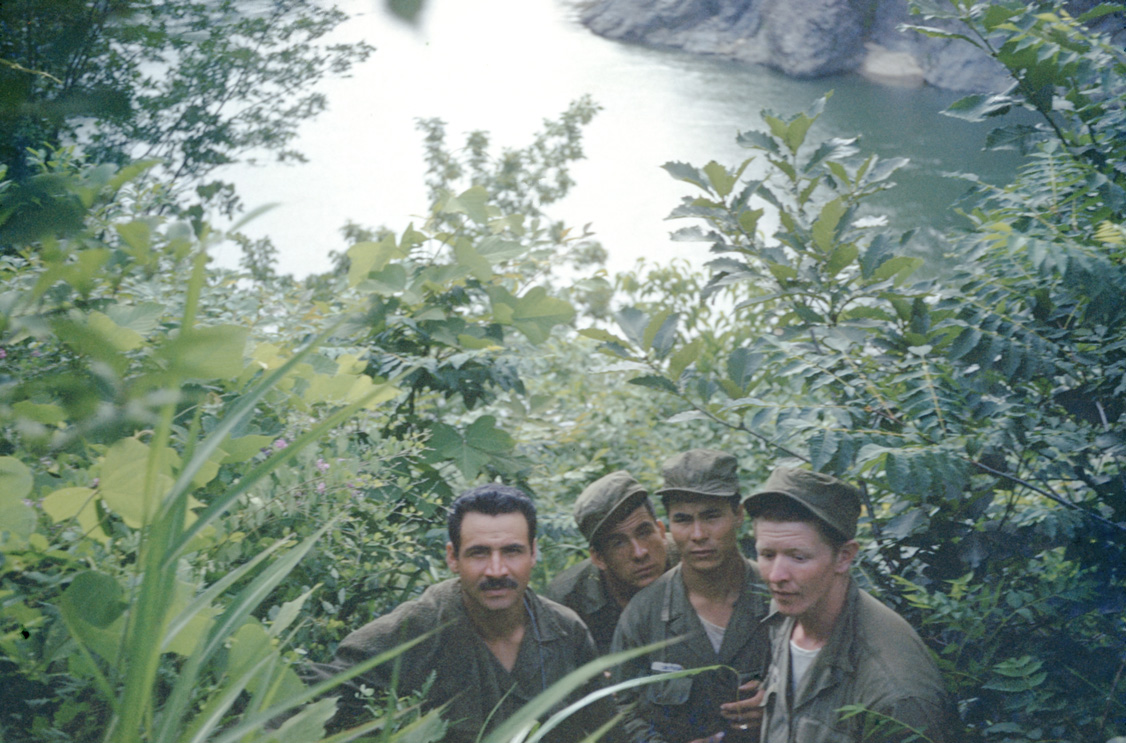
soldiers in training

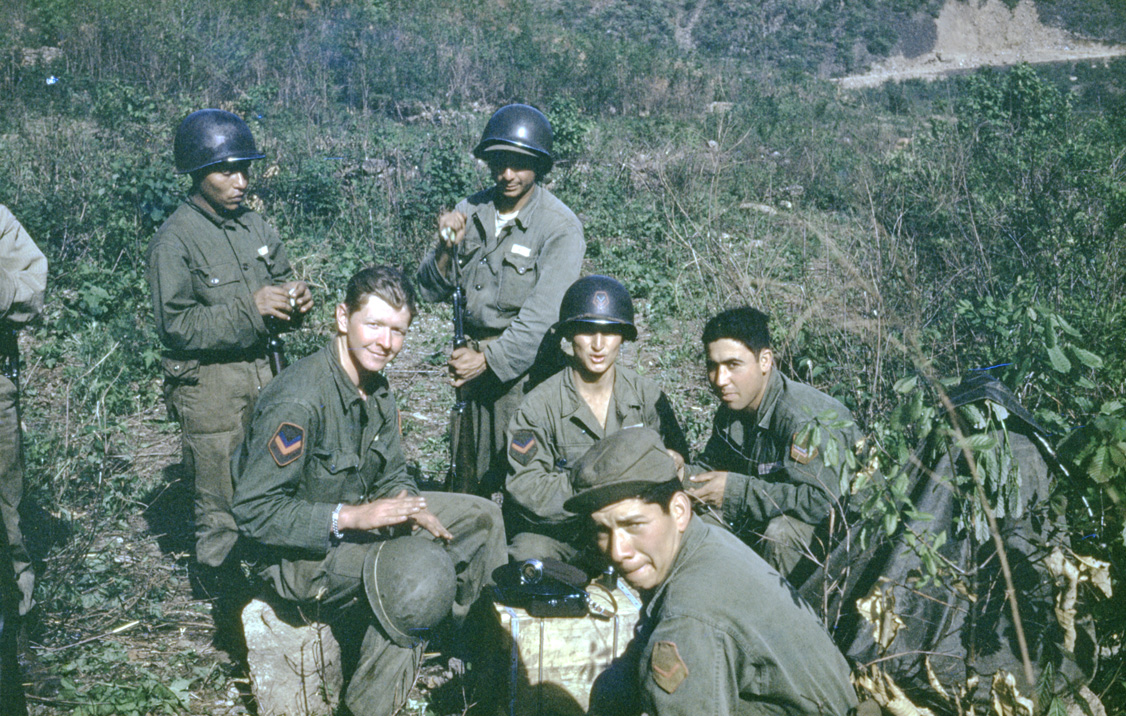
soldiers in training
