= 1953 Colombian parliamentary election =

Parliamentary elections were held in Colombia on 15 March 1953 to elect the Chamber of Representatives. The Liberal Party and the Communist Party both boycotted the elections, and as a result, the seats reserved for the minority party were left vacant. The Conservative Party won the remainder.

== Results ==
Party	Votes	%	Seats	+/–
Colombian Conservative Party	1,025,409	100.00	76	+5
Vacant			56	–
Total	1,025,409	100.00	132	0
Valid votes	1,025,409	99.72		
Invalid/blank votes	2,914	0.28		
Total votes	1,028,323	100.00		
Source: Nohlen
