= 1951 Colombian parliamentary election =

Parliamentary elections were held in Colombia on 16 September 1951 to elect the Senate and Chamber of Representatives. Although the Liberal Party boycotted the elections, some Liberals from the Populares faction did stand. As a result of the boycott, the seats reserved for the minority party were left vacant, whilst the Conservative Party won the remainder.

== Results ==
=== Senate ===
Party	Votes	%	Seats	+/–
Colombian Conservative Party	922,607	98.99	40	+11
Colombian Liberal Party	5,586	0.60	0	–34
Colombian Communist Party	3,856	0.41	0	0
Vacant			22	–
Total	932,049	100.00	62	–1
Valid votes	932,049	99.67		
Invalid/blank votes	3,089	0.33		
Total votes	935,138	100.00		
Source: Nohlen

=== Chamber of Representatives ===
Party	Votes	%	Seats	+/–
Colombian Conservative Party	921,370	98.92	71	+8
Colombian Liberal Party	5,681	0.61	0	–69
Colombian Communist Party	4,418	0.47	0	0
Vacant			61	–
Total	931,469	100.00	132	0
Valid votes	931,469	99.67		
Invalid/blank votes	3,111	0.33		
Total votes	934,580	100.00		
Source: Nohlen
