= Martha Lucía Zamora =

Colombian lawyer and politician

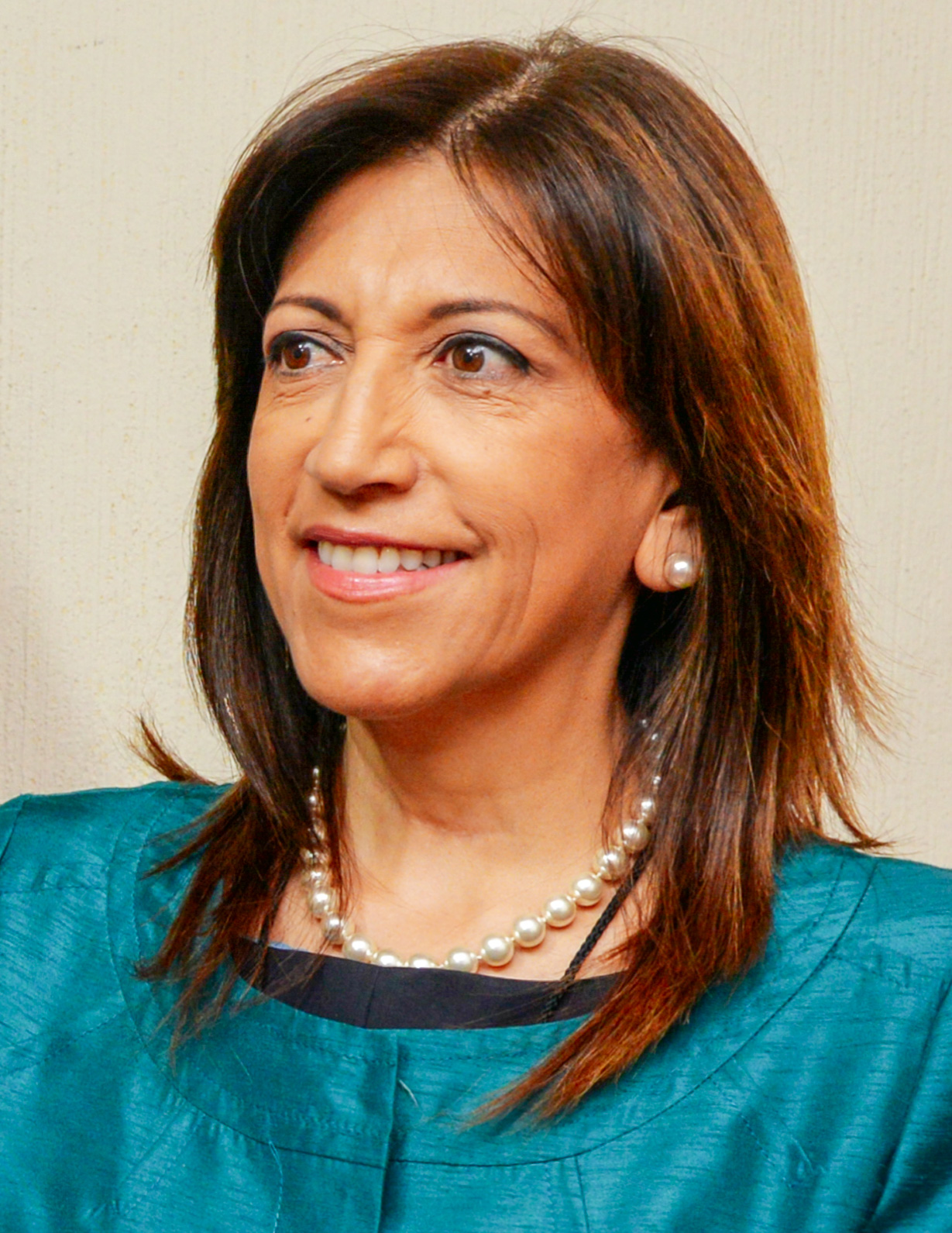

Chief of the antenna of CICIG in Txela International Commission Against Impunity in Guatemala
- In office 27 October 2016 – June/July 2017
- President: Jimmy Morales
- Succeeded by: Flor de María Gálvez

Acting Attorney General of Colombia
- Acting; 5 March 2012 – 29 March 2012
- Preceded by: Viviane Morales
- Succeeded by: Luis Eduardo Montealegre

7th Deputy Attorney General of Colombia
- In office 2 April 2011 – 5 March 2012
- Appointed by: Viviane Morales
- Preceded by: Guillermo Mendoza
- Succeeded by: Jorge Fernando Perdomo

Personal details
- Born: Martha Lucía Zamora Ávila; 11 March 1960 (age 66) Zipaquirá, Cundinamarca, Colombia
- Education: Universidad Externado de Colombia
- Occupation: Lawyer, politician

Martha Lucía Zamora Ávila (born 11 March 1960) is a Colombian lawyer and politician. She served as Attorney General of Colombia from 5 to 29 March 2012, after the resignation of Viviane Morales.

== Professional career ==
Born in Zipaquirá, Martha Lucía Zamora graduated from the Universidad Externado, and worked as a professor at Sergio Arboleda and Saint Thomas Aquinas universities before beginning a long career in the Judiciary of Colombia. She began as secretary of the Justice Commission of the National Constituent Assembly in 1991, a position that allowed her to learn the details of the nascent Prosecutor's Office, the Constitutional Court, the Superior Council of Judicature, and other institutions created by the Constitution of 1991.

A year later, Judge Alejandro Martínez Caballero took her as an assistant magistrate to the Constitutional Court, and there she was the promoter of several guardianship decisions, such as the sentence that eliminated the chepitos (debt collectors), and the first action that ordered a school to readmit a pregnant girl. Likewise, she was the manager of a key decision that determined the minimum conditions of imprisonment for the mentally ill.

She then joined the Prosecutor's Office during Gustavo de Greiff's administration, becoming the first female attorney delegated to the Supreme Court. She held the same position during the tenures of prosecutors Alfonso Valdivieso and Alfonso Gómez Méndez. This led to her being involved in delicate processes that aroused controversy at the time.

In 2001 she resigned from his position in the Prosecutor's Office. That same year, she was appointed by the Attorney General Edgardo Maya Villazón as Delegate Attorney before the Supreme Court. She held this position until 2009, when Maya Villazón was replaced as Attorney General by Alejandro Ordóñez.

Subsequently, Zamora was an assistant magistrate of the Criminal Chamber of the Supreme Court, where she worked alongside Judge Iván Velásquez, recognized for his investigations into the parapolitics scandal.

In January 2012, she was appointed by Viviane Morales as an advisor to the Attorney General's Office. On 5 March, with the resignation of Deputy Attorney Alejandro Martínez, Morales appointed Zamora as Deputy Attorney General. That same day, the Supreme Court accepted the resignation of Morales, and Martha Lucía Zamora took office as the acting Attorney General until the Court elected the new prosecutor.

On 22 March 2012, the Supreme Court elected Luis Eduardo Montealegre as Inspector General. He took office on 29 March, and Zamora became a new delegated prosecutor before the Supreme Court.

On 31 May 2012, prosecutor Zamora took on the investigation of the young University of Los Andes students Laura Moreno and Jessy Quintero, involved in the Colmenares case, after Antonio Luis González was removed by order of Attorney General Montealegre. On 2 October 2012, she also took on the investigation of student Carlos Cárdenas for his alleged participation and knowledge in the events surrounding the strange death of Luis Andrés Colemares.

On 22 April 2014, Attorney General Montealegre accepted Zamora's resignation as head of the delegated unit before the Court. After leaving the investigating body, she was appointed secretary general of Bogotá by mayor Gustavo Petro.

On 28 January 2016, she was elected magistrate of the Administrative Chamber of the Superior Council of Judicature. She worked as a legal researcher of the International Commission Against Impunity in Guatemala (CICIG), one of the Justice Support Institutions of the United Nations, and served as its chief from October 2016 to July 2017. On 1 November 2017, she became head of the legal department of the executive secretariat of the Special Jurisdiction for Peace.
