= Attorney General of Colombia =

Colombian government official

Attorney General of the Nation
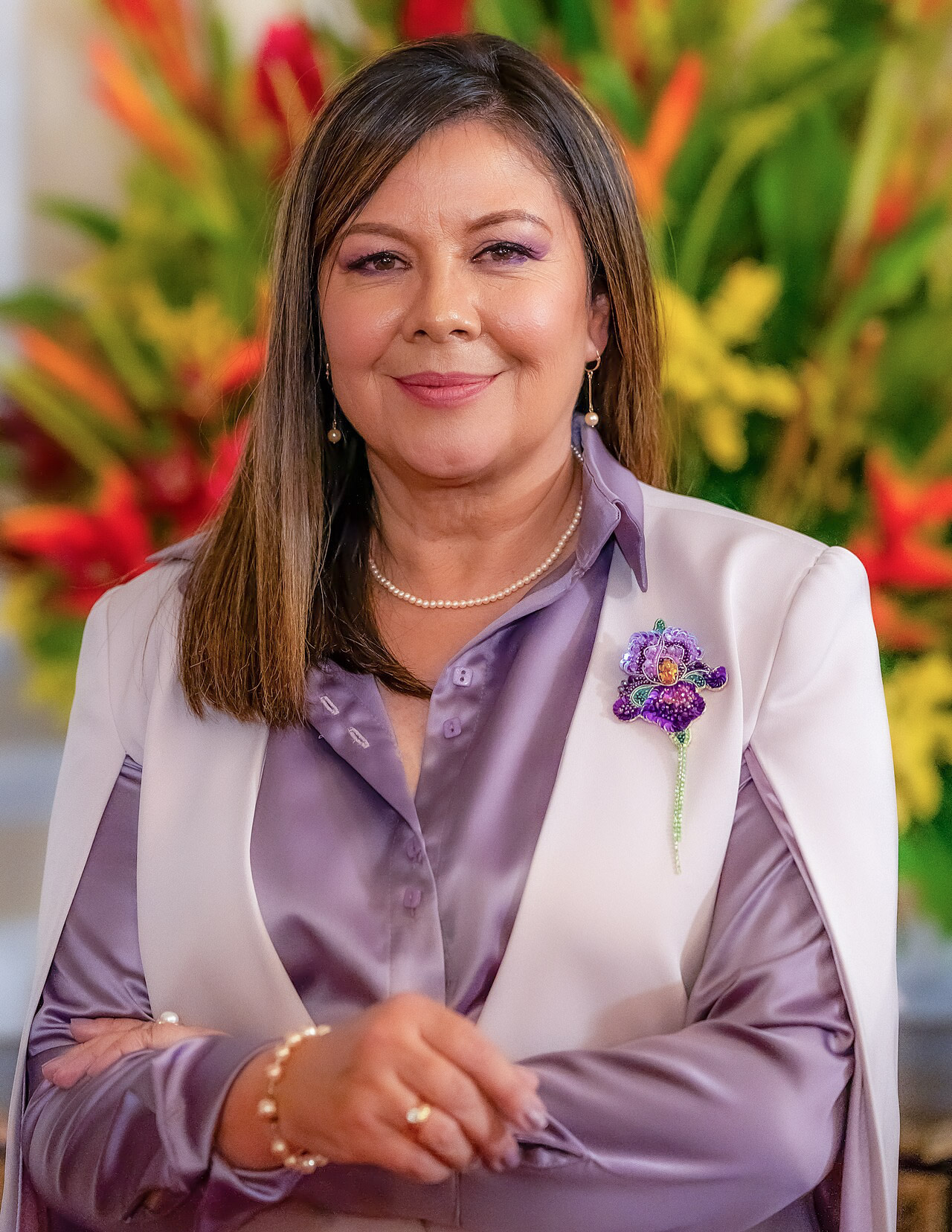
- Incumbent; Luz Adriana Camargo since March 22, 2024
- Office of the Attorney General
- Style: Mrs. Attorney General (informal); The Honorable (formal)
- Member of: Judicial Branch
- Seat: Bogotá, D.C.
- Appointer: Supreme Court of Justice
- Term length: Four years, non renewable
- Formation: August 2, 1992
- First holder: Gustavo de Greiff
- Deputy: Deputy Attorney General
- Website: www.fiscalia.gov.co

The Attorney General of Colombia (Attorney General of the Nation) is the head of the Attorney General's Office of the Nation of Colombia and the principal law enforcement official. The attorney general acts as the main head of criminal prosecution in all legal matters, with administrative and budgetary autonomy. The attorney general is a member of the Judicial Branch.

The attorney general is elected by the Supreme Court of Justice from a list of three nominees selected by the president, and serves for four years, with no possibility of re-election.

Luz Adriana Camargo has been the attorney general of Colombia since March 22, 2024.

== Election process ==
The attorney general is elected by Constitutional Court out of a ternary presented by the president for a period of four years. To cast the final vote, the Supreme Court of Justice must meet a quorum of 16 out of the possible 23 votes, i.e. two thirds of the votes.

== List ==
| No. | Portrait | Name | Prior experience | State of residence | Took office | Left office | Deputy Attorney(s) |
|---|---|---|---|---|---|---|---|
| 1 | | Gustavo de Greiff | Lawyer, 115th Rector of the Rosary University | Bogotá, D.C. | April 1, 1992 | August 17, 1994 | Carlos Arrieta |
| 2 | | Alfonso Valdivieso | Lawyer, Minister of National Education | Santander | August 18, 1994 | May 8, 1997 | None |
| 3 | | Alfonso Gómez Méndez | Lawyer, Inspector General | Tolima | July 3, 1997 | July 3, 2001 | None |
| 4 | | Luis Camilo Osorio | Lawyer, National Civil Registrar | Antioquia | August 1, 2001 | July 31, 2005 | Jorge Armando Otálora |
| 5 | | Mario Iguarán | Lawyer, Deputy Minister of the Justice | Bogotá, D.C. | August 1, 2005 | July 31, 2009 | Guillermo Mendoza (Note: as acting attorney general from August 1, 2008 to January 11, 2011.) |
| 6 | | Viviane Morales | Lawyer, Senator of Colombia | Bogotá, D.C. | January 3, 2011 | March 5, 2012 | Juan Carlos Forero |
| 6 | | Viviane Morales | Lawyer, Senator of Colombia | Bogotá, D.C. | January 3, 2011 | March 5, 2012 | Wilson Alejandro Martínez |
| 6 | | Viviane Morales | Lawyer, Senator of Colombia | Bogotá, D.C. | January 3, 2011 | March 5, 2012 | Martha Lucía Zamora (Note: as acting attorney general from March 6, 2012 to March 29, 2012.) |
| 7 | | Luis Eduardo Montealegre | Lawyer, Magistrat of the Constitutional Court | Tolima | March 29, 2012 | March 28, 2016 | Jorge Fernando Perdomo (Note: as acting attorney general from March 29, 2016 to July 31, 2016.) |
| 8 | | Néstor Humberto Martínez | Lawyer, Minister of the Interior | Bogotá, D.C. | August 1, 2016 | May 21, 2019 | María Paulina Riveros |
| 9 | | Francisco Barbosa | Lawyer, President of the Ibero-American Association of Public Prosecutors | Bogotá, D.C. | February 13, 2020 | February 12, 2024 | Martha Janeth Macera (Note: as acting attorney general from February 13, 2024 to March 12, 2024.) |
| 10 | | Luz Adriana Camargo | Lawyer, Head of Investigation and Litigation of the International Commission against Impunity in Guatemala | Bogotá, D.C. | March 12, 2024 | Incumbent | Gilberto Guerrero |

== See also ==
- Judicial Branch of Colombia

== Notes ==
Order of precedence
| Preceded by Álvaro González as Counselor for National Reconciliation | Order of precedence of Colombia as Attorney General | Succeeded by Major General Helder Giraldo as General Commander of the Military Forces |
