= Jorge Fernando Perdomo =

Colombian lawyer (born 1975)

Jorge Fernando Torres
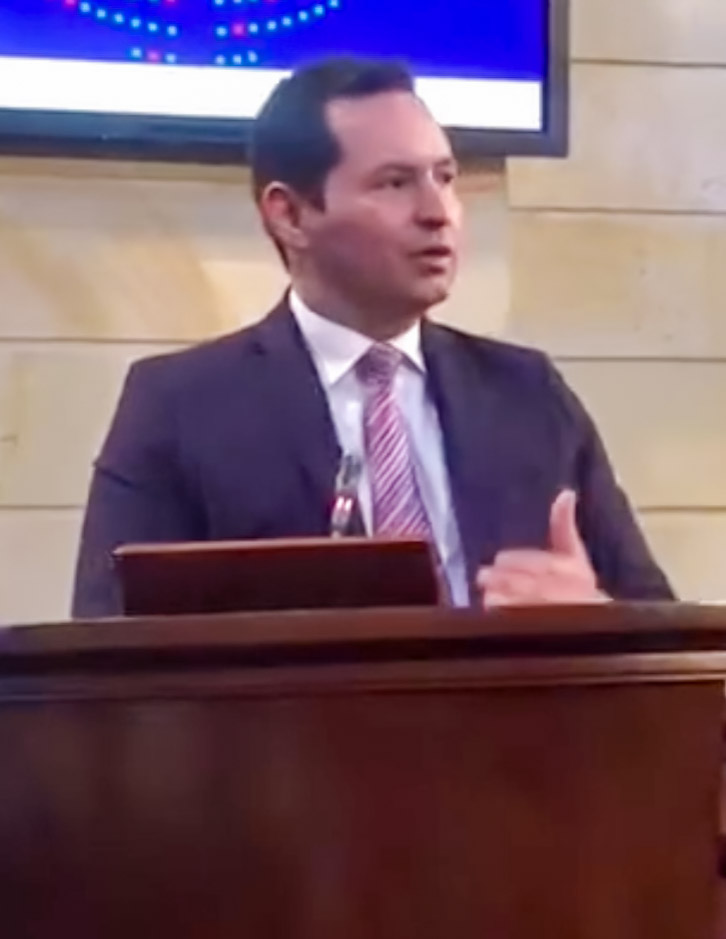
- Perdomo c. 2016.

Acting Attorney General of Colombia
- Acting; March 29, 2016 – July 31, 2016
- Preceded by: Luis Eduardo Montealegre
- Succeeded by: Néstor Humberto Martínez

8th Deputy Attorney General of Colombia
- In office June 2, 2012 – March 26, 2016
- Appointed by: Luis Eduardo Montealegre
- Preceded by: Martha Lucía Zamora
- Succeeded by: María Paulina Riveros

Deputy Minister of Criminal Policy and Restorative Justice
- In office April 6, 2011 – June 2, 2012
- President: Juan Manuel Santos
- Preceded by: Miguel Samper
- Succeeded by: Olga Claros

Personal details
- Born: Jorge Fernando Perdomo Torres; February 19, 1975 (age 51) Gigante, Huila, Colombia
- Party: Independent (2012–present)
- Other political affiliations: Liberal (2002–2012)
- Education: Universidad Externado de Colombia (LLB); University of Bonn; University of Seville
- Profession: Lawyer; Jurist; Writer

Jorge Fernando Perdomo Torres (born February 19, 1975) is a Colombian lawyer who served as Deputy Minister of Criminal Policy and Restorative Justice from 2011 to 2012 under Minister Juan Carlos Esguerra, Deputy Attorney General of Colombia from 2012 to 2016 and as Acting Attorney General of Colombia from June to August 2016, appointed by the Constitutional Court during the election process of a new Attorney General.

Born in Gigante, Huila, he earned a law degree from the Externado University of Colombia and later a master's and doctorate in law from the University of Bonn. He later completed a postdoctoral fellowship in Victimology at the University of Seville.

Political offices
Preceded by Miguel Samper	Deputy Minister of Criminal Policy and Restorative Justice; 2011–2012	Succeeded by Olga Claros
Legal offices
Preceded by Martha Lucía Zamora	Deputy Attorney General of Colombia; 2012–2016	Succeeded by María Paulina Riveros
Preceded by Viviane Morales	Acting Attorney General of Colombia; 2016	Succeeded by Néstor Humberto Martínez
