= Death of Luis Andres Colmenares =

2010 suspicious death in Bogotá

Luis Andrés Colmenares Escobar (born May 23, 1990, in Villanueva (La Guajira), Colombia - October 31, 2010 in Bogotá D.C., Colombia) was an economics and industrial engineering major student at Los Andes University in Bogotá D.C., Colombia, who was found dead under suspicious circumstances on October 31, 2010, after going to a Halloween party at a club in the popular "Zona Rosa". Initial investigations explained Luis Andres' death as a result of an accident, but almost a year later prosecutors found evidence to start a murder investigation. Ten months after Luis' death, the investigation was re-opened and suspects were named in the case. The prosecutor in this case was removed in a controversial decision by Colombia's Attorney General in May 2012 after constant complaints by counselor for the defense. In June 2012, Carlos Cárdenas was charged with Luis Colmenares' murder and detained.

== Facts ==
On October 30, 2010, Luis Andrés went to a Halloween costume party at a night club in the popular Zona Rosa in Bogotá with his date, Laura Moreno, as well as Jessy Quintero, and several other friends and classmates.

According to Moreno and Quintero, they left the party around 3:15 a.m. local time on October 31, 2010. Luis was allegedly very anxious and he went out and walked away. Jessy and Laura said they followed him and that Luis claimed he was hungry, so the three of them went to eat while the rest of the group got Laura's SUV from the parking lot. Moreno and Quintero later told law enforcement that, after buying a hot dog, all of a sudden and without any explanation, Colmenares started to run "like crazy" towards El Virrey park, which was about 10 minutes walking distance from the hot dog stand. Jessy allegedly stayed at the hot dog stand waiting for her friends while Laura followed Luis. According to Laura, after she tried to stop him several times, Luis jumped into a drain located at El Virrey park. Jessy said that she was picked up by a group of friends, called Luis Andres' cell phone and Laura answered the call. She explained that Laura was frantic and told her that Luis jumped into the water channel (which was less than 50 cm deep) and that she was unable to see him anymore.

Supposedly, the group of friends met Laura at the park and started looking for Luis. After a couple of hours of not finding him, they sought police assistance at a station nearby. They also alerted Luis' family and a formal search began.

Oneida Escobar, Luis Andrés’ mother, went to the park to look for her son at 6 a.m. after Laura and Jessy called Luis' brother. She initially started looking in hospitals and police stations. In the meantime, the police and firemen were conducting an exhaustive search around the area without any results. Around 6 p.m. on October 31, 2010, Oneida Escobar begged the firemen and police officer to look again under the drift where, according to Moreno, Colmenares jumped. After finding nothing, the firemen retired. Another call was received around 9 p.m. and when the firemen returned to search again, they found the dead body of Colmenares about 400 feet away from where Moreno said Luis had jumped. The body was taken to the Colombian National Legal Medicine Institute for further evaluation. The result of the first autopsy, showed Colmenares had a grade 3 of alcohol intoxication, which would have strongly impaired him, and confirmed the accidental death hypothesis. Under this theory, the case was closed.

However, the Colmenares family never accepted that theory. According to the autopsy performed at Instituto Nacional de Medicina Legal y Ciencias Forenses, by Leslie del Pilar Rodríguez, Luis Colmenares suffered a violent death. A second autopsy by Máximo Duque, former director of the same Institute, hired by the Colmenares family and research done by Prosecutor Antonio González concluded that the body had eight wounds, none compatible with a fall. However, the murder theory was disproved during court proceedings, and even the prosecutor was found to be involved in a false witnesses’ plot to inculpate Colmenares' classmates.

== Trial ==
In October 2011, Laura Moreno and Jessy Quintero were arrested, accused of perjury and covering a crime. According to the prosecutors' office there is "strong evidence" that allow them to infer that these two young women participated in the murder of Luis Andrés Colmenares.

On May 31, 2012, Antonio González, main prosecutor, was removed from the case by Eduardo Montealegre, General Attorney, after frequent clashes with Jaime Granados, defense attorney of Laura Moreno, and substituted by Martha Lucía Zamora. González stated he had full confidence in Zamora's abilities to win the case, that he was proud of delivering a case already in trial while it was almost closed when he received and said he will keep silence about some aspects of the trial because of ethics.

On June 6, 2012, the prosecution stated that a witness of the events, Wilmer Ayola, came forward, claiming that the night of the events he saw a truck stopping in front of the park where the water channel is located. According to the witness, Luis Colmenares walked away from the truck and Laura Moreno ran after him and slapped Colmenares in the face. Carlos Cárdenas exited the truck and hit Colmenares in the head with a bottle and then Cárdenas and a group of friends kicked the victim while on the ground. After failed efforts by the group to reanimate Colmenares, they carried away the body in the truck. Ayola claimed he came forward because he had been threatened. He also explained that he was afraid because a partner that was with him that night, whom he identified only by the name of Cristian, had disappeared. Ayola added that Cárdenas offered one million pesos (approximately $500) to Cristian in exchange for their silence and that he received part of the money.

The same day Carlos Cárdenas was detained on charges of aggravated homicide. He claimed it was a false accusation and that there were people interested in damaging his reputation and the well being of his family. The prosecutors stated in the trial files that they had intercepted conversations between Cárdenas and Laura Moreno about his family having an "important contact" in the General Attorney's Office so she should keep her calm. The mother of Carlos Cárdenas, María del Pilar Gómez, hired a lawyer, Aidé Acevedo, to press Armando Novoa, Director of the National Prosecution Office, into changing the prosecutor in charge of the case. Both are indicted with obstruction of justice. The prosecution intercepted cell phone calls between both women talking about the best way to change the course of the case.

On June 14, 2012, Daniel Teleki, attorney for Jessy Quintero, renounced after claiming he and his family had been threatened on social networks. On June 19, 2012, the prosecutor explained that Cristian, the other witness identified by Wilmer Ayola, had been located and that he was looking for protection from the police. Cristian said he had taken pictures of Moreno's truck taken with his cellphone the night of the events.

The following day, Cárdenas and Morenos' lawyer, Jaime Granados, came forward explaining that Ayola worked as security guard in a building complex far from the site of the events and that records proved he was working there that night. He accused Ayola of perjury. In a radio interview, the following day, Ayola explained that he had escaped his working place and that he signed the records after returning to work at 5 a.m. claiming he had proof of this. That very same day, on June 20, 2012, the former General Attorney of Colombia, Mario Iguarán was hired by Cárdenas family as defense lawyer.

On June 28, 2012, the Attorney General, Eduardo Montealegre stated that the initial prosecutor, Antonio González, expelled from the case after pressure from defense lawyers, and other auxiliary attorneys involved in the case, had to be protected from an assassination attempt detected by the CTI (Technical Investigation Team or Cuerpo Técnico de Investigación) and that his security scheme had been reinforced. The same day, Jaime Granados, defense lawyer for Cárdenas, denounced penally González for hiding blood samples taken from Colmenares body, but offered no explanations about the motives of the attorney. González stated that this was a regular procedure.

=== False Witnesses ===
On October 22, 2013, in an interview with RCN news, Wilmer Ayola confessed he had been paid to provide false testimony in support of the prosecutor's murder theory. According to Ayola, he had been paid by the father of the Luis Andrés Colmenares. He also implicated the former prosecutor, Antonio González, as participant in the complot of multiple false witnesses. "Many people paid for this, friends of González, friends of the Colmenares family. Every witness was on the payroll".

== Ruling ==
On February 20, 2017, the judge ruled Laura Moreno and Jessy Quintero were not guilty. The 258 pages document contains detailed accounts of the cases from both the prosecutor and the defense, including eye-witnesses testimony, expert testimony, cellphone records analysis, as well as the judge's conclusion.

=== Prosecutor's indictment ===
According to the prosecutors:

1. On October 30, 2010, Luis Andrés Colmenares Escobar left his house at around 8:45 p.m., in company of his friends Gonzálo Gómez and Laura Moreno, to go to a Halloween party at the Pent House club in Bogota.
2. At around 2:30 a.m. Luis Andrés left the club with his date, Laura and with another friend, Jessy Quintero, allegedly to eat a hot dog near the intersection of Calle 85 and Carrera 15.
3. Luis disappeared shortly after.
4. Both Laura and Jessy claimed to authorities that Luis had fallen to the water canal near El Virrey park.
5. In the early hours of the morning, firefighters searched for Luis Andrés in said water canal but could not find him. It was Laura who pointed the location where Luis had fallen.
6. Hours later, during the night, a second group of firefighters searched again and this time they found the body of Luis Andrés.
7. In a wiretapped phone call, Laura was heard saying: "I saw it", "Jessy and I are the only witnesses", "Jessy is my witness"
8. The witnesses made a pact of silence.
9. Jessy Quintero hid the truth and backed the fall theory.
10. Laura Moreno is intellectual co-author of the murder by not revealing the location of the victim.
11. Jessy Quintero is charged with false testimony.
12. The body of Luis Andrés Colmenares was found in the Virrey park water canal. The autopsy concluded the cause of death as the sum of trauma to the nervous system, trauma to the skull and drowning. As per the prosecutor, it was a homicide: The skull had multiple fractures consistent with a beating. He was then hidden by his attackers in the water canal where he died.

=== Theories ===
==== Prosecutor's theory ====
Luis Andrés Colmenares was the victim of a beating which caused multiple fractures to his skull, he lost consciousness and died when he was hidden partially underwater by his attackers, inside the tunnel of the Virrey park water canal. Laura Moreno and Jessy Quintero were witnesses to these actions and by omitting this information to first responders, they became accessory to murder.

==== Defense ====
Luis Andrés Colmenares falls accidentally into the water canal near the Virrey park. Laura Moreno was witness to the accident. When first responders come, they are unable to find the body. Luis Colmenares was found hours later drowned under a tunnel of said water canal.
