= Néstor Humberto Martínez =

Colombian lawyer (born 1954)

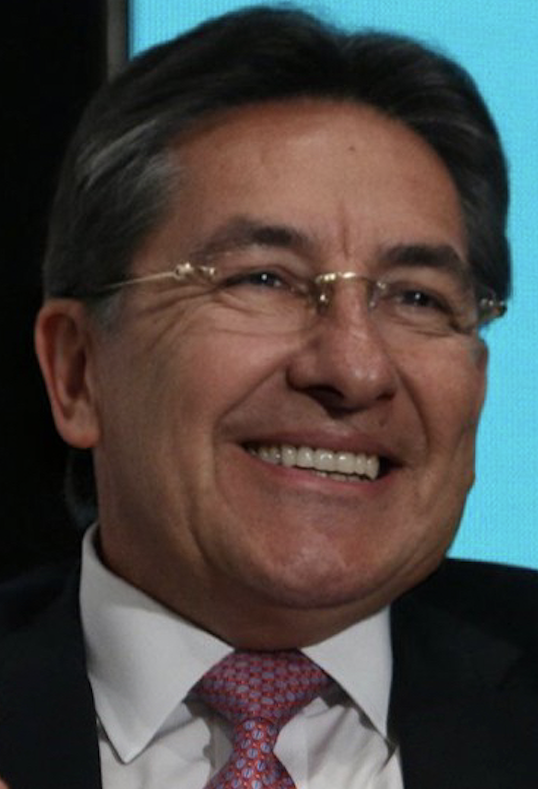
- Martínez in 2023.

8th Attorney General of Colombia
- In office August 1, 2016 – May 15, 2019
- Nominated by: Juan Manuel Santos
- Deputy: María Paulina Riveros
- Preceded by: Luis Eduardo Montealegre
- Succeeded by: Francisco Barbosa

Minister of the Presidency
- In office August 19, 2014 – June 19, 2015
- President: Juan Manuel Santos
- Preceded by: Office established
- Succeeded by: María Lorena Gutiérrez

President of the Radical Change
- In office July 5, 2000 – August 13, 2003
- Preceded by: Position established
- Succeeded by: Germán Varón

Minister of the Interior
- In office August 7, 1998 – August 7, 2000
- President: Andrés Pastrana
- Preceded by: Alfonso López Caballero
- Succeeded by: Armando Estrada Villa

Minister of Justice
- In office August 7, 1994 – August 7, 1996
- President: Ernesto Samper
- Preceded by: Andrés González Díaz
- Succeeded by: Carlos Eduardo Medellín Becerra

Personal details
- Born: Néstor Humberto Martínez Neira; February 8, 1954 (age 72) Bogotá, D.C., Colombia
- Party: Radical Change (1998-present)
- Education: Pontificia Universidad Javeriana (LLB)
- Profession: Lawyer; economist; politician

Néstor Humberto Martínez Neira (born February 8, 1954) is a Colombian lawyer, economist and politician who served as the 8th Attorney General of Colombia from 2016 to 2019. He is one of the founding members of Cambio Radical, previously serving as Minister of the Presidency from 2014 to 2015 under President Juan Manuel Santos and as Minister of Justice from 1998 to 2000.

Born in Bogotá, D.C., Martínez graduated from the Pontificia Universidad Javeriana in Law. In 1998 he went down in history of Colombia as the first Minister to receive a motion of sentencing against him. In 2019, he became the second attorney general to resign from the position since Viviane Morales in 2012.

Political offices
Preceded by Andrés González Díaz	Minister of Justice; 1994-1996	Succeeded by Carlos Eduardo Medellín Becerra
Preceded by Alfonso López Caballero	Minister of the Interior; 1998-2000	Succeeded by Armando Estrada Villa
New office	Minister of the Presidency; 2014-2015	Succeeded by María Lorena Gutiérrez
Party political offices
New office	President of the Radical Change; 2000-2003	Succeeded by Germán Varón
Legal offices
Preceded by Luis Eduardo Montealegre	Attorney General of Colombia; 2016–2019	Succeeded by Francisco Barbosa
