= César Julio Valencia Copete =

Colombian lawyer and magistrate

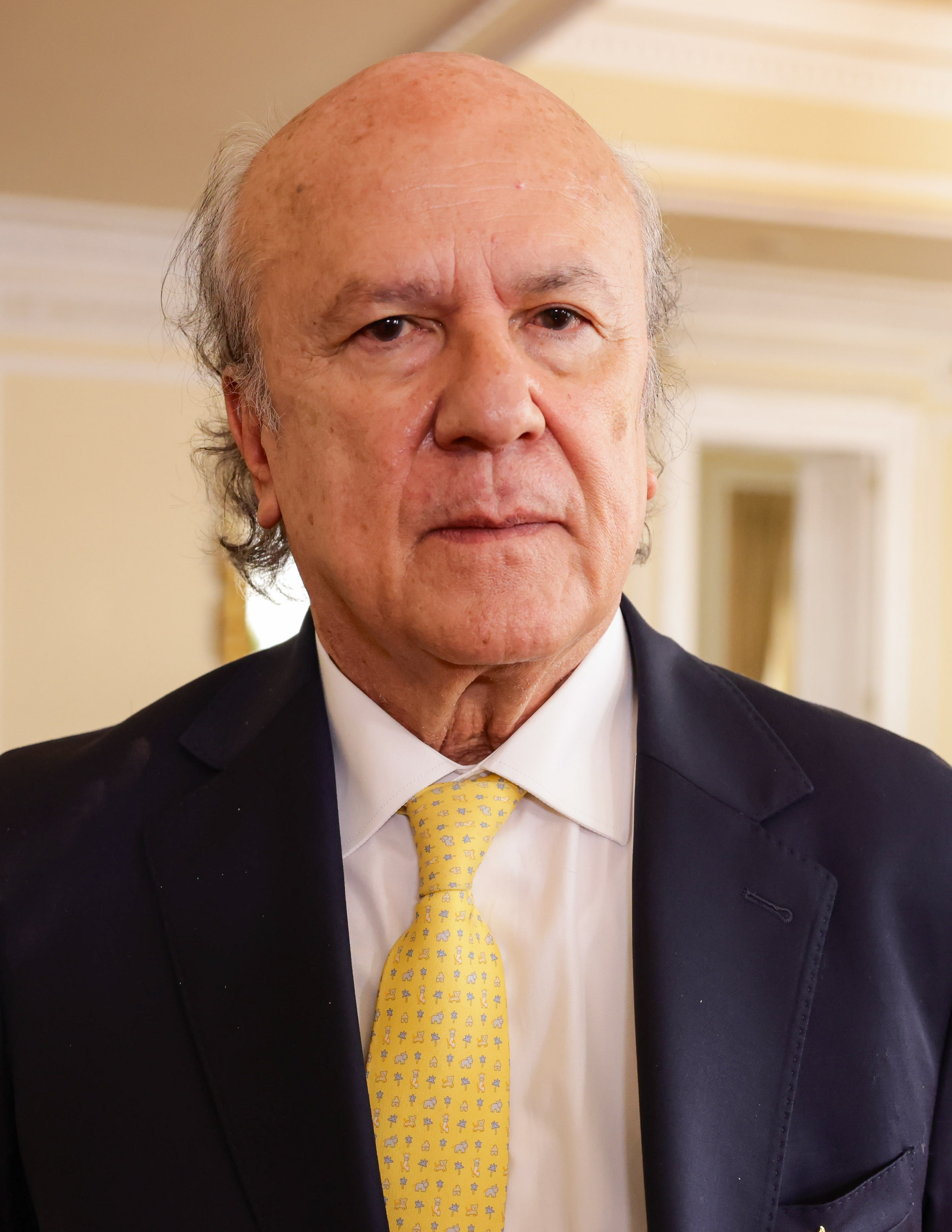
Image of Julio Valencia Copete

César Julio Valencia Copete (born August 24, 1951 in Cali, Valle del Cauca) is a Colombian lawyer and magistrate of the Supreme Court of Colombia. He is the former President of Supreme Court of Colombia.

== Education ==
Valencia graduated from the Universidad Externado de Colombia in Bogotá with a specialization in Commercial law from the same university.
