= Order of precedence in Colombia =

Relative preeminence of officials for ceremonial purposes

The Colombian order of precedence is a symbolic hierarchy of officials used to direct protocol. It is regulated by Act 1444 of 4 May 2011.

== Order of precedence ==
Below is the current cabinet headed by the President of the Republic, in its respective denomination, order and precedence.

1. The President of Colombia (Abelardo de la Espriella) (Note: Spouses of the President, the vice president of Colombia, governors in their own department and mayors in their own cities are afforded the same rank and courtesy that accompanies their spouses' positions at official functions.)
2. The Vice President of Colombia (José Manuel Restrepo) (Note: Spouses of the vice president, governors in their own department and mayors in their own cities are afforded the same rank and courtesy that accompanies their spouses' positions at official functions.)
3. The Cardinal Primate of Colombia (Luis José Rueda)
4. Former presidents of Colombia and their widows/widowers (by seniority of assuming office):
  1. César Gaviria (7 August 1990 - 7 August 1994)
  2. Ernesto Samper (7 August 1994 - 7 August 1998)
  3. Andrés Pastrana (7 August 1998 - 7 August 2002)
  4. Álvaro Uribe (7 August 2002 - 7 August 2010)
  5. Juan Manuel Santos (7 August 2010 - 7 August 2018)
  6. Iván Duque (7 August 2018 - 7 August 2022)
  7. Gustavo Petro (7 August 2022 - 7 August 2026)
5. Former vice presidents of Colombia and their widows/widowers (by seniority of assuming office):
  1. Humberto De la Calle (7 August 1994 - 10 September 1996)
  2. Gustavo Bell (7 August 1998 - 7 August 2002)
  3. Francisco Santos Calderón (7 August 2002 - 7 August 2010)
  4. Angelino Garzón (7 August 2010 - 7 August 2014)
  5. Óscar Naranjo (29 March 2017 - 7 August 2018)
  6. Marta Lucía Ramírez (7 August 2018 - 7 August 2022)
  7. Francia Márquez (7 August 2022 - 7 August 2026)
6. The Minister of Foreign Affairs (Omar Bula) (if there is a diplomat or foreign personalities)
7. The Apostolic Nunciature and Diplomatic
8. Foreign Ambassadors
9. Concurrent Ambassadors
10. The President of the Constitutional Court (Cristina Pardo Schlesinger)
11. The President of Senate (Iván Name)
12. The President of the Supreme Court of Justice (Luis Antonio Hernández)
13. The President of the Council of State (Jaime Enrique Rodríguez)
14. The President of the Chamber of Representatives (Andrés Calle)
15. The President of the Superior Council of Judicature (Aurelio Enrique Rodríguez Guzmán)
16. The President of the National Electoral Council
17. Current Government Ministers (in their respective order of origin)
  1. Minister of the Interior (Rodrigo Lara Restrepo)
  2. Minister of Foreign Affairs (Omar Bula)
  3. Minister of Finance and Public Credit (Miguel Gómez Martínez)
  4. Minister of Justice and Law (Luis Eduardo Montealegre)
  5. Minister of Defense (Pedro Sánchez)
  6. Minister of Agriculture and Rural Development (Martha Carvajalino)
  7. Minister of Health and Social Protection (Guillermo Jaramillo)
  8. Minister of Labour (Antonio Sanguino)
  9. Minister of Mines and Energy (Edwin Palma)
  10. Minister of Commerce (Diana Morales)
  11. Minister of Education (Daniel Rojas Medellín)
  12. Minister of Environment (Lena Estrada)
  13. Minister of Housing, City and Territory (Helga Rivas)
  14. Minister of Information Technologies and Communications (Mauricio Lizcano)
  15. Minister of Transport (María Fernanda Rojas)
  16. Minister of Culture (Yannai Kadamani)
  17. Minister of Sports (Patricia Duque)
  18. Minister of Science, Technology and Innovation (Yesenia Olaya)
  19. Minister of Equality and Equity (Carlos Rosero)
18. The General Director of National Planning (Natalia Molina)
19. The General Director of Social Prosperity (Vacant)
20. The High Commissioner for Peace (Danilo Rueda)
21. The Presidential Advisors
  1. The Counselor for Women's Equality (Clemecia Carabalí)
  2. The Counselor for the Regions (Sandra Ortiz)
  3. The Counselor for Human Rights (Jenny de la Torre)
  4. The Counselor for National Reconciliation (Eva Ferrer)
22. The Attorney General (Luz Adriana Camargo)
23. The Commanders of the Armed Forces (by creation of branch)
  1. General Commander of the Military Forces (Admiral Francisco Cubides)
  2. Commander of the Joint Chiefs of Staff (General Hugo Alejandro López)
  3. Commander of the National Army (General Luis Mauricio Opina)
  4. Commander of the National Navy (Vice admiral Juan Ricardo Rozo)
  5. Commander of the Air Force (General Luis Carlos Córdoba)
  6. Commander of the National Police (General Henry Sanabria)
24. Governors of Departments - when outside their own department (Relative precedence among governors, all of whom are outside their own department, is determined by each department's date of creation or alphabetically by department)
  1. Governor of Amazonas
  2. Governor of Antioquia (Andrés Julián Rendon)
  3. Governor of Arauca (José Facundo Castillo)
  4. Governor of Atlántico (Elsa Noguera)
  5. Governor of Bolívar (Vicente Antonio Blel)
  6. Governor of Boyacá (Ramiro Barragán Adame)
  7. Governor of Caldas (Luis Carlos Velásquez)
  8. Governor of Caquetá (Arnulfo Gasca Trujillo)
  9. Governor of Casanare (Salomón Andrés Sanabria)
  10. Governor of Cauca (Elías Larrahondo Carabalí)
  11. Governor of Cesar (Luis Alberto Monsalvo Gnecco)
  12. Governor of Chocó (Ariel Palacios)
  13. Governor of Córdoba (Erasmo Zuleta)
  14. Governor of Cundinamarca (Nicolás García)
  15. Governor of Guainía (Juan Carlos Iral)
  16. Governor of Guaviare (Heydeer Yovanny Palacio)
  17. Governor of Huila (Luis Enrique Dussán)
  18. Governor of La Guajira (Nemesio Roys Garzón)
  19. Governor of Magdalena (Carlos Caicedo)
  20. Governor of Meta (Juan Guillermo Zuluaga)
  21. Governor of Nariño (Jhon Alexander Rojas)
  22. Governort of North Santander (Silvano Serrano)
  23. Governor of Putumayo (Buanerges Rosero)
  24. Governor of Quindío (Roberto Jaramillo)
  25. Governor of Risaralda (Sigifredo Salazar)
  26. Governor of San Andrés y Providencia (Everth Julio Hawkins)
  27. Governor of Santander (Mauricio Aguilar)
  28. Governor of Sucre (Hector Olimpo)
  29. Governor of Tolima (José Ricardo Orozco)
  30. Governor of Valle del Cauca (Clara Luz Roldán)
  31. Governor of Vaupés (Elícer Pérez)
  32. Governor of Vichada (Álvaro Arley León)
  33. Mayor of the Capital District (Carlos Fernando Galán)
25. The Vice Presidents of the Senate
  1. The First Vice President (Miguel Ángel Pinto)
  2. The Second Vice President (Honorio Henríquez)
26. The Vice Presidents of the Chamber
  1. The First Vice President (Olga Lucía Velásquez)
  2. The Second Vice President (Erika Tatiana Sánchez)
27. The Senators (by alphabetical order)
28. The Members and the Prosecutor of the Supreme Court
29. The Members of the Constitutional Court
