= Deputy Attorney General of Colombia =

Position in the office of the Attorney General of Colombia

Deputy Attorney General of the Nation
- Incumbent; Gilberto Guerrero since April 1, 2024
- Office of the Attorney General
- Style: Mr. Deputy Attorney General (informal); The Honorable (formal)
- Member of: Judicial Branch
- Reports to: Attorney General
- Seat: Bogotá, D.C.
- Appointer: Attorney General; Supreme Court of Justice
- Term length: Four years, non renewable
- Formation: August 2, 2008
- First holder: Carlos Arrieta
- Website: www.fiscalia.gov.co

The Deputy Attorney General of Colombia (Deputy Attorney General of the Nation) is the second most important position in the Attorney General's Office of the Nation. It acts as support for the Attorney General of Colombia in the prosecution of all legal matters, with administrative and budgetary autonomy.

The deputy attorney general is nominated and elected by the attorney general at his or her discretion. The deputy attorney general acts as Acting Attorney General once the position of attorney general becomes vacant, while the Supreme Court of Justice selects a new attorney general from a list of candidates nominated by the President.

Gilberto Guerrero has been the deputy attorney general of Colombia since April 1, 2024

== List ==
No.	Portrait	Name	Prior experience	State of residence	Took office	Left office	Attorney General(s)
1		Carlos Arrieta	Lawyer	Bogotá, D.C.	August 1, 1992	August 1, 1994	Gustavo de Greiff
2		Francisco Cintura	Lawyer,	Bogotá, D.C.			— (Note: Following the vacancy in the office, the Supreme Court of Justice appointed Francisco Cintura as deputy attorney general to serve as acting attorney general.)
3		Jorge Armando Otálora	Lawyer,	Cundinamarca			Luis Camilo Osorio
4		Guillermo Mendoza	Jusrist,	Córdoba	September 27, 2006	January 11, 2011	Mario Iguarán
5		Juan Carlos Forero	Lawyer,	Cundinamarca	March 29, 2011	January 25, 2011	Viviane Morales
6		Wilson Alejandro Martínez	Jurist,	Bogotá, D.C.	January 25, 2011	March 6, 2012	Viviane Morales
7		Martha Lucía Zamora	Lawyer	Cundinamarca	March 6, 2011	March 29, 2011	Viviane Morales
8		Jorge Fernando Perdomo	Jurist and politician	Bogotá, D.C.	March 29, 2016	August 1, 2016	Luis Eduardo Montealegre
9		María Paulina Riveros	Lawyer	Bogotá, D.C.	August 2, 2016	May 15, 2019	Néstor Humberto Martínez
10		Fabio Espitia	Lawyer and jurist	Bogotá, D.C.	May 17, 2019	January 30, 2020	— (Note: Following the resignation of Néstor Humberto Martínez as Attorney General and María Paulina Riveros as Deputy Attorney General, the Supreme Court of Justice appointed Fabio Espitia as Deputy Attorney General to serve as Acting Attorney General.)
11		Martha Macera	Lawyer and jurist	Bogotá, D.C.	February 13, 2024	March 12, 2024	Francisco Barbosa
12		Hernando Toro	Lawyer,	Tolima	March 12, 2024	April 1, 2024	— (Note: Following the vacancy of Deputy Attorney General Martha Mancera, she was appointed Acting Attorney General by the Supreme Court of Justice.)
13		Gilberto Guerrero	Lawyer,	Nariño	April 1, 2024	Incumbent	Luz Adriana Camargo

== See also ==
- Judicial Branch of Colombia

== Notes ==
Order of precedence
Preceded by Magistrates and Councillors of the High Courts	Order of precedence of Colombia as Deputy Attorney General of Colombia	Succeeded by Silvano Gómez as Deputy Inspector General of Colombia
