= Guillermo Mendoza (lawyer) =

Colombian lawyer and jurist (born 1949)

Acting Attorney General of Colombia
- Acting; August 1, 2008 – January 11, 2011
- Preceded by: Mario Iguarán
- Succeeded by: Viviane Morales

2nd Deputy Attorney General of Colombia
- In office September 26, 2006 – July 31, 2008
- Appointed by: Mario Iguarán
- Preceded by: Jorge Armando Otálora
- Succeeded by: Martha Lucía Zamora

Personal details
- Born: Guillermo Ignacio Mendoza Diago; June 5, 1949 (age 77) Cienaga de Oro, Córdoba, Colombia
- Party: Independent (2008-present)
- Other political affiliations: Liberal (2002-2008)
- Spouse: Norah Vélez (m. 1994)
- Education: University of Cartagena (LLB)
- Profession: Lawyer; Jurist

Guillermo Ignacio Mendoza Diago (born June 5, 1949) is a Colombian lawyer and jurist who served as Deputy Attorney General of Colombia from 2006 to 2008 and as Acting Attorney General of Colombia from 2009 to 2011, appointed by the Constitutional Court during the election process of a new Attorney General.

Born in Cienaga de Oro, Córdoba, he graduated in law from the University of Cartagena and served as a Mixed Judge of San Andrés from 1974 to 1976 and subsequently as a Criminal Judge of Sincelejo from 1976 to 1979. Mendoza has been the Acting Attorney General with the longest term, a total of one year.

Legal offices
Preceded by Jorge Armando Otálora	Deputy Attorney General of Colombia; 2006-2008	Succeeded by Martha Lucía Zamora
Preceded by Mario Iguarán	Acting Attorney General of Colombia; 2008-2011	Succeeded by Viviane Morales
