= Gustavo de Greiff =

Colombian lawyer, educator and activist

Colombian Ambassador to Mexico
- In office 1995–1998
- President: Ernesto Samper
- Preceded by: Ramiro Osorio Fonseca
- Succeeded by: Diego Pardo Koppel

1st Attorney General of Colombia
- In office August 1, 1992 – August 17, 1994
- Nominated by: César Gaviria
- Deputy: Francisco Sintura
- Preceded by: Office established
- Succeeded by: Alfonso Valdivieso

115th Rector of Our Lady of the Rosary University
- In office October 24, 1990 – April 1, 1992
- Preceded by: Roberto Arias Pérez
- Succeeded by: Guillermo Salah Zuleta

Personal details
- Born: Gustavo José Joaquín de Greiff Restrepo; June 20, 1929 Bogotá, Colombia
- Died: July 19, 2018 (aged 89) Bogotá, Colombia
- Party: Liberal
- Spouse: Inés Lindo Koppel
- Children: Mónica de Greiff
- Education: Our Lady of the Rosary University
- Profession: Lawyer, educator

Gustavo José Joaquín de Greiff Restrepo (June 20, 1929 – July 19, 2018) was a Colombian lawyer, educator and activist, who served as Attorney General of Colombia during the Gaviria presidency and later as Ambassador to Mexico during the Samper presidency. He was an outspoken critic of the United States' war on drugs in Colombia, and an advocate for drug liberalization policies.

== Biography ==
De Greiff was born in Bogotá, D.C., on June 20, 1929, to Gustavo de Greiff Obregón and Cecilia Restrepo Piñeres. De Greiff was of Swedish descent by way of his father whose grandfather was Karl Sigismund Fromholt von Greiff, a Swedish engineer and geographer who moved to Colombia in 1825 and whose family had played an active role in the abdication of King Gustav IV Adolf of Sweden. He was married to Inés Lindo Koppel, and they have five children together: Mónica, also a lawyer and ex-Minister of Justice; Natalia, an engineer and ex-General Manager of IBM in Colombia; Gustavo, who is the founder of Knee Voice; Pablo, a professor at NYU; and Veronica who married Ajay K Wakhloo who is the chief of Neurointerventional Radiology.

A lawyer who graduated from Our Lady of the Rosary University, de Greiff returned to his alma mater, where he worked as a professor of introduction to law and insurance law at the Faculty of Law, later becoming deputy rector under Rector Roberto Arias Pérez and subsequently replacing him as the 115th Rector of the University on October 24, 1990, until April 1, 1991.

In addition to his tenure at El Rosario University, de Greiff worked as professor of civil law at the National University of Colombia, and professor at the Graduate Faculty of Political Science at the National Autonomous University of Mexico, while also participating as a conference speaker at different events in other participating centers of education.

== Attorney general ==
In 1992, as part of the changes in government following the ratification of the 1991 constitution, de Greiff was tapped for the position of attorney general of the newly institutionalized Office of the Attorney General of Colombia, making him the top prosecutor of the nation. De Greiff was selected by the Supreme Court out of the ternary presented by President César Gaviria Trujillo, which also included Hugo Escobar Sierra and Guillermo Salah Zuleta (his former deputy rector, and subsequent successor at El Rosario University).

When de Greiff started as attorney general, he was faced with the monumental challenge of determining the course of the Office of the Attorney General, and was entrusted with repairing the reputation of Colombia as a safe haven for criminals and drug lords, and facing the various tactical inconveniences of a new agency such as operating from a hotel in central Bogotá as there was no building for the Office of the Attorney General at the time. De Greiff from the onset took the role of the Attorney General as an autonomous entity within the government very seriously which alienated members of the executive, angered legislators and drove the judiciary to take action while raising his public image and standing but at the same time angering foreign powers.

=== Escobar and the drug cartels ===
The first challenge for de Greiff happened before he even assumed his new position and involved dealing with the conditions of the incarceration of Pablo Escobar, a notorious drug kingpin and boss of the Medellín Cartel who had recently voluntarily surrendered to the authorities, but as the media had shown, was living a life of luxury in his own personal jail La Catedral where he continued running the cartel. De Greiff wanted to move Escobar out of La Catedral to a more secure prison where the authorities could "see, look, inform on, and prevent irregular acts such as murders and other settlings of accounts that were performing in the prison". Escobar, however, managed to escape during this arranged transportation which started a massive manhunt for him aided by the United States and the United Kingdom. His outspoken remarks against Escobar, someone feared by most politicians and journalists however, popularized him and catapulted him into the media spotlight, as a brave prosecutor who would take a stance against crime and follow the due process of law, a path which would inadvertently render him the most threatened man in Colombia. Having garnered enough public support, in December 1992, de Greiff went on to readdress cases like those of 6 innocent men headed by Barranquilla chemical Alberto Jubiz Hazbun, wrongfully jailed since August 22, 1989, in a suspicious search seizure to an office in connection with politician leader Luis Carlos Galán's assassination, De Greiff achieved showing that were injustice victim. First, the men weren't at Soacha in Galan's death moment, second, the witnesses in their against were mentally disordered or paid and third, that the 9mm Gun nor Submachine-gun Uzi, firearms allegedly seized, weren't fired. That's why, Jubiz and the other 6 innocents were unconditionally released on March 2, 1993 due De Greiff request after reviewing case.

The Office of the Attorney General was primarily in charge of the investigation against Escobar's escape and future apprehension, facilitating clues and aiding in his apprehension, de Greiff, however was under pressure from foreign governments who feared that his office was going to grant Escobar a deal to surrender which would not punish Escobar accordingly. This all ended on December 2, 1993, when Escobar was gunned down after he tried to escape when authorities discovered his location.

After Escobar's death, several other criminals belonging to the group Los Pepes, who were in hiding for fear of Escobar's reprisals, agreed to surrender under a new law initiated by the Attorney General. This aimed to get drug traffickers off the streets by surrendering themselves to receive reduced sentences if they confessed their crimes and surrendered their ill-gotten gains, with further reductions if they provided testimony against other criminals. De Greiff was harshly criticized for this program by U.S. and Colombian law enforcement officials who accused him of providing amnesty for criminals.

In another controversial incident, de Greiff was criticized after he held a private meeting with three suspected drug traffickers. They had reached out to him in hopes of working out a deal for leniency if they surrendered to the authorities. The problem however was that the suspects had no arrest warrants in Colombia and the United States, and after informing both authorities of their presence in his office he was not able to get charges to arrest them.

De Greiff responded harshly to his detractors; in response to a letter from the Ministry of Justice de Greiff said: "I am old enough to not have the Minister of Justice protect me from a hoax."

=== Stance on drugs ===
In November 1993, de Greiff attended the International Drug Policy Reform Conference in Baltimore, Maryland, to discuss issues relating to drug policy. De Greiff became the center of attention and target of a very harsh and organized response by the American and Colombian Government after he made statements saying that fighting drug trafficking was a lost cause and that legalization of drugs would cut black market demand for them, arguing that the drug consumption in the United States fueled drug production in Colombia which fed violence.

A kilo of cocaine costs $50 in the trafficking countries and is sold in the consuming countries for $5,000 to $10,000, and so there always will be someone ready to run the risk of the illegitimate business.

— Gustavo de Greiff,

De Greiff's comments drew swift condemnation from Colombia's President, Cesar Gaviria Trujillo, who rebuked de Greiff in a letter released to the press, and went on to state "Legalization is not the solution, ... our policy against drug trafficking based on prohibition, the strengthening of justice, the exchange of information and international legal cooperation, will remain unaltered."

In the United States, de Greiff's comments only fuelled an existing opposition against the Colombian Attorney General and they were used as evidence of de Greiff's compromised relations with drug lords. Speaking before the U.S. Senate Foreign Relations Committee Subcommittee on Terrorism, Jo Ann Harris, Assistant Attorney General for the Criminal Division, called the behavior of de Greiff "most disturbing" and said that it "jeopardized" the U.S. evidence-sharing program with that country. Senator John Kerry, then chairman of the subcommittee escalated the situation by directly stating that he was "deeply disturbed" by de Greiff's actions. This led the US Department of State in March of that year to suspend an evidence-sharing program with the Office of the Attorney General citing that his actions suggested a willingness to make accommodations with drug traffickers.

De Greiff defended himself by calling Gaviria's statements desperate attempts to appease the ire of the United States and by calling Senator Kerry a liar and implying that his comments served only to undermine Colombia's law and autonomy. De Greiff accused the US government of mounting "a campaign of innuendo and falsified facts" against him, and accused his US counterpart Janet Reno of acting out in defense of her failed Drug War. De Greiff went on to clarify that he never mean to advocate for the legalization of drugs, but rather to criticize the excessive emphasis on battling drug trafficking and less on fighting consumption, which generated a double market for traffickers.

De Greiff received the Richard J. Dennis Drugpeace Award for Outstanding Achievement in the Field of Drug Policy Reform for epitomizing loyal opposition to drug war extremism.

=== Problems with the United States ===
De Greiff was at one point the toughest and most important partner the United States had in its war on drugs, but he had fallen from the grace of the Clinton Administration by November 1993 when he had come out in favor of legalizing the use of drugs, the Clinton administration had also come out against de Greiff's attempts to negotiate with drug lords and guerrilla members to surrender in exchange for reduced sentences, which the United States Department of Justice classified as "outrageous". A frustrated de Greiff in turn described the Clinton Administration's refusal to study legalization of drugs as "not an ostrich policy, but a McCarthyite, Stalinist, fascist policy", and when confronted by Senator Roberto Gerlein Echeverría on why he had gone to the United States to talk about drug legalization he responded: "You are right, Doctor Gerlein, when you say that my mistake was talking in the United States about legalization, but I suffer from a rare illness of the spine that prevents me from bowing before the powerful". This was the termination of the evidence sharing agreement between the two nations. For the United States, this was a direct result of the American Government's disapproval of de Greiff actions, this in turn forced the Colombian Government to come out in defense of de Greiff in spite of their own personal disagreements with the Attorney General, saying "the Government does not share any point of view, calling into question the sincerity and firmness of the Attorney General in its fight against drug trafficking". The United States and Colombia found themselves in a diplomatic row over de Greiff with the US Department of State and the Colombian Ministry of Foreign Affairs exchanging letters, the U.S. calling de Greiff's intrusion in the case of Dandeny Muñoz Mosquera improper, while Colombia accusing Senator John Kerry of using his senatorial pulpit to damage the image of Colombia and misrepresenting de Greiff. In 1995 under a provision which denies entry into the United States to anyone believed to have assisted drug traffickers, the U.S. rescinded de Greiff's visa further preventing him to enter the United States after accusing de Greiff of having links to the Cali cartel, charges which he denied.

=== Problems with the Church ===
De Greiff stirred up some Colombian officials of Catholic Church when he directly accused Monsignors Leonardo Gómez Serna, Bishop of the Diocese of Socorro y San Gil, Nel Hedye Beltrán Santamaria, Bishop of the Diocese of Sincelejo, Darío Castrillón Hoyos, Archbishop of the Archdiocese of Bucaramanga, Luis Madrid Merlano, Bishop of the Diocese of Tibú, and Oscar Angel Bernal, Bishop of the Diocese of Girardota of direct links to the FARC. The accusations stemmed out of a private meeting Mgr Gómez Serna had with the 23rd Front of the FARC out of which he revealed that the Paramilitarists and not the FARC were responsible for recent attacks in the Vélez Province of Santander; de Greiff interpreted this meeting as advocating for the terrorist groups and accused the bishops of being relays of the FARC and criticized the Church for ignoring the law of Colombia which states that no person shall be in communication with the guerrillas be it the President of the prelates. The accusations drew quick condemnation from the Colombian Episcopal Conference, its President Mgr Pedro Rubiano Sáenz defended the bishops and vowed that the Church in Colombia would continue its duty of ministry to all baptised Colombians regardless of their occupation and alluded that what de Greiff was doing was ignoring the basic principle of the Constitution of Colombia which guarantees freedom of religion, and under that principle, bishops, priests or other member of the church can be in communication with its members. This incident escalated to international proportions when the Vatican's Nuncio to Colombia, Monsignor Paolo Romeo came out in defense of Mgr Gómez Serna and undermined the actions of the Prosecutor by comparing them to the ancient persecutions of the Church, "in other times the Church has seen its people taken to court and even sentenced to death" said the Nuncio and added "The lost sheep cannot return to its herd if one does not look for it.".

De Greiff explained that the Office of the Attorney General would investigate whether the actions of the clergy were carried out as part of its religious commitment or were part of a political agenda. Additional the National Committee of Victims of the Guerrilla (Spanish: Comité Nacional de Víctimas de la guerrilla (Vida)) had previously filed a formal complaint in August 1993 against Mgr Gómez Serna for presumed crimes of complicity and aiding and abetting subversion, likewise other complaints had been filed against other members of the clergy but had been filed away. After much deliberation, on March 27, 1994, de Greiff announced that his office was not competent to continue the investigations on the bishops and that the cases would be handed off to the Ecclesiastical court. The Office of the Attorney General arrived at this decision after convening with Chancellor Noemí Sanín, Inspector General Carlos Gustavo Arrieta, the Apostolic Nuncio, and members of the Episcopal Conference. The Office of the Inspector General found that the Office of the Attorney General could not investigate the bishops because of the existing concordat with The Holy See based on Article 19 of Law 20 of 1974 which states that members of the clergy can only be investigated by the ecclesiastical courts which are ruled by canon law, and that based on the Vienna Convention on the Law of Treaties the Government of Colombia had to uphold the concordat even if there are constitutional grounds to investigate the prelates.

The controversy did not damage the ties of the Government and the Church in the long run, but both sides did make amends and changes in policy in relation to one another. The Church in Colombia even went on to defend de Greiff from his critics stating that: "At the moment of truth the Prosecutor has wanted to stick to the legislation. If this was wrong, it is not a problem of the Prosecutor, he did not create it [the legislation]."

=== Forced retirement ===
On June 20, 1994. de Greiff turned 65 years old. This usually celebratory event, however, brought on an investigation by the Colombian Supreme Court. According to Colombian law, members of the judicial branch undergo mandatory retirement when they reach the age of 65. Although the attorney general was not directly part of the judicial branch, many believed the office should fall under the same constrains of the judiciary. Additionally, the Fundamental Charter, which created the Office of the Attorney General, required that the attorney general meet "the same qualifications required to be a magistrate of the Supreme Court". Magistrates from the Civil and Labour Chambers of the High Tribunal of the Court were of the opinion that the attorney general should not be subject to the same norms as those of the high courts in the absence of any statutory law that would address the matter. In a final decision of 12 votes against 8, the Plenary of the Supreme Court determined that de Greiff would have to retire because of his age. de Greiff consequently retired on August 17 and received the Order of Military Merit Antonio Nariño from President Gaviria for his service to the nation. On May 4, 1995 the First Session of the Colombian Council of State overturned the decision of the Plenary Court by a vote of eight magistrates to zero with two abstaining. But the new decision did not change much, because President Ernesto Samper had already appointed Alfonso Valdivieso Sarmiento as new attorney general and had appointed de Greiff as Ambassador to Mexico. Nevertheless, the decision set a precedent and clarified the role of the attorney general.

De Greiff was extremely popular in Colombia during his term as attorney general and considered a hero by many. He achieved high and stable opinion poll ratings, with higher approval percentages than those of the President and other public officials.

== Ambassadorship ==
After de Greiff retired as Attorney General he was given a diplomatic post as Colombia's Ambassador to the United States of Mexico. Some of the challenges he faced during his time as ambassador included allegations of corruption and bribe taking, the cancellation of his United States travel visa, protesters who wanted him declared persona non grata in Mexico, and assisting with Ernesto Samper's presidential visit to Mexico. De Greiff was one of the few Colombian ambassadors who did not resign following the political scandal that directly linked President Samper to drug cartels and guerrilla members.

== Later life and death ==
After leaving politics, Gustavo de Greiff returned to his private practice and was appointed by Grant Thornton LLP, one of the largest international accounting and management consulting firms, manager in the firm's international business center, leading the firm's business development efforts in Latin America. Although de Greiff did not return to politics he continued advocating for decriminalization of drug use and speaking out against the war on drugs as a notable speaker and LEAP Advisory Board Member.

De Greiff died on July 19, 2018, at the age of 89.

== Works ==
- De Greiff Restrepo, Gustavo (1992). La contratación mercantil y otros aspectos comerciales (in Spanish). Colegio de Abogados de Medellín. Medellín: Biblioteca Jurídica Diké. ISBN 978-958-9276-28-0. OCLC 318349733.
- De Greiff Restrepo, Gustavo; et al. (1993). El principio del pez gordo : estrategias para combatir la corrupción [The Beginning of the Fat Fish: Strategies to Combat Corruption] (in Spanish). Bogotá: Editorial Planeta Colombiana. ISBN 978-958-614-401-8. OCLC 318335827.
- De Greiff Restrepo, Gustavo; de Greiff Lindo, Pablo (2000). Moralidad, legalidad y drogas [Morality, Legality and Drugs] (in Spanish). Fondo de Cultura Económica. ISBN 978-968-16-6185-4. OCLC 277198734.

== In popular culture ==
- Is portrayed by actor Fernando Corredor as the character of Gonzalo de Griffin in 2013 TV series Tres Caínes. Corredor reprises his role in En la boca del lobo as the character of Attorney De Graudoff.
- Is portrayed by Germán Jaramillo in the second season of the Netflix drama Narcos.

== See also ==
- Plan Colombia
- Illegal drug trade in Colombia
