= Francisco Barbosa =

Colombian lawyer (born 1974)

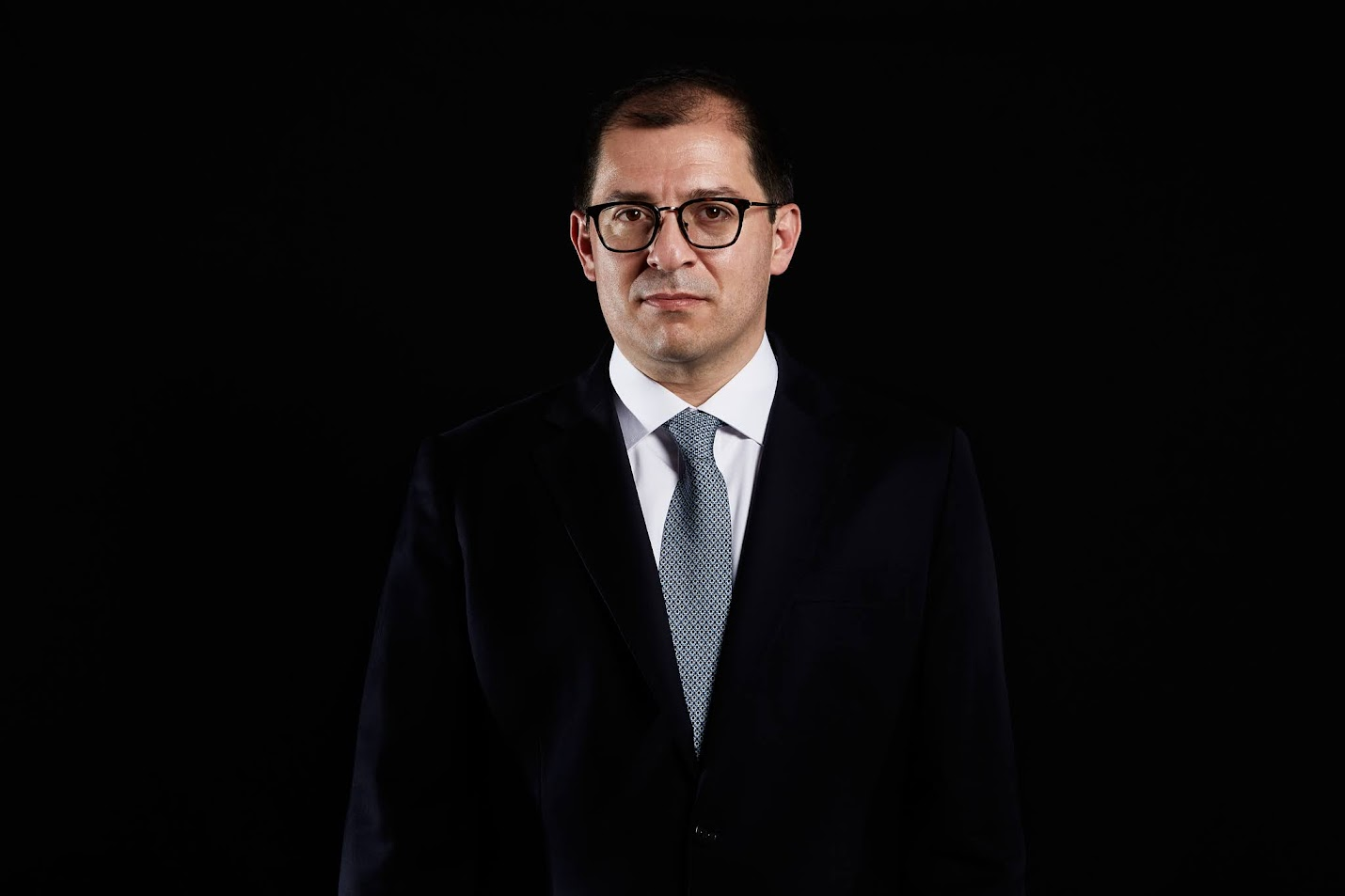

9th Attorney General of Colombia
- In office February 13, 2020 – February 13, 2024
- Nominated by: Iván Duque
- Deputy: Martha Mancera
- Preceded by: Néstor Humberto Martínez
- Succeeded by: Luz Adriana Camargo

President of the Ibero-American Association of Public Prosecutors
- In office July 29, 2022 – February 2, 2024
- Preceded by: Jorge Abbott
- Succeeded by: Eduardo Casal

Presidential Advisor for Human Rights and International Affairs
- In office August 13, 2018 – February 13, 2020
- President: Iván Duque
- Preceded by: Paula Gaviria
- Succeeded by: Nancy Patricia Gutiérrez

Personal details
- Born: Francisco Roberto Barbosa Delagado; January 11, 1974 (age 52) Bogotá, D.C., Colombia
- Party: Independent (2022-present)
- Other political affiliations: Democratic Center (2018-2022)
- Education: Sergio Arboleda University
- Profession: Lawyer

Francisco Roberto Barbosa Delgado (born January 11, 1974) is a Colombian lawyer and academic who served from 2018 to 2020 as Presidential Advisor for Human Rights and International Affairs and from 2020 to 2024 as the 9th Attorney General of Colombia.

== Career ==
Barbosa studied at the Sergio Arboleda University where he would later meet Iván Duque, 33rd president of Colombia and from which he would graduate in 2000. He would later obtain his degree as a specialist in International Relations from the university at the Jorge Tadeo Lozano University. In 2006 he would complete a master's degree in history at the Pontifical Xavierian University, later in 2007 he would pursue a master's degree in Public Law at the Externado University of Colombia and then a specialization in Regulation and Management of Telecommunications and New Technologies at the same university. In 2020 he would obtain his degree as a Doctor in Public Law from the University of Nantes, France.

Legal offices
Preceded by Néstor Humberto Martínez	Attorney General of Colombia; 2020-2024	Succeeded by Luz Adriana Camargo
