= Jorge Armando Otálora =

Colombian lawyer (born 1967)

Ombudsman of Colombia
- In office September 2, 2012 – January 27, 2016
- Preceded by: Volmar Pérez
- Succeeded by: Carlos Negret

3rd Deputy Attorney General of Colombia
- In office June 2, 2005 – September 30, 2006
- Appointed by: Luis Camilo Osorio
- Preceded by: Francisco Cintura
- Succeeded by: Guillermo Mendoza

Personal details
- Born: Jorge Armando Otálora Gómez; January 25, 1967 (age 59) Chocontá, Cundinamarca, Colombia
- Party: Independent (2006-present)
- Education: Catholic University of Colombia (LLB); Universidad Externado de Colombia
- Profession: Lawyer; jurist

Jorge Armando Otálora Gómez (born January 25, 1967) is a Colombian lawyer and politician who served as Ombudsman of Colombia from 2012 to 2016 under President Juan Manuel Santos. Otálora served as Deputy Attorney General of Colombia.

Born in Chocontá, Cundinamarca, he holds a law degree from the Catholic University of Colombia and a specialization in criminal and criminological sciences from the Universidad Externado de Colombia.

Legal offices
| Preceded by Francisco Cintura | Deputy Attorney General of Colombia; 2005-2006 | Succeeded by Guillermo Mendoza |
| Preceded by Volmar Pérez | Ombudsman of Colombia; 2012-2016 | Succeeded by Carlos Negret |
