= Mario Iguarán =

Colombian lawyer and politician

Mario Germán Iguarán Arana
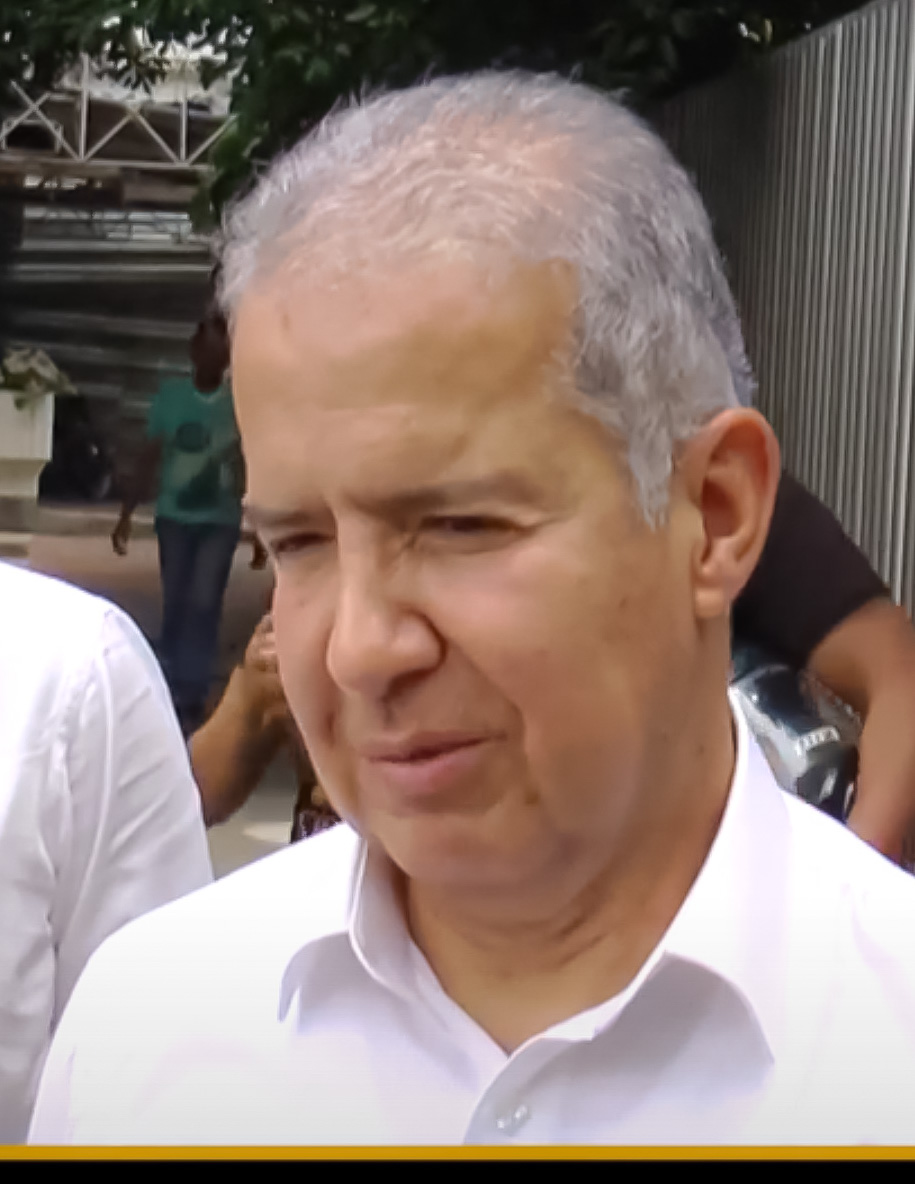

Colombia Ambassador to Egypt
- In office 27 June 2010 – 2012
- President: Juan Manuel Santos
- Preceded by: Guillermo Antonio Vanegas

5th Attorney General of Colombia
- In office 1 August 2005 – 31 July 2009
- Nominated by: Álvaro Uribe
- Deputy: Guillermo Mendoza
- Preceded by: Luis Camilo Osorio
- Succeeded by: Viviane Morales

Deputy Minister of Justice of Colombia
- In office 29 March 2004 – 1 August 2005
- President: Álvaro Uribe
- Preceded by: Rafael Nieto Loaiza
- Succeeded by: Luis Hernando Angarita Figueredo

Personal details
- Born: 8 June 1960 (age 66) Bogotá, D.C., Colombia
- Spouse: Lucero Saavedra
- Children: Daniela Iguarán Saavedra; David Iguarán Saavedra
- Education: Externado University (LLB, 1982); University of Bonn (LLM, 1990)
- Profession: Lawyer

Mario Germán Iguarán Arana (born 8 June 1960) is a Colombian lawyer and diplomat. He served as Ambassador of Colombia to Egypt between 2010 and 2012. Iguarán has also served as the 3rd Deputy Minister of Justice of Colombia, the 5th Attorney General of Colombia, and as Assistant Magistrate of the Constitutional Court of Colombia.

== Career ==
Iguarán received his Bachelor of Law from the Externado University of Colombia in 1982, and obtained a Master in Comparative Law from the University of Bonn in Germany in 1990, and has completed specializations in Penal Cassation from La Gran Colombia University in 2003, and in High State Administration from the Colombian Higher School of Public Administration in 1998.

=== Ambassadorship ===
President Uribe offered Iguarán an ambassadorship to Switzerland following the end of his term as Attorney General, but the Swiss Government expressed their disapproval of said appointment, because Iguarán had investigated a Swiss national, Jean Pierre Gontard, for cooperation with the FARC-EP. Gontard, who was working with the permission of the Swiss and Colombian authorities as a mediator, was suspected to have gone beyond his role by aiding the FARC rebels and their associates in Europe and was called in for questioning, he however was also a close friend and associate of Swiss Federal Councillor Micheline Calmy-Rey who is also the Swiss Foreign Minister in charge of approving ambassadorial appointments to Switzerland; in the end Iguarán was dropped from consideration to this mission.

Nonetheless, President Uribe offered him another diplomatic post, and this time the host nation permitted it; Iguarán was sworn in as Ambassador Extraordinary and Plenipotentiary of Colombia to the Republic of Egypt by Chancellor Jaime Bermúdez Merizalde on 2 March 2010 and travelling that same day to Egypt to assume his official duties, and presented his letters of credence to Egypt's President Hosni Mubarak on 27 June 2010.

He served as ambassador until early 2012.

== See also ==
- David Sánchez Juliao
