= Luz Adriana Camargo =

Colombian lawyer and attorney (born 1965)

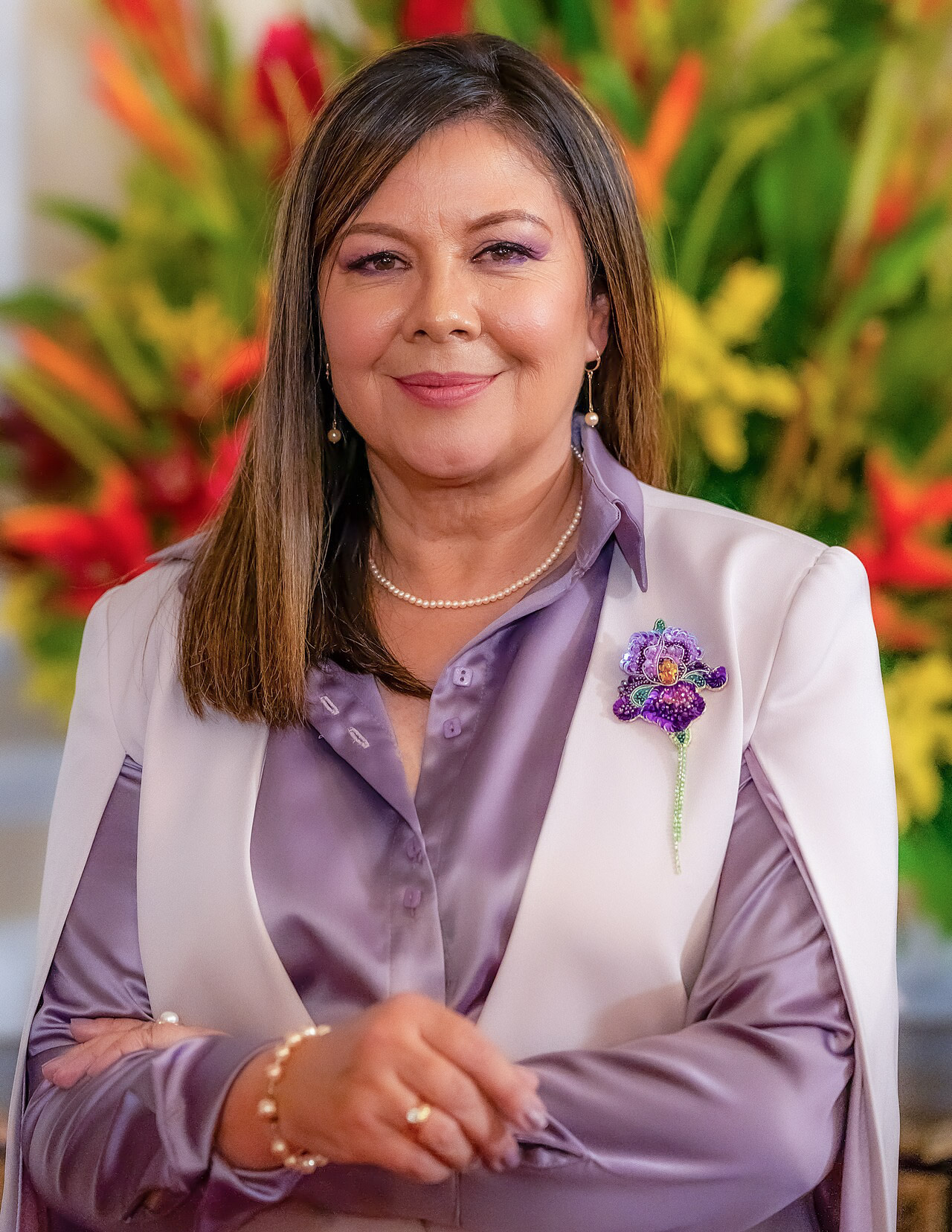
- Inaugural portrait, 2024

10th Attorney General of Colombia
- Incumbent
- Assumed office March 22, 2024
- Nominated by: Gustavo Petro
- Deputy: Gilberto Guerrero
- Preceded by: Francisco Barbosa

Head of Investigation and Litigation of the International Commission against Impunity in Guatemala
- In office May 5, 2014 – September 9, 2017
- Secretary-General: Ban Ki-moon; António Guterres
- Preceded by: Position established
- Succeeded by: Position abolished

Personal details
- Born: Luz Adriana Camargo Garzón; October 13, 1965 (age 60) Bogotá, D.C., Colombia
- Party: Independent
- Spouse: Germán Marroquín (m. 1992)
- Children: 2
- Education: University of La Sabana
- Profession: Lawyer; criminologist

Luz Adriana Camargo Garzón (born October 13, 1965) is a Colombian lawyer and criminologist who has served as Attorney General of Colombia since 2024.

Camargo is a law graduate of the University of La Sabana. She later served as an assistant magistrate in the criminal appeals chamber of the Supreme Court of Justice. Following this, she was invited to work alongside Iván Velásquez Gómez at the International Commission against impunity in Guatemala.

In February 2024, she was among the candidates selected by President Gustavo Petro for Attorney General. She was subsequently elected in March 2024 and took office on March 22, becoming the second woman to hold this position after Viviane Morales.

== Early life and career ==
Luz Adriana Camargo Garzón was born on October 13, 1965, in Bogotá, D.C. She attended María Mazzarello School, graduating in 1981. She then entered the University of La Sabana, where she earned a law degree in 1986. In 1990, she completed a double specialization in criminal Law and criminology at the Free University of Colombia.

On 2 June 2025, a Guatemalan appeals court acting on a request by the office of the Attorney General of Guatemala ordered the arrest of Camargo over her role in CICIG.

Legal offices
Preceded by Francisco Barbosa	Attorney General of Colombia; 2024-present	Incumbent
Order of precedence
Preceded by Álvaro González as Counselor for National Reconciliation	Order of precedence of Colombia as Attorney General of Colombia since March 22, 2024	Succeeded by General Hugo Alejandro López as General Commander of the Military Forces
