= Gilberto Guerrero =

Deputy Attorney General of Colombia since 2025

12th Deputy Attorney General of Colombia
- Incumbent
- Assumed office April 1, 2025
- Appointed by: Luz Adriana Camargo
- Preceded by: Hernan Toro

Personal details
- Born: Gilberto Javier Guerrero Díaz; 1960 (age 65–66) Pasto, Nariño, Colombia
- Party: Independent (2025-present)
- Education: University of Nariño (LLB); Santiago de Cali University; Universidad Externado de Colombia
- Profession: Lawyer; professor

Gilberto Javier Guerrero Díaz (c. 1960) is a Colombian lawyer specializing in criminal and criminological sciences who has served as 12th Deputy Attorney General of Colombia since 2025. A specialist in constitutional law, he has served as a mixed municipal judge in San Pablo, a municipal criminal judge in Ipiales, Nariño, a circuit criminal judge, an auxiliary magistrate in the Criminal Cassation Chamber of the Supreme Court of Justice, and director of the Cali Section.

Born in Pasto, Nariño, he graduated in law from the University of Nariño. He served as a trainer at the School of Criminal Investigation and Forensic Sciences of the Office of the Attorney General. He has served as a professor at the University of Nariño and Cooperative University of Colombia.

Legal offices
Preceded by Hernan Toro	Deputy Attorney General of Colombia; 2025-present	Incumbent
Order of precedence
Preceded by Magistrates and Councillors of the High Courts	Order of precedence of Colombia as Deputy Attorney General of Colombia since April 1, 2025	Succeeded by Silvano Gómez as Deputy Inspector General of Colombia
