= Rafael Vergara Navarro =

Colombian lawyer and environmentalist

- Born: 13 January 1949; Cartagena, Colombia
- Died: 16 August 2022 (aged 73)
- Education: Universidad Externado de Colombia
- Occupations: lawyer, environmentalist

Rafael Vergara Navarro (Cartagena, Colombia 13 January 1949–16 August 2022) was a Colombian lawyer, and environmentalist.

== Life ==
Vergara was born in Cartagena, Colombia. He was the son of local politician Rafael Vergara Támara. He studied Law at Universidad Externado de Colombia, graduating in 1972, and later would work at Superintendencia Bancaria, until 1978.

In 1977, he co-directed the documentary "Cementerio Largo".

=== 19th of April Movement ===
Vergara had grown, at some point, to hold revolutionary beliefs which led him to join the 19th of April Movement. After feeling pressure against his political ideas, he obtained asylum in México in 1979, where he resided for 12 years.

=== Career ===
During his career as a lawyer, Vergara persistently worked in cases defending mangroves, and opposing the invasion of vacant State lots. He worked for Caracol Radio as an op ed writer. Vergara had an affinity towards journalism.

== Family ==
He had four children.
