= Andrés González Díaz =

Colombian politician

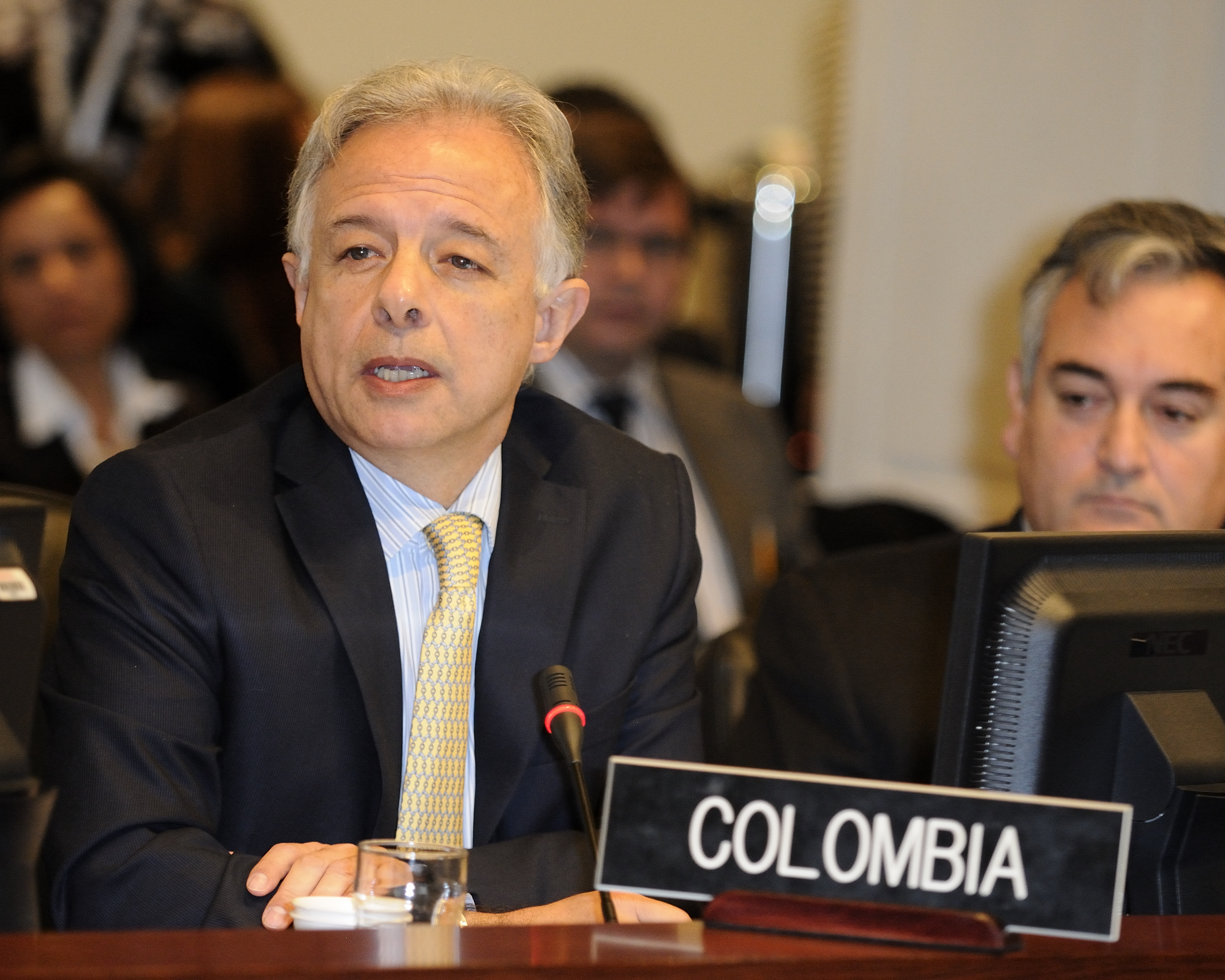
- Ambassador González at the OAS in 2012.

Permanent Representative of Colombia to the Organization of American States
- Incumbent
- Assumed office 30 March 2012
- President: Juan Manuel Santos Calderón
- Preceded by: Luis Alfonso Hoyos Aristizábal

Governor of Cundinamarca
- In office 1 January 2008 – 1 January 2012
- Preceded by: Pablo Ardila Sierra
- Succeeded by: Álvaro Cruz Vargas
- In office 1 January 1998 – 1 January 2001
- Preceded by: David Aljure Ramírez
- Succeeded by: Álvaro Cruz Vargas
- In office 22 July 1991 – 2 January 1992
- Appointed by: César Gaviria Trujillo
- Preceded by: Hernando Aguilera Blanco
- Succeeded by: Manuel Guillermo Infante Braiman

Senator of Colombia
- In office 20 July 2002 – 20 July 2006

1st Minister of Justice and Law of Colombia
- In office 7 July 1992 – 7 August 1994
- President: César Gaviria Trujillo
- Succeeded by: Néstor Humberto Martínez Neira

Personal details
- Born: 7 July 1955 (age 71) Bogotá, D.C., Colombia
- Party: Liberal
- Spouse: Inés Elvira Shuk Aparicio (1997–present)
- Children: Manuel Andrés González Schuler; Pascual González Shuk; Alejandro González Shuk
- Education: Externado University (JD, ); Paris Institute of Political Studies (DEA, 1986)
- Profession: Lawyer
- Website: www.andresgonzalezdiaz.com

Andrés González Díaz (born 7 July 1955) is the Permanent Representative of Colombia to the Organization of American States since 2012. A Liberal party politician, he served as Governor of Cundinamarca on three occasions, first from 1991 to 1992 appointed by President César Gaviria Trujillo, and popularly elected twice, from 1998 to 2001, and again from 2008 to 2012. He has also served as Senator of Colombia, and Minister of Justice and Law of Colombia.

A lawyer from Externado University with graduate studies from SciencesPo, he is married to Inés Elvira Shuck Aparicio since 1997, and has three children: Manuel Andrés, Pascual, and Alejandro.

== Selected works ==
- González Díaz, Andrés (1982). Ministros del Siglo XX. Colección Presidencia de la República (in Spanish). Bogotá: Colombia, National Printing Office. OCLC 253985471.
- González Díaz, Andrés (1986). La violence en Colombie: 1946-1960 (in French). Paris: Institut d'études politiques de Paris. OCLC 492064492.
