= Mónica de Greiff =

Colombian lawyer and former Justice Minister

Mónica de Greiff Lindo

Minister of Justice of Colombia
- In office 16 July 1989 – 22 September 1989
- President: Virgilio Barco Vargas
- Preceded by: Guillermo Plazas Alcid
- Succeeded by: Roberto Salazar Manrique

Personal details
- Born: 6 November 1956 (age 69) Bogotá, D.C., Colombia
- Party: Liberal
- Spouse: Miguel Paley
- Relations: Gustavo de Greiff Restrepo (father)
- Education: Our Lady of the Rosary University
- Profession: Lawyer

Mónica de Greiff Lindo (born November 6, 1956) is a Colombian lawyer.

== Early years ==
She started practicing her profession as a recognized litigation lawyer in the public sector, but later began working in the private sector. First, she was a General Secretary of the Colmena Fiduciary and later General Manager of the cinematographic production company Casablanca. After that, she was called by the President of the Republic, Virgilio Barco Vargas to occupy the Viceministry of Mines and Energy and later the Viceminister of Justice.

== Minister of Justice ==
She was appointed Minister of Justice by President Virgilio Barco Vargas on 16 July 1989 to replace Guillermo Plazas Alcid. In September 1989 she assumed the position of Minister of Justice and Rights, being the first woman in Colombia to do so; by that time she was the eighth designated person in this department in the last three years, due to the constant threats of the drug traffickers on whom she was exercising such charges. De Greiff was in charge of the signing of the treaty of extradition to the United States of drug traffickers, the fact that it occurred after the death of the presidential candidate, Luis Carlos Galán. At the beginning of 1990 she had to resign and leave the country, precisely because of the threats, but after she signed it she admitted that she was "obligated to resign by the president Virgilio Barco" and that the extradition was the most difficult point of this war against the mafia.

== Secretary of Economic Development of Bogotá ==
The City Mayor of Bogotá Samuel Moreno Rojas designated, in January 2008, De Greiff as the District Secretary of Economic Development, being one of its main goals the creation of a similar structure to the one she was managing, with the name of Capital Bank.

== Shortlist of Candidates for electing the Fiscal General of the Nation ==
On 13 March the president of Colombia, Juan Manuael Santos included in the second candidate for the fiscal election, along with the ex-president of the Constitutional Court of Colombia, Eduardo Montealagre, and also the lawyer María Luisa Mesa, who carried out as the counselor of the University of Rosario. This candidate was convened on 12 March in 2012, as the president of the Republic Juan Manuel Santos Calderon for the institutional period of 2009–2013. The term, however, was interrupted before the annulment of the election of the previous Fiscal General of the Nation, Vivianne Morales.

== Personal life ==
Born in Bogotá, D.C., Colombia on 6 November 1956, she is the eldest daughter of Gustavo de Greiff Restrepo and Inés Lindo Koppel. She has 4 siblings; Natalia, Gustavo, Pablo, and Veronica. She is of Swedish descent through her father and of Danish descent through her mother. She is married to the Argentine Miguel Paley and together they have one son.

== See also ==
- León de Greiff
- Viviane Morales Hoyos
