= Permanent Representative of Colombia to the Organization of American States =

- Representante Permanente de Colombia ante la Organización de los Estados Americanos
- Incumbent; Luis Ernesto Vargas since 23 September 2022
- Style: His Excellency
- Appointer: Gustavo Petro as President of Colombia
- Term length: No fixed term
- Inaugural holder: Alfonso López Pumarejo
- Salary: US$10,000 (monthly)
- Website: Delegation's Website

The Permanent Representative of Colombia to the OAS is the Permanent Representative of the Republic of Colombia to the Organization of American States.

The Permanent Representative is Chief of Mission of the delegation of Colombia, and highest representative of the Government of Colombia to the OAS charged with representing the interests of the President and Government of Colombia during all plenary meetings of the General Assembly and its subsidiary bodies. The officeholder however, is one of the high-ranking Colombian diplomat in the United States, the other two being the Ambassador of Colombia to the United States also in Washington, D.C., and the Permanent Representative of Colombia to the United Nations in New York City. The current Permanent Representative is Luis Ernesto Vargas.
