= Luis Eduardo Montealegre =

Colombian government official (born 1957)

Eduardo Montealegre
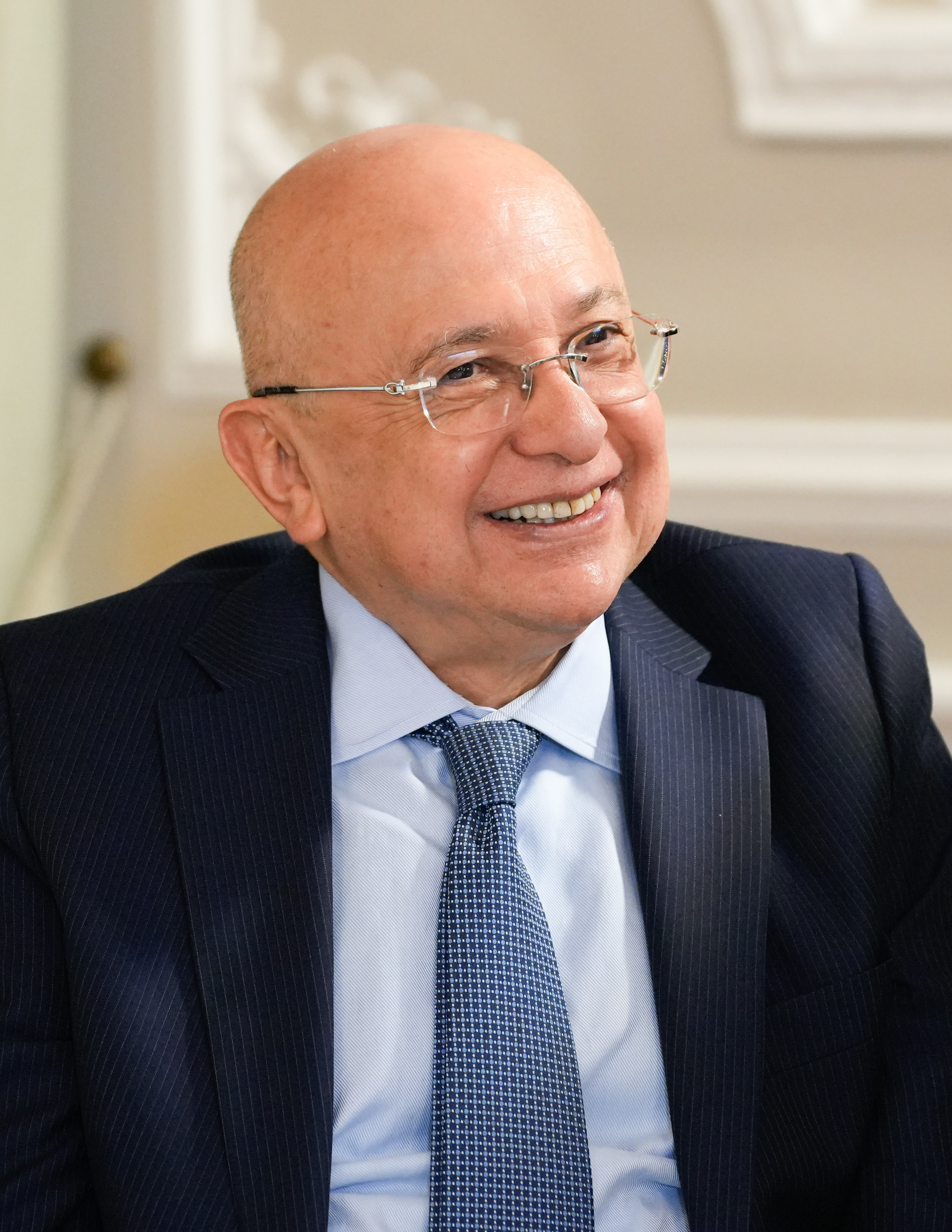
- Montealegre in June 2025.

Minister of Justice and Law
- In office June 13, 2025 – August 7, 2026
- President: Gustavo Petro
- Preceded by: Ángela María Buitrago

7th Attorney General of Colombia
- In office March 29, 2012 – March 28, 2016
- Nominated by: Juan Manuel Santos
- Deputy: Jorge Fernando Perdomo
- Preceded by: Viviane Morales
- Succeeded by: Néstor Humberto Martínez

Magistrate of the Constitutional Court
- In office January 1, 2001 – May 1, 2004
- Preceded by: Antonio Barrera Carbonell
- Succeeded by: Humberto Sierra

Personal details
- Born: Luis Eduardo Montealegre Lynett; October 14, 1957 (age 68) Ibague, Tolima, Colombia
- Party: Independent (2020-present)
- Other political affiliations: Liberal (2001-2010)
- Spouse: Tania Hernández (m. 2000)
- Education: Universidad Externado de Colombia (LLB); University of Bonn; University of Erlangen-Nuremberg; Complutense University of Madrid
- Profession: Lawyer; jurist; professor; politician

Luis Eduardo Montealegre (born October 14, 1957) is a Colombian lawyer, jurist, professor and politician who served as a Magistrate of the Constitutional Court from 2001 to 2004 and later Attorney General of Colombia from 2012 to 2016, being nominated by President Juan Manuel Santos. In 2025, he was nominated by President Gustavo Petro to serve as Minister of Justice and Law, succeeding Ángela María Buitrago.

Born in Ibague, Tolima, Montealegre graduated from the Externado University and later earned a postgraduate degree in law from the University of Bonn and a master's degree in criminal law from the University of Erlangen-Nuremberg.

Legal offices
Preceded by Antonio Barrera Carbonell	Magistrate of the Constitutional Court; 2001-2004	Succeeded by Humberto Sierra
Preceded by Viviane Morales	Attorney General of Colombia; 2012–2016	Succeeded by Néstor Humberto Martínez
Political offices
Preceded by Ángela María Buitrago	Minister of Justice and Law; 2025-2026	Incumbent
Order of precedence
Preceded by Germán Ávila as Minister of Finance and Public Credit	Order of precedence of Colombia as Minister of Justice and Law since June 13, 2025	Succeeded by Pedro Sánchez as Minister of National Defense
