= Government of Colombia =

- Constitution: Colombian Constitution of 1991
- Country: Colombia
- Website: www.gov.co

Executive
- Head of state: President of Colombia (Abelardo de la Espriella)
- Vice head of state: Vice President of Colombia (José Manuel Restrepo)
- Cabinet: Council of Ministers of Colombia

Legislative
- Legislature: Congress of Colombia: Senate of Colombia; Chamber of Representatives of Colombia
- Meeting place: National Capitol of Colombia

Judicial
- Court: Supreme Court of Justice of Colombia; Council of State (Colombia); Constitutional Court of Colombia; Superior Council of Judicature

The Government of Colombia is a unitary presidential republic with separation of powers into an executive, judicial, and legislative branch. The executive is led by the president, who acts as both the head of state and government, the judiciary includes four high courts which manage different fields of the law, and the national legislature is a bicameral congress composed of the senate and chamber of representatives.

The country is principally divided into 32 departments and one capital district.

The Economist Intelligence Unit rated Colombia a "flawed democracy" in 2024.

== Executive ==
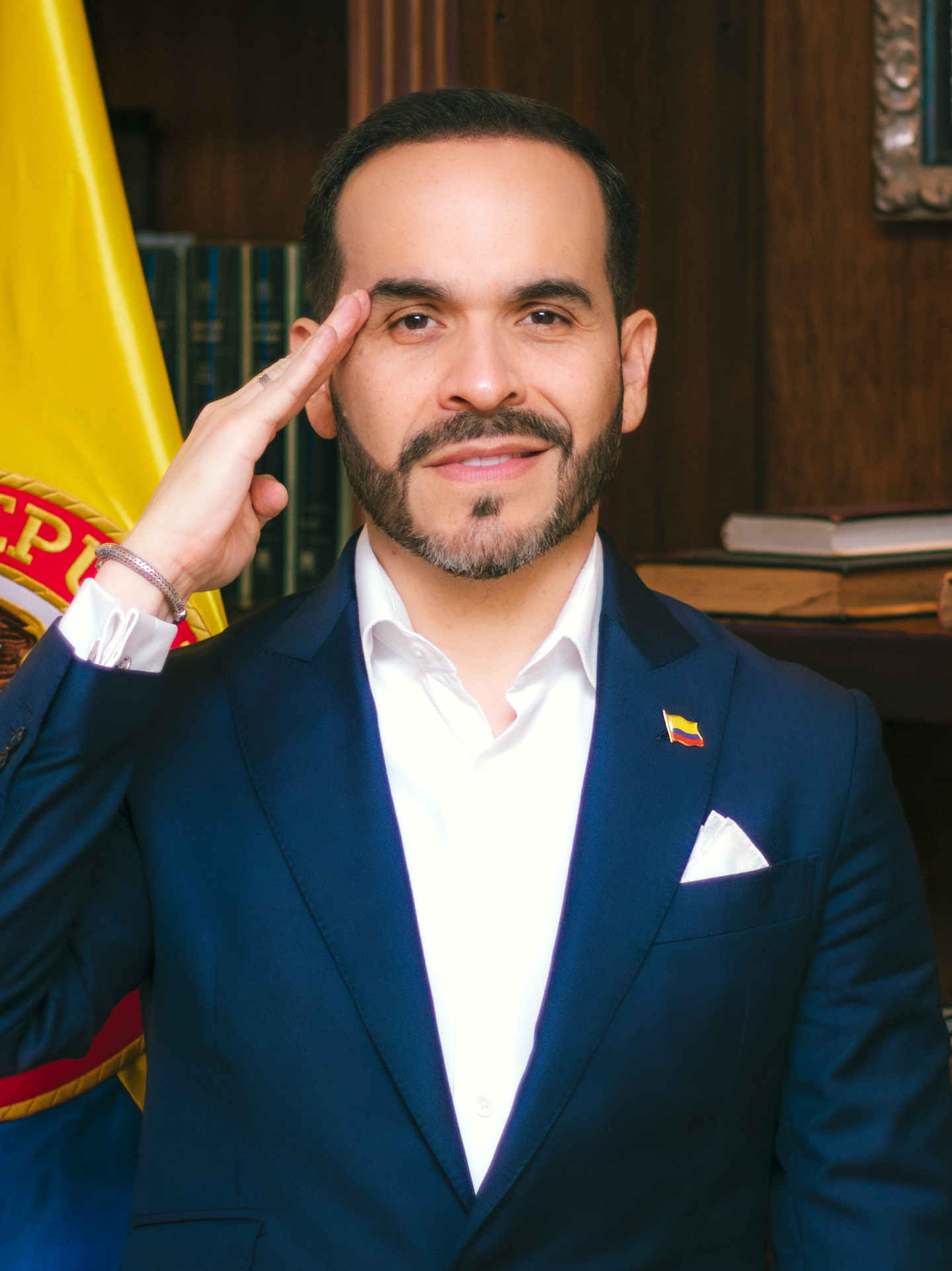
Abelardo de la Espriella
36th president

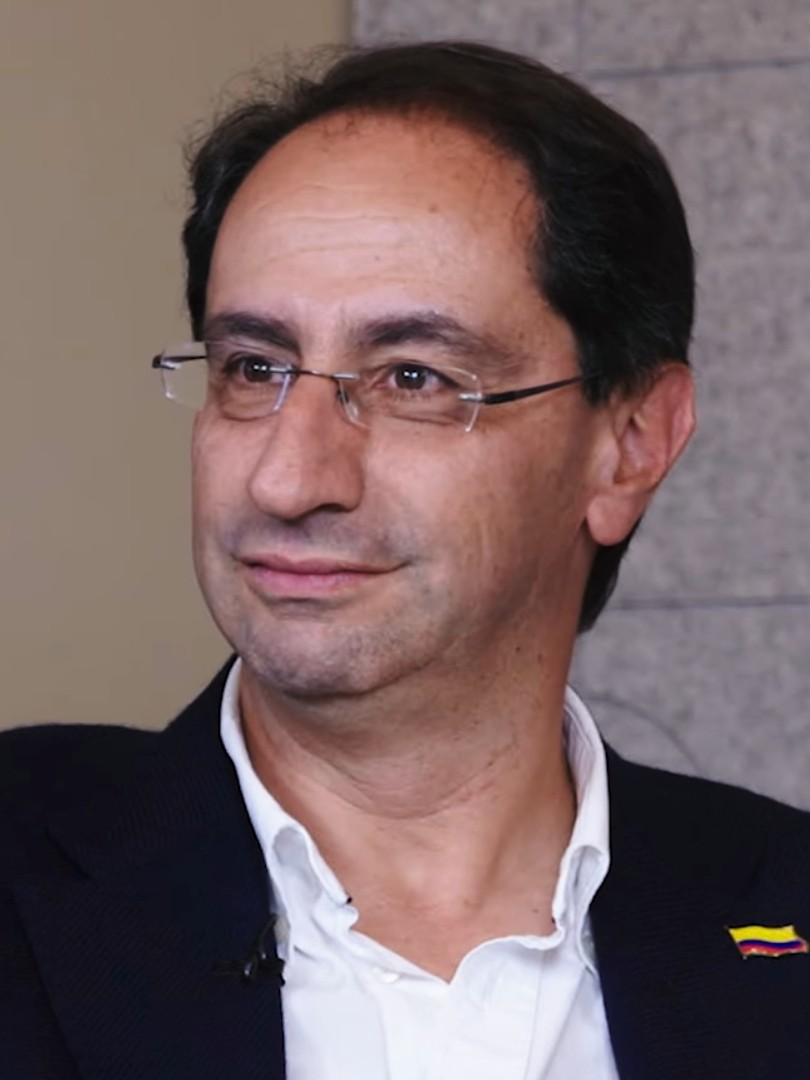
José Manuel Restrepo
14th vice president

=== President ===
The president of Colombia is elected by a direct popular vote, with elections held every four years. They are the head of state and government, as well as the commander-in-chief and supreme administrative authority. In 2015, Congress limited the presidency to a single four-year term, preventing the president from seeking re-election.

For 150 years, excluding military dictatorships in the 1950s, the president came from either the Liberal Party or the Conservative Party, with the country operating under a two-party system. But, every president following the 2002 election has come from a third party.

=== Vice President ===
The Vice President is the second-highest executive office in Colombia. They are elected directly by appearing on a presidential candidate's ticket. The 1991 constitution reestablished the office after being abolished in 1905.

=== Council of Ministers ===
The Council of Ministers is the national government cabinet of Colombia, composed of the most senior appointed politicians of the executive branch. In addition to the president and vice president, members are the heads of ministries and administrative departments. Its composition has changed throughout history, but the council currently includes 19 ministers and 6 directors of administrative departments, all appointed by the president.

== Legislature ==
The legislative branch of Colombia's national government is the bicameral Congress, composed of the Senate and Chamber of Representatives. Its primary duties are lawmaking and legislative regulation; these include drafting, enacting, interpreting, amending, and repealing laws.

=== Senate ===
The Senate of Colombia is composed of 108 seats, with members elected to 4-year terms in direct elections through a party-list proportional representation system. The Senate has 7 permanent commissions and a board of directors.

=== Chamber of Representatives ===
The Chamber of Representatives of Colombia is composed of 188 members elected to 4 year terms in direct elections through a party-list proportional representation system. One seat is dedicated to representing the Raizal ethnic group, two seats are dedicated to the Indigenous peoples in Colombia, and one is dedicated to Colombians abroad.

== Judiciary ==
The judiciary of Colombia interprets and applies the country's laws to ensure equal justice under the law and to provide a mechanism for dispute resolution. The judicial branch of Colombia's national government is composed of four high courts: the Supreme Court of Justice which takes on matters of criminal law, the Council of State which handles administrative law, the Constitutional Court dealing with constitutional law, and the Superior Council of Judicature which manages jurisdictional conflicts and judicial administration. Colombia’s legal system follows civil law.

=== Supreme Court of Justice of Colombia ===
The Supreme Court of Justice of Colombia handles criminal law, composed of 23 judges appointed to non-renewable 8-year terms by Congress from a list of candidates. Justices must be lawyers who have served a minimum of 10 years in the judiciary, the public ministry, or at an established educational institution and be natural-born Colombian citizens. The court was created in 1886 and is led by the President of the Supreme Court of Justice. Below the Supreme Court are Judicial District Superior Tribunals and, below them, district courts. Before the 1991 constitution, it was the highest legal, civil, criminal, and constitutional court in Colombia.

=== Council of State ===
The Council of State handles administrative law. It was established in 1817 by the first president of Colombia Simón Bolívar.

=== Constitutional Court ===
The Constitutional Court handles constitutional law and international treaties. It was established by the constitution of 1991, which reorganized the country's high courts.

=== Superior Council of Judicature ===
The Superior Council of Judicature handles jurisdictional conflicts and judicial administration; it is headed by a president. The council is composed of two chambers: the administrative chamber and the disciplinary jurisdictional chamber, made up of 6 and 7 judges, respectively. It is also the job of the superior council to submit lists of potential justices for the Supreme Court of Justice.

=== Special jurisdictions ===
Military tribunals handle infractions by police and active military personnel according to the Military Penal Code. The National Electoral Council is a legal body that has final say on electoral issues. Due to the ongoing Colombian conflict, special legal jurisdictions (the Special Jurisdiction for Peace and Judicial Chambers for Justice and Peace) have been created to try individuals for crimes committed during the conflict.

== Subdivisions ==
Colombia is principally divided into 32 departments and one capital district. There are four other cities (Cartagena, Barranquilla, Santa Marta, and Buenaventura) which also have district status due to their national importance but remain within a department.

=== Departments ===
Each department has a governor and department assembly and is granted limited autonomy. Departments are primarily composed of municipalities, of which there are 1123 in Colombia, each with a mayor and municipal council. Each department has its own department capital.

The most recent changes to departments were made in the 1991 constitution, which created the modern departments of Amazonas, Arauca, Casanare, Guainía, Guaviare, Putumayo, San Andrés y Providencia, Vapués, and Vichada that were previously a part of the "National Territory".

=== Capital District ===
The capital city of Bogotá has the same administrative status as a department. It is governed by the Superior Mayor of Bogotá and Bogotá City Council. The council is the supreme authority of the district, autonomous in administrative, budgetary, and financial matters. While Bogotá is outside of the Cundinamarca Department, it is the department's official capital.

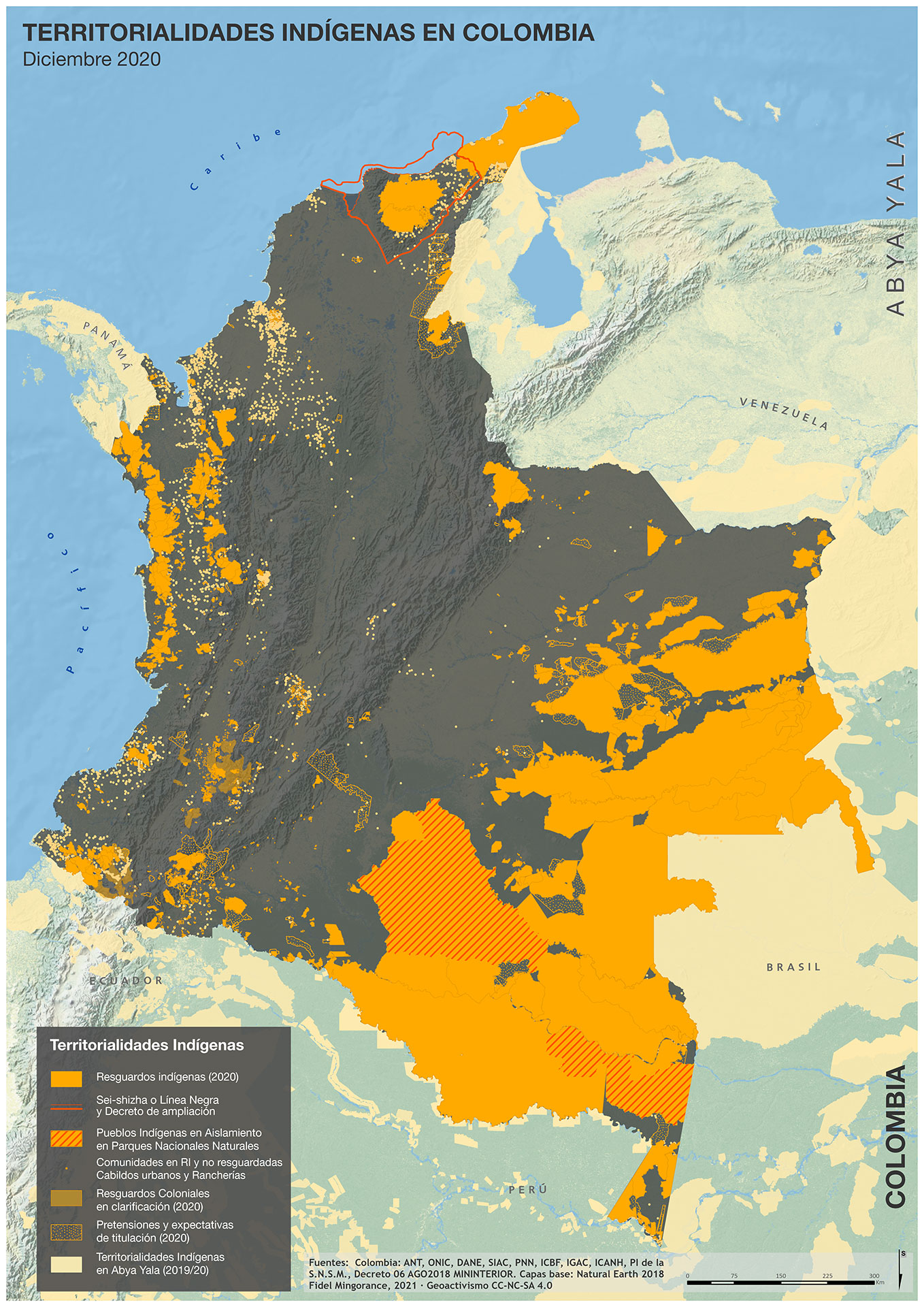
Indigenous territories (resguardo indigena) within Colombia, represented in orange

=== Indigenous territories ===
Indigenous territories or indigenous reserves in Colombia are the "constitutional form through which the state recognizes and formalizes the collective ownership of [indigenous] peoples' ancestral territories"; there are 846 territories recognized by law. The territories total 35,608,579.2 hectares or 31% of the nation as of 2023 according to the National Land Agency.

According to the 2018 census, 64% of Colombia's 1.9 million indigenous people lived within these territories.

The National Indigenous Territories Commission (CNTI) was established in 1996 by Decree 1397 to ensure full territorial rights for indigenous peoples. It is composed of 10 delegates representing indigenous organizations within the territories who consult with and relay issues to the national government.

== Issues ==
=== Trust ===
In 2022, 21% of Colombians reported high or moderately high trust in the national government, 22% in their local government, and 20% in the civil service.

=== Climate change ===
Colombia's government has been recognized as taking a determined approach to reducing its dependence on fossil fuels and contributing to a reversal in global climate change trends.

== See also ==
- Mass media in Colombia
- Politics of Colombia
- Government entities of Colombia
