= Fabiola Posada =

Colombian comedian (1963–2024)

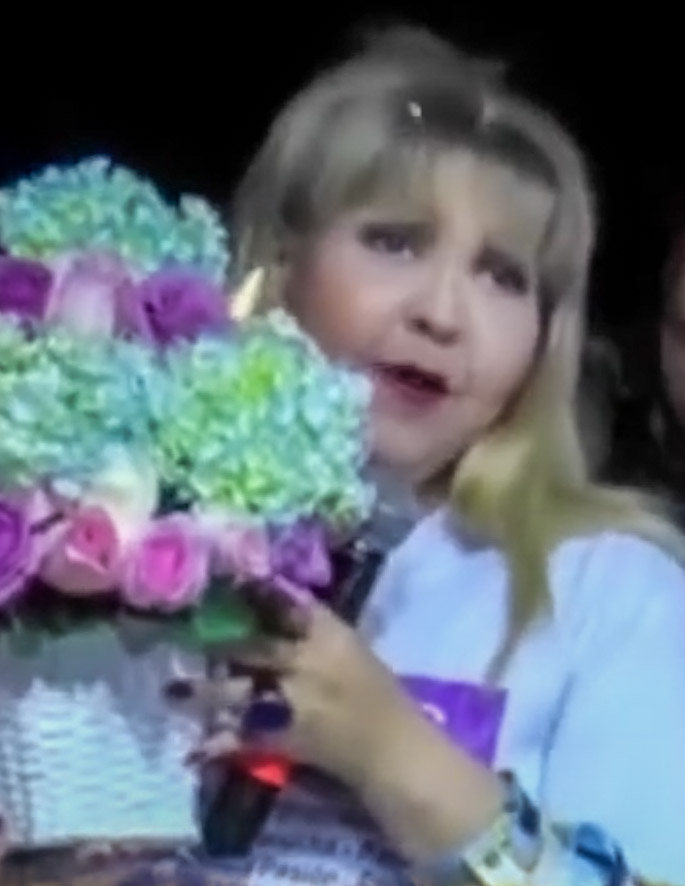
- Posada in 2018
- Born: Fabiola Emilia Posada Pinedo; September 18, 1963; Santa Marta, Colombia
- Died: September 19, 2024 (aged 61); Bogotá, Colombia
- Other names: La Gorda Fabiola, Gordita Fabiola
- Education: Universidad Externado de Colombia
- Occupations: Comedian, actress and social communicator.
- Political party: Partido Popular Colombiano
- Spouses: Mauricio Valencia (m. 1983; div. 1997); Nelson Polanía Garzón "Polilla" (m. 1997)
- Children: 3

Aedile of Suba
- In office 2001–2002

Bogotá City Council
- In office 2002–2005

Fabiola Emilia Posada Pinedo (September 18, 1963 – September 19, 2024) was a Colombian comedian and actress known artistically as La Gorda Fabiola.

== Biography ==
Fabiola Posada lived in Santa Marta until she was 16, when she decided to travel to Bogotá to study Social Communication at the Universidad Externado de Colombia.

=== Career as a social communicator ===
She practiced her profession as a social communicator in the Diario La República and in the revista Contigo. She also ventured into politics being concejal de Bogotá (2002–2005).

=== Career as a comedian ===
Her arrival in the world of humor was by chance, when an assistant of the program Sábados felices approached her on the street because he was looking for a fat girl to be part of a section of the program. It was on the program where she met her husband Nelson Polanía "Polilla" and thanks to him she won the affection of her native country. As a comedian she performed in places such as Buenos Aires, Santiago de Chile, Panamá, Caracas, Nueva York, Miami and Washington D. C. and performed several comedies for the theatre accompanied by her husband Nelson Polanía.

=== Illness and death ===
In 1997, at the age of 33, the comedian confirmed that she suffered from diabetes. On November 2, 2014, she suffered four heart attacks and underwent open-heart surgery. Days later, she returned to the intensive care unit due to bleeding in her digestive tract.

Posada died on the morning of September 19, 2024, at the age of 61, due to a heart attack and complications from a bacterium. According to reports, she had been hospitalized due to health problems since September 16. The director of the radio program La Luciérnaga, Gabriel De Las Casas, confirmed the news through his Twitter account.
