= Catholic University of Colombia =

Coordinates: 4°38′03″N 74°04′01″W

- Universidad Católica de Colombia
- Type: Private
- Established: March 1, 1970
- Rector: Francisco José Gómez Ortiz
- Students: 10,695
- Undergraduates: 8,893
- Postgraduates: 1,783
- Doctoral students: 19
- Location: Av. Caracas 46-72, Bogotá, Colombia
- Campus: Urban
- Website: www.ucatolica.edu.co

The Catholic University of Colombia is a private institution of higher education. It was founded in Bogotá, Colombia in 1970, notable in its early loyalty to Catholic church doctrine. The institution had more than ten thousand students in September 2019, of which the majority were undergraduates. The university has three campuses in the city of Bogota, a school, a language school, and a university campus in addition to being an office setting for students in Bogotá. It gives technical and technological careers (in Chia, a town near Bogota). The three most important sites are in Bogota, Chapinero, and Teusaquillo — characterized by their historical and cultural value. Its entire campus distributed in such sites totals about 77,000 m^{2} with 44,000 m^{2} of buildings and 33,000 m^{2} for building.

After 40 years, the Catholic University of Colombia is one of the most representative universities in the country and is known for its Catholic doctrine in much of Latin America.

== Undergraduate programs ==
The Universidad Catolica de Colombia offers eight undergraduate programs. It has approximately 11.000 students.

- Architecture
- Law
- Economy
- Civil engineering
- Industrial Engineering
- Systems Engineering
- Electronics and telecommunications engineering
- Psychology

== Specializations (graduate programs) ==
- Work Management
- Pavement Engineering
- Water Resources
- Financial Management
- Formulation and Evaluation
- Systems Audit
- Network Security
- Quality and Performance
- Clinical Psychology
- Legal Psychology
- Educational Psychology
- Organizational Psychology
- Probation Law
- Criminal Law and Forensic Science
- Tax and Customs
- Governance and Management of Regional and Municipal Development
- Labor and Social Security
- Criminal Investigation and Criminal Trial in the Adversarial System

== Masters ==
- Political Science (in partnership with University of Salerno)
- Psychology
- Industrial Engineering
