= Superior Council of Judicature =

Colombian institution part of the judicial branch

Superior Council of Judicature (Spanish: Consejo Superior de la Judicatura) is a Colombian institution part of the judicial branch of Colombia in charge of adopting a yearly report which is presented to the Congress of Colombia with a detailed report on justice handling in Colombia. The council also adopts the Development plan for the judicial branch of Colombia and presents it to the President of Colombia so that it be included in the Colombian National Plan of Development. The Superior Council of Judicature also establishes rules for an efficient administration of justice and can adopt and propose Law projects related to the administration of justice and procedure codes. Members of the council are entitled to elect the new president of the council. The court was established by the Constitution of 1991, alongside the Supreme Court of Justice, Council of State, and Constitutional Court of Colombia. The functions of the Superior Council of Judicature are stipulated in Article 79, Law 270 of 1996 in the Constitution of 1991.

== President of The Superior Council of Judicature ==
The President of the Superior Council of Judicature is in charge of leading the Superior Council of Judicature, and has the legal institutional representation of the other institutions in the judicial branch as well as for the common people. He is entitled to elect the Vice President of the Superior Council of Judicature.

The current president is Jorge Alonso Flechas Diaz and the vice president is Jesael Giraldo Castaño.
