= Office of the Attorney General of Colombia =

Colombian government agency

Coordinates: 4°38′20″N 74°5′58″W

Office of the Attorney General
- Fiscalía General de la Nación

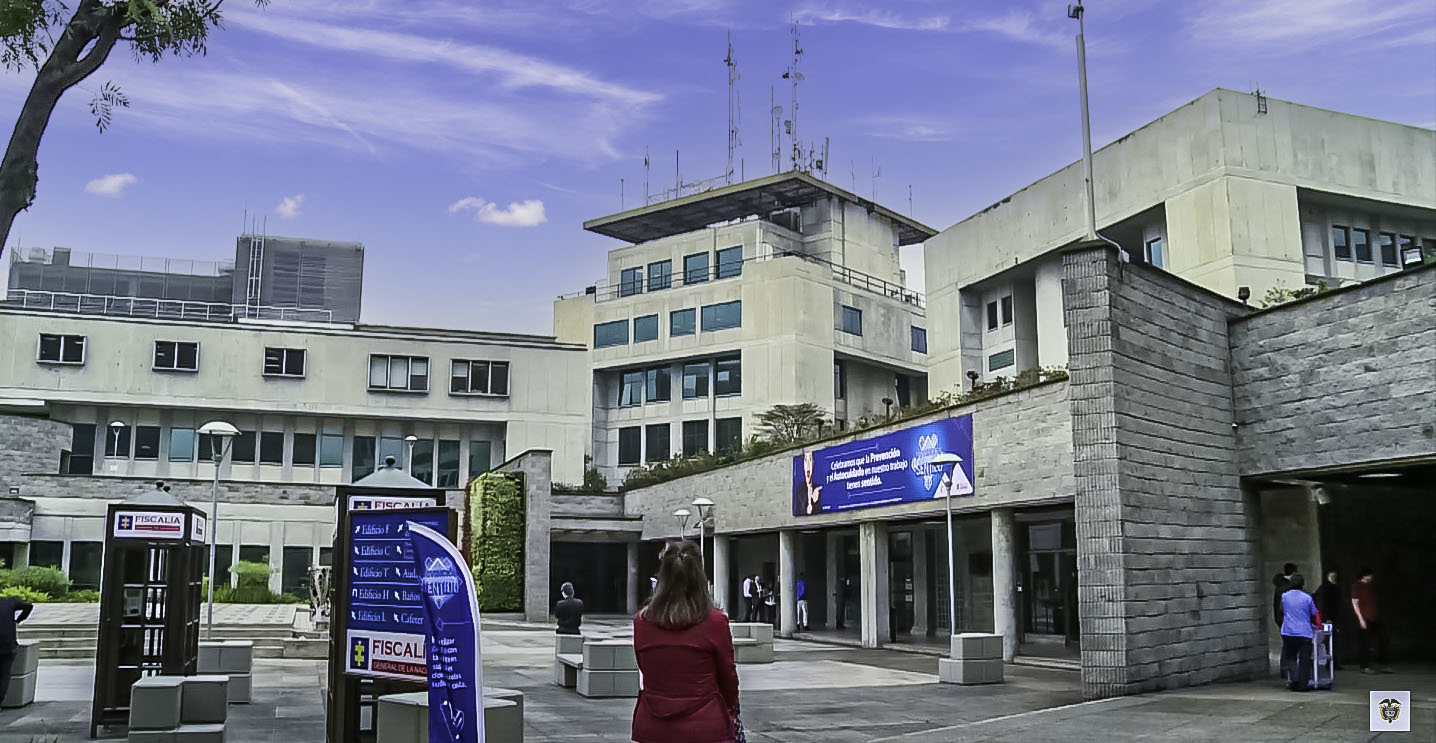

Agency overview
- Formed: July 6, 1991
- Headquarters: Diagonal 22B 52-01 (Ciudad Salitre), Bogotá, Colombia
- Annual budget: COP$1,437,526,644,588 (est. 2010)
- Agency executives: Luz Adriana Camargo, Attorney General; Gilberto Guerrero, Deputy Attorney General
- Child agency: National Institute of Legal Medicine and Forensic Sciences
- Website: www.fiscalia.gov.co

The Office of the Attorney General of Colombia (Spanish: Fiscalía General de la Nación; literally "General Prosecutorial Office of the Nation") is the Colombian institution part of the Colombian judicial branch of Government with administrative autonomy designed to prosecute offenders, investigate crimes, review judicial processes and accuse penal law infractions against judges and courts of justice. The Office of the Attorney General was created by the Colombian Constitution of 1991 and began operating on July 1, 1992.

An investigative process is initiated either by the institutions' own initiative or after a denouncer has made authorities aware of the case in a police station or in a Quick Reaction Unit of the Attorney General's Office.

== History ==
Former attorney general Luis Camilo Osorio, whose four-year term ran from 2001 to 2005, was criticized by Human Rights Watch. They accused him of undermining investigations into human rights violations by retiring or forcing the resignation of several investigators.

In November 2023, the Organized Crime and Corruption Reporting Project joined with more than 40 media partners including Cerosetenta / 070, Vorágine, the Centro Latinoamericano de Investigación Periodística (CLIP) and Distributed Denial of Secrets and journalists in 23 countries and territories for the largest investigative project on organized crime to originate in Latin America, producing the 'NarcoFiles' report. The investigation was based on more than seven million emails from the Colombian prosecutor's office which had been hacked by Guacamaya, including correspondence with embassies and authorities around the world. The files dated from 2001-2022 and included audio clips, PDFs, spreadsheets, and calendars. The investigation revealed new details about the global drug trade and over 44 tons of "controlled deliveries" carried out to infiltrate the drug trade and how criminals corrupt politicians, bankers, accountants, lawyers, law enforcement agents, hackers, logistics experts, and journalists in order to use logistical, financial, and digital infrastructures.
