= Council of State (Colombia) =

Council of State of Colombia
- Consejo de Estado de Colombia
- Established: 1817

The Council of State of Colombia (Spanish: Consejo de Estado de Colombia) is the supreme tribunal with jurisdiction over administrative issues in Colombia.

== History ==
Created in 1817 by Simón Bolívar, the Council of State of Colombia is the oldest judicial organ still in operation in Latin America. It was abolished in 1843 but reconstituted in 1886.

== Composition ==
The State Council comprises twenty-seven judges who serve a term of eight years. It appoints its own judges from lists submitted by the Superior Council of the Judiciary. There are five sections dealing with different specialized topics.

== Functions ==
Anyone may request the Council of State to rule on whether a given administrative action complies with the law and the Constitution. The Council may suspend any actions judged not to so comply. It also provides non-binding advice to Government, which is required to consult it on proposed measures within a defined scope.

The Council may: introduce bills relating to its functions; cancel the investiture of members of Congress in accordance with law; and make a ruling on the transit of foreign troops through the national territory.

== Interventions ==
=== Domain names ===
On December 11, 2001, the Council of State, through its Consultation and Civil Services Office, issued the first legal opinion concerning the domain name .co, establishing the status of that domain name as denoting the nation of Colombia.

=== US access to military bases ===
The Council of State was consulted in 2009 on a proposed agreement to permit increased use of Colombian bases by US military personnel. Despite criticism by the Council describing some aspects of the pact as "very broad and imbalanced", in October President Alvaro Uribe went ahead and signed the agreement.

=== Abortion guidelines ===
After abortion was partially legalized in Colombia in 2006, the Ministry of Health and Social Protection issued guidelines regulating abortion services. However, in 2009 the Council of State, ruling that the Ministry was not entitled to regulate abortion, suspended these guidelines, and in 2013 annulled them, leaving Colombia without official recommendations on abortion methods.

=== Unseating of Chief Prosecutor ===
In March 2012 the Council of State overruled the appointment as Chief Prosecutor of Viviane Morales, on the grounds that the process of electing her in the Supreme Court had been invalid.

=== Sale of Government stake in Isagen SA ===
In May 2015 the Council of State for a second time suspended the sale of the Government stake in the electricity company Isagen SA, in order to consider appeals against the sale.

== See also ==
- Council of state
- Government of Colombia
