= Viviane Morales =

Colombian politician and attorney (born 1962)

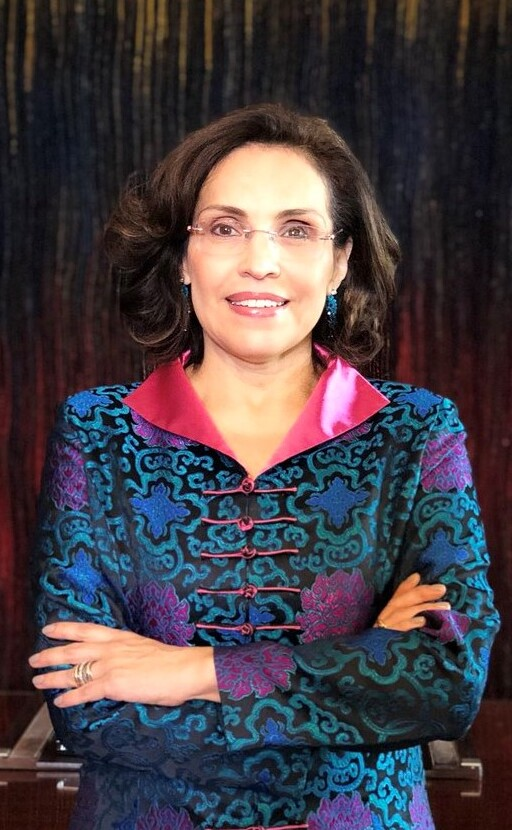
- Official portrait, 2018

Minister of National Education
- In office 7 August 2026 – 7 September 2026
- President: Abelardo de la Espriella
- Preceded by: Daniel Rojas Medellín
- Succeeded by: Ilva Miryam Hoyos

Ambassador of Colombia to France
- In office 12 November 2018 – 24 May 2021
- President: Iván Duque
- Preceded by: Federico Renjifo
- Succeeded by: Mauricio Vargas

6th Attorney General of Colombia
- In office 12 January 2011 – 6 March 2012
- Nominated by: Juan Manuel Santos
- Deputy: Wilson Alejandro Martínez (2011); Martha Lucía Zamora (2011–2012)
- Preceded by: Mario Iguarán
- Succeeded by: Luis Eduardo Montealegre

Senator of Colombia
- In office 20 July 2014 – 18 January 2018
- In office 20 July 1998 – 20 July 2002

Member of the Chamber of Representatives
- In office 1 December 1991 – 20 July 1998
- Constituency: Bogotá

Deputy Minister of Economic Development
- In office 1 September 1989 – 31 October 1989
- Minister: María Mercedes Cuéllar
- Preceded by: Federico Renjifo Vélez
- Succeeded by: Fernando Panessa Serna

Secretary General of the Ministry of Economic Development
- In office 1 January 1988 – 7 August 1990
- Minister: Miguel Merino Gordillo; Carlos Arturo Marulanda; María Mercedes Cuellar
- Preceded by: Alfonso Campo Soto
- Succeeded by: Carlos Alberto Garay

Personal details
- Born: Viviane Aleyda Morales Hoyos; 17 March 1962 (age 64) Bogotá, D.C., Colombia
- Party: Defenders of the Homeland (since 2025)
- Other political affiliations: Christian Union (1991–1998); Front of Hope (1998–2002); Liberal Party (2002–2018); Somos Región Colombia (2018); Independent (2018–2025)
- Spouse(s): Luis Alfonso Gutiérrez (m. 1987; div. 2000) Carlos Alonso Lucio (m. 2000; div. 2008) (m. 2011; div. 2020)
- Children: 3
- Education: Our Lady of the Rosary University; Paris-Panthéon-Assas University
- Occupation: Lawyer • Professor • Politician

Viviane Aleyda Morales Hoyos (born 17 March 1962) is a Colombian politician who currently serves as the Minister of National Education since August 2026. She was the 6th Attorney General of Colombia and the first woman to hold that post. She was elected by the Supreme Court of Justice out of a list of three candidates presented by President Juan Manuel Santos Calderón that also included Juan Carlos Esguerra Portocarrero and Carlos Gustavo Arrieta Padilla. On 2 March 2012, she resigned days after her election as Attorney General was invalidated by the Council of State due to irregularities in her election. Her resignation was accepted on 5 March 2012 by the Supreme Court. She was a member of the Colombian Senate from 2014 until 2018.

She is well known in Colombia as being one of the opposing figures of the same sex marriage, and in particular the adoption of kids by same sex couples, owing to her Christian faith. Morales is a popular figure among Pentecostals and other Protestant Christians in Colombia, as they make up 70-80% of her voter base.

Morales was a presidential candidate for the 2018 Colombian presidential election, but she ended her campaign in favour of Iván Duque.

She was the ambassador of Colombia to France under president Iván Duque from November 2018 to May 2021.

In 2026, Morales was appointed as education minister by president Abelardo de la Espriella, but resigned less than a month later due to personal reasons.
