= Constitutional Court of Colombia =

Supreme constitutional court of Colombia

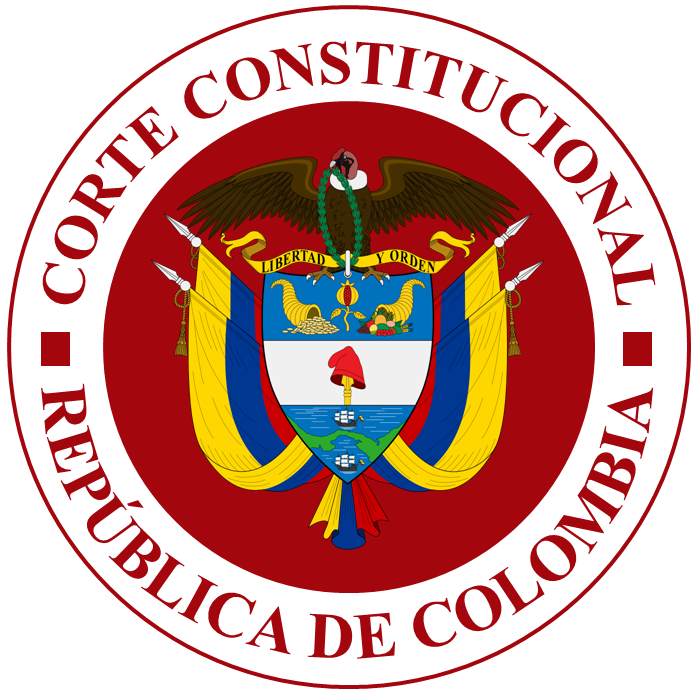
- Seal of the Constitutional Court
- Interactive map of Constitutional Court of Colombia
- 04°35′56.4″N 74°04′31.8″W
- Established: 1991
- Jurisdiction: Colombia
- Location: Bogotá
- Coordinates: 04°35′56.4″N 74°04′31.8″W
- Composition method: Nominated by the President, the Council of State, or the Supreme Court, elected by the Senate.
- Authorised by: Constitution of Colombia
- Judge term length: 8 years (non-renewable)
- Number of positions: 9, by statute
- Website: www.corteconstitucional.gov.co/english/

President of the Constitutional Court
- Currently: José Fernando Reyes Cuartas
- Since: 10 February 2024

Vice President of the Constitutional Court
- Currently: Jorge Enrique Ibañez Najar
- Since: 10 February 2024

The Constitutional Court of Colombia (Spanish: Corte Constitucional de Colombia) is the supreme constitutional court of Colombia. Part of the Judiciary, it is the final appellate court for matters involving interpretation of the Constitution with the power to determine the constitutionality of laws, acts, and statutes.

The court was established by the Constitution of 1991, alongside the Supreme Court of Justice, Council of State, and Superior Council of Judicature. Its first session began in March 1992. The court is housed within the shared judicial complex of the Palace of Justice located on the north side of Plaza de Bolívar in the La Candelaria neighborhood of Bogotá.

The Constitutional Court consists of nine magistrates who are elected by the Senate of Colombia from ternary lists drawn up by the President, the Supreme Court of Justice, and the Council of State. The magistrates serve for a term of eight years. The court is headed by a President and Deputy President.

== Composition ==
The Constitutional Court consists of nine judges who are elected by the Senate from ternary lists drawn up by the President, the Supreme Court of Justice, and the Council of State. Must be citizens by birth, a lawyer, without any criminal sentences except for political or negligent crimes, and have held a legal position, practiced law, or taught law at an officially recognized university for fifteen years, as modified by Legislative Act 2 of 2015. The court is headed by a President and Deputy President.

=== Current justices ===
- Jorge Enrique Ibañez Najar (President)
- Paola Andrea Meneses Mosquera (Deputy President)
- Miguel Enrique Polo Rosero
- Cristina Pardo Schlesinger
- Diana Constanza Fajardo Rivera
- José Fernando Reyes Cuartas
- Natalia Ángel Cabo
- Juan Carlos Cortés González
- Vladimir Fernández Andrade
