= Universidad Externado de Colombia =

Colombian university

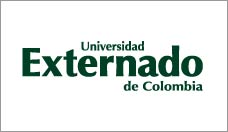
- Motto: Post tenebras spero lucem
- Type: Private
- Established: 15 February 1886
- Founder: Nicolás Pinzón Warlosten
- Rector: Hernando Parra Nieto
- Students: 12,500
- Location: Calle 12 No. 1-17 Este., Bogotá, Colombia; 4.595803°N 74.068360°W
- Website: http://www.uexternado.edu.co

The Universidad Externado de Colombia (Externado University of Colombia) is a private university in Bogotá, Colombia. It has produced graduates including lawyers, academics, judges, financiers, journalists, as well as senior government officials and politicians. The institution grants 4 and 5-year professional degrees, as well as advanced Master and Doctoral degrees. Instruction is primarily in Spanish. In 2023, it had more than 13,000 students.

As well as being a member of the Unión de Universidades de América Latina, UDUAL, and the Asociación Internacional de Universidades, AIU., it is a founding member of the Asociación Colombiana de Universidades, ASCUN.

In 2005, UNESCO established a chair in Human Rights, Violence, Public Policies and Governance, at the university.

== History ==
It was founded on the 15 February 1886, by jurist and educator Nicolás Pinzón Warlosten, in answer to the educational restrictions imposed during "La Regeneración" which was a period when conservatives managed the government. It gained full university status in 1958. Nicolás Pinzón Warlosten, who obtained help and aid from professors from the radical liberalism movement, and intellectuals from the body-social, formed an educational institution.

University rankings

Global – Overall
- QS World: 951-1000 (2026)

== Admissions ==
Its admission requirements are the Colombian bachiller (secondary school certificate) and the Examen de Estado (the State Exams). Furthermore, the SAT and/or ACT are recognized for American students wanting to transfer to the Universidad Externado.

== Academics ==
Programmes offered are:

- Business Management
- Tourism and Hotel Management
- Educational Sciences
- Social Sciences (Anthropology, Sociology, Psychology, Philosophy, Social Work, Geography and History)
- Journalism
- Public Accounting
- Law
- Economics
- Cultural Heritage Studies (Museology, Archaeology and Restoration)
- Finance and International Relations
- Government and International Relations
- Sociology
- Anthropology
- Social Work
- Geography
- Psychology
- Philosophy
- History

== Notable alumni ==
- Gustavo Petro, current president of Colombia
- Rodrigo Lara, lawyer and Minister of Justice
- Daniel Coronell, journalist
- Claudia López Hernández, mayor of Bogotá
- Jaime Giraldo Ángel, attorney and psychologist
- Fabiola Posada, comedian and actress

== Accreditation of High Quality Education ==
The Universidad Externado de Colombia obtained from the National Council of Accreditation of Colombia the accreditation of high quality for the university for eight years, the second highest available, as well as for programs such as: Law, Finance and International Relations, Government and International Relations, Accounting, Journalism, Economy, and Business Administration.
