= Supreme Court of Justice of Colombia =

Highest judicial authority in Colombia

- Corte Suprema de Justicia de Colombia
- Seal of Supreme Court of Justice
- Interactive map of Supreme Court of Justice of Colombia
- 04°35′56.4″N 74°04′31.8″W
- Established: 1886
- Jurisdiction: Colombia
- Location: Bogotá
- Coordinates: 04°35′56.4″N 74°04′31.8″W
- Composition method: Nominated by the Superior Council of the Judiciary, elected by the Supreme Court of Justice.
- Authorised by: Constitution of Colombia
- Judge term length: non-renewable 8 years
- Number of positions: 23, by statute
- Website: www.cortesuprema.gov.co

President of the Supreme Court of Justice
- Currently: Iván Mauricio Lenis Gómez
- Since: 22 January 2026

Vice President of the Supreme Court of Justice
- Currently: Aroldo Wilson Quiroz Monsalvo
- Since: 21 January 2021

The Supreme Court of Justice of Colombia (Spanish: Corte Suprema de Justicia de Colombia) in Bogotá is the highest judicial body in civil and penal matters and issues of criminal and civil procedure in Colombia.

The court consists of twenty three judges, elected by the court itself from a list prepared by the National Disciplinary Commission, replacing the former role of the Superior Council of the Judiciary, according to Legislative Act 2 of 2015, for individual terms of eight years. The court meets at the Palace of Justice in the Bolívar Square of Bogotá.

== History ==
After the Colombian first declaration of independence from Spain on 20 July 1810, a number of independent States like Tunja (1811), Antioquia (1812), Cartagena de Indias (1812) and Cundinamarca (1812) were established. Each State had its own body in charge of the administration of justice. Later, when these States established the Provincias Unidas de la Nueva Granada (United Provinces of New Granada), on 23 September 1814, the Alto Tribunal de Justicia (High Tribunal of Justice) was established. In 1819, the Republic of Colombia (the Gran Colombia) was born. A Court was created according to the provisions its Constitution of 30 August 1821, named Alta Corte de Justicia (High Court of Justice). In 1830, the Gran Colombia was dissolved and the Republic of New Granada was formed. As per the provisions of its Constitution of 29 February 1832, the Corte Suprema de Justicia (Supreme Court of Justice) was established. On 20 May 1853, it became the Corte Suprema de la Nación (Supreme Court of the Nation). In 1858, the Grenadine Confederation was founded. On adoption of its Constitution of 22 May 1858, the Courte Suprema (Supreme Court) became the body in charge of the administration of justice. In 1863, the Grenadine Confederation was replaced by the Estados Unidos de Colombia (United States of Colombia). On adoption of its Constitution of 8 May 1863, the Corte Suprema Federal (Supreme Federal Court) was established. Finally, after the establishment of the República de Colombia (Republic of Colombia) and on adoption of its Constitution of 4 August 1886, the body was renamed as the present, the Corte Suprema de Justicia (Supreme Court of Justice) on 3 September 1886. Its first President was Rito Antonio Martínez.

In 1985 in the Palace of Justice siege, members of the M-19 guerrilla group took over the Palace of Justice, and held the Supreme Court hostage, intending to put President Belisario Betancur on trial. Hours later, after a military raid, the incident left all the rebels and 11 of the 25 Supreme Court Justices dead.

== Current Judges ==
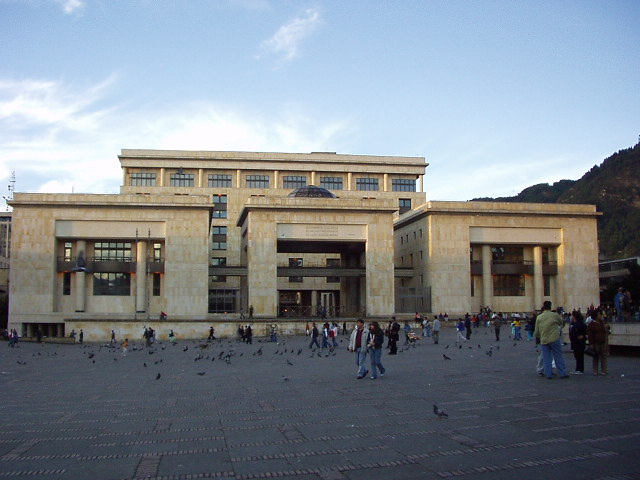
Palace of Justice

- President: Luis Antonio Hernández Barbosa
- Vice-president: Aroldo Wilson Quiroz Monsalvo

=== Civil and Agrarian Cassation Chamber ===
- President: Luis Armando Tolosa Villabona
- Hilda González Neira
- Aroldo Wilson Quiroz Monsalvo
- Francisco Ternera Barrios
- Álvaro Fernando García Restrepo
- Luis Alonso Rico Puerta
- Octavio Augusto Tejeiro Duque

=== Labor Cassation Chamber ===
- President: Fernando Castillo Cadena
- Jorge Mauricio Burgos
- Rigoberto Echeverri Bueno
- Clara Cecilia Dueñas Quevedo
- Luis Gabriel Miranda Buelvas
- Jorge Luis Quiroz
- Gerardo Botero Zuluaga

=== Penal Cassation Chamber ===
- President: Luis Antonio Hernández Barbosa
- Eyder Patiño Cabrera
- Luis Guillermo Salazar Otero
- Fernando Alberto Castro Caballero
- Gustavo Malo Fernández
- Patricia Salazar Cuéllar
- José Francisco Acuña Vizcaya
- José Luis Barceló Camacho
- Eugenio Fernández Carlier
