= Luis Felipe Henao Cardona =

Colombian politician (born 1979)

Minister of Housing, City and Territory of Colombia
- In office 4 June 2013 – 7 August 2018
- President: Juan Manuel Santos Calderón
- Preceded by: Germán Vargas Lleras

Personal details
- Born: 23 October 1979 (age 46) Medellín, Antioquia, Colombia
- Spouse: Luz Stella Murgas Maya (-present)
- Education: Our Lady of the Rosary University (LLB, 2001); University of Salamanca (PhDc)
- Profession: Lawyer

Luis Felipe Henao Cardona (born 23 October 1979) is a Colombian politician who was Minister of Housing, City and Territory of Colombia since 2013.

== Career ==
In 1997, Henao enrolled at Our Lady of the Rosary University, where majored in Law, graduating in 2001. He returned to his alma mater in 2002 to pursue a specialization in Business Law. He is a PhD Candidate in Criminal law at the University of Salamanca.

In 2002, Henao joined the legal firm, Jaime Lombana Villalba & Abogados, as an Associate Attorney, where he practised until 2006. In January 2003 he is hired by Our Lady of the Rosary University as a Full Professor of criminal law, a post that he held until 2013.

In 2006, Henao began his incursion into politics when he was appointed General Secretary of the then-Ministry of Environment, Housing and Territorial Development, at the time under the leadership of Minister Juan Lozano Ramírez during the Administration of President Álvaro Uribe Vélez. Henao was later promoted by President Uribe and appointed Deputy Minister for Housing and Territorial Development on 11 September 2007.

In 2012, Henao returned to the Housing portfolio when President Santos transferred Minister Vargas from the Ministry of the Interior to the Ministry of Housing, City and Territory, and at the insistence of Vargas President Santos also transferred Henao and appointed him Deputy Minister of Housing on 17 May 2012.

On 22 May 2013, President Santos announced the designation of Henao as the new Minister of Housing, City and Territory to replace Minister Vargas, who would be leaving to manage the Santos re-election campaign in preparation for the 2014 Colombian presidential elections. Henao was sworn in on 4 June 2013 thus succeeding Vargas as the 3rd Minister of Housing, City and Territory of Colombia.

== Personal life ==
Luis Felipe was born on 23 October 1979 in Medellín, Colombia; his father is Rubén Darío Henao Orozco, a lawyer and former Magistrate of the Supreme Judicial Council. He is married to Luz Stella Murgas Maya with whom he has a son born in 2010.

== Selected works ==
- Henao Cardona, Luis Felipe (November 2004). "¿El Derecho Penal Puede y Debe Transformar Radicalmente sus Contenidos de Protección?". Estudios Socio-Jurídicos (in Spanish). 6 (2). Bogotá: Our Lady of the Rosary University: 501–533. ISSN 0124-0579. OCLC 820318900.
- Balmaceda Hoyos, Gustavo; Henao Cardona, Luis Felipe (2005). Sociedad del Riesgo y Bien Jurídico Penal (in Spanish). Santiago: Editorial Aremis. ISBN 9789568217044. OCLC 67347504.
- Bernate Ochoa, Francisco; Forero Ramírez, Juan Carlos; Galeano Rey, Juan Pablo; Heano Cardona, Luis Felipe; et al. (March 2005). "Los Principios del Proceso Penal En El Proyecto de Nuevo Código Procesal Penal Colombiano". Sistema Penal Acusatorio. Biblioteca Jurídica Diké (in Spanish). Bogotá: Our Lady of the Rosary University. pp. 35–56. ISBN 9789588225401. OCLC 318367790.
- Henao Cardona, Luis Felipe; Balmaceda Hoyos, Gustavo (2006). Introducción al Derecho Penal de la Sociedad Postindustrial. Biblioteca Jurídica Diké (in Spanish). Medellín: Our Lady of the Rosary University. ISBN 9789588235530. OCLC 143902215.
