= Colombia–Trinidad and Tobago relations =

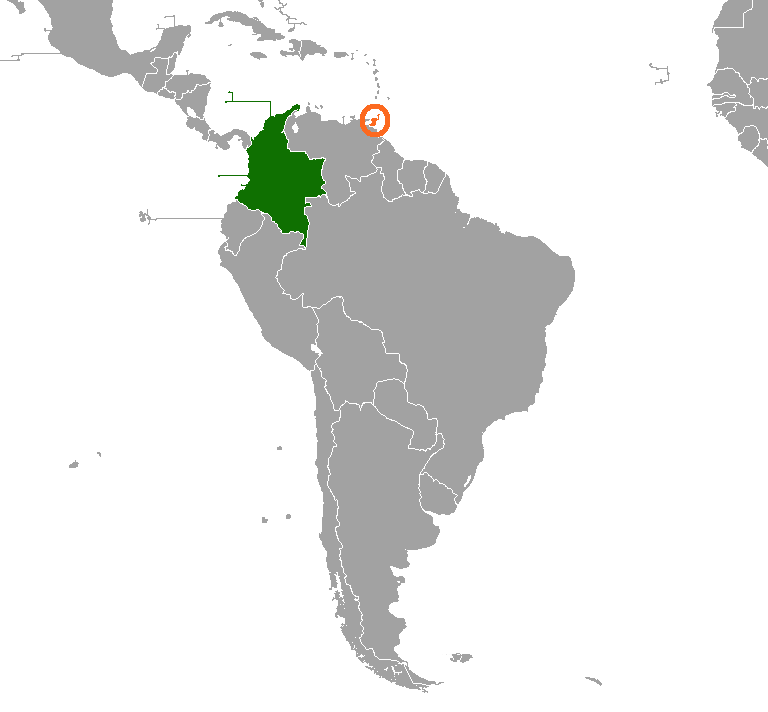

- Colombia: Trinidad and Tobago

Diplomatic mission
- Embassy of Colombia in Port of Spain: Embassy of Trinidad and Tobago in Caracas

Colombia–Trinidad and Tobago relations are the bilateral relations between the Republic of Colombia and the Republic of Trinidad and Tobago. Both countries are members of Organization of American States and the Community of Latin American and Caribbean States.

== History ==
Both nations established diplomatic relations on 22 February 1968. The Colombian embassy in Trinidad and Tobago was opened in January 2012. In that year, Colombia showed willingness to expand its diplomatic ties with Trinidad and Tobago, with programmes including national security, border security, policing, investment, trade, defence cooperation, enhance direct flights to Bogotá, medical tourism, agricultural exchanges, sporting, cultural as well as language education. In 2014, the Colombian-Trinidadian Chamber of Commerce was created to strengthen trade relations. On 24 January 2017, a bilateral meeting was held with María Ángela Holguín and Dennis Moses at Punta Cana, Dominican Republic. One month later, Trinidadian Ambassador Paul Byam accredited to the former president of Colombia Juan Manuel Santos as representative of the government of Trinidad and Tobago.

On 4 September 2018, Colombian Deputy Minister of Foreign Affairs Luz Stella Jara held a meeting with the Minister of Trade and Industry of Trinidad and Tobago Paul Gopee-Scoon in Bogotá to discuss the bilateral trade that focuses on trade and investment. One year later on 15 May 2019, the Foreign Minister of Colombia Carlos Holmes Trujillo held a bilateral meeting with his Trinidadian counterpart Dennis Moses in Port of Spain. They had a discussion about the problems on the bilateral and regional agenda. On 17 July 2023, Minister of Foreign and CARICOM Affairs Amery Browne met with the Ambassador of the Republic of Colombia William Bush. Amery Browne recognised the collaboration between Colombia and Trinidad and Tobago in the agriculture field.

== High-level visits ==
High-level visits from Colombia to Trinidad and Tobago

- Vice President Angelino Garzón (2012)

== Bilateral agreements ==
Both nations have signed several bilateral agreements such as an Agreement through Exchange of Notes on the Abolition of Visa Requirements (1973); Framework Agreement for Technical and Scientific Cooperation between the Government of Trinidad and Tobago and the Government of the Republic of Colombia (1995); Agreement on Bilateral Police Cooperation (2006) and a Memorandum of Understanding on Political Consultations (2023).

== Trade ==
Colombia exported products worth 308,040 thousand dollars, the main export products being petroleum, machinery and agro-industrial products, while Colombia exported products worth 119,178 thousand dollars, the main products being chemicals, petroleum derivatives and agro-industrial products.

In 2022, Colombia exported $67.4M to Trinidad and Tobago. The products exported from Colombia to Trinidad and Tobago included raw sugar ($8.82M), aluminium cans ($7.34M), and electric batteries ($5.5M). Trinidad and Tobago exported $222M to Colombia. The products exported from Trinidad and Tobago to Colombia consisted of nitrogenous fertilisers ($83.9M), crude petroleum ($68.6M), and ammonia ($35.1M).

== Diplomatic missions ==
- Colombia has an embassy in Port of Spain, as well as a consular section in the same embassy.
- Trinidad and Tobago's embassy in Caracas is accredited to Colombia, and has a consulate in Bogotá.

== See also ==
- Foreign relations of Colombia
- Foreign relations of Trinidad and Tobago
