= Public utilities in Colombia =

Public utilities in Colombia are operated by private companies and regulated by the government.

== Government policy ==
At the end of the 1980s, public services in Colombia were of low quality; the charges made to consumers were determined politically and were insufficient to finance the operation of those services. Furthermore, the cost structures were highly inefficient. This situation was created by a deficient legal framework and the monopolistic role played by the state since the beginning of the twentieth century.

The constitution of 1991 gave the private initiative a major role in providing public utilities and allowed the government to regulate the sector. The government made improving the provision of public utilities to the vulnerable sectors of society a key goal. These general objectives became the responsibility of the Public Utilities Regime, which provides for increasing coverage, promoting privatization of utilities, developing a tariff regime, and giving consumers a supervisory role. The regime created three regulatory commissions (for electricity, telecommunications, and water and sanitation) and an organization for the promotion, supervision, and control of competition called the Residential Public Services Superintendency (SSPD).

As a result of the reforms, which naturally generated resistance in certain sectors of society, particularly among union workers, the provision of all services has improved significantly. For example, between 1990 and 2003 electricity coverage increased from 80 to 95 percent of the population; drinking water, from 67 to 87 percent; sewerage, from 50 to 72 percent; and local telephone service, from 8 to 22 percent. Natural gas service began in the mid-1990s, and coverage increased from 20 percent in 1997 to 35 percent of the population in 2003. One possible explanation for the comparatively low coverage in natural gas is that expanding its rural availability is very expensive. The quality of ancillary services has risen, and today it is possible to pay most public-utility charges by phone or Internet.

Throughout the process, rates for most public utilities, including drinking water and electricity, have gone up in real terms. This increase in charges has meant lower dependency on public funds to cover the cost of supplying these services. It also has meant that consumption has fallen as a result of the higher prices, delaying the need for further investments in order to increase installed capacities of different services. Some rates also have gone down, as in the case of waste collection for multiple users (for example, buildings or housing complexes), and of international phone calls.

Despite these improvements, there is a need for much more progress in improving the regulatory framework, fostering competition, reducing production costs, and allowing consumers to benefit more from some of these efficiency gains.

== Electricity ==
Before 1990 public monopolies provided electric service. As a result of significant expansion of electricity-generation capacity between 1970 and 1990—financed mostly by foreign loans—and the inefficiencies in the provision of this service, by 1990 about one-third of the nation's public foreign debt was associated with the electricity sector. The debt originated not only from mismanagement but also from the cost of replacing the electric-power infrastructure sabotaged by the guerrillas. In 1992, as a result of severe drought, Colombia resorted to electricity rationing.

The reforms of the 1990s broke down this monopolistic structure by encouraging the participation of private enterprise in the generation, transmission, and distribution of energy and by creating the Energy and Gas Regulatory Commission (Comisión de Regulación de Energía y Gas, or CREG). CREG has regulated natural monopoly stages, such as transmission and distribution, through price caps, while competition has played an increasing role in generation and commercialization. Interconnection with Andean and Central American countries is being considered as a means of improving competition and providing better protection against future rationing in the region.

== Potable water and sewerage ==
In 2000 the Potable Water and Basic Sanitation Regulatory Commission (Cra) formalized the requirements for public and private companies to provide drinking water and sewerage. The main objectives were to promote competition and new investments while increasing transparency and reducing regulatory risk.

As private companies—foreign and national—have taken over water supply services in various Colombian cities, charges have increased, and the financial deficit in the provision of drinking water has been reduced from 45 to 10 percent. As prices have increased, consumption has decreased by at least 13 cubic meters a month per household to 16.9 cubic meters a month per household in 2004. This reduced consumption in response to higher prices has generated efficiency gains by lowering expansion requirements and variable costs. Increased efficiency also has brought about a smaller workforce and reduced the number of employees for every 1,000 subscribers in major cities. For example, between 1995 and 2000, the number of employees per 1,000 subscribers dropped from 6.8 to 3.7 in Barranquilla, and from 3.2 to 2.3 in Bogotá.

== Waste collection ==
Bogotá began transferring responsibility for waste disposal to private firms even before the existence, since 1994, of the SSPD. Since then private participation in waste disposal has increased. The SSPD has more than 500 waste-collection firms registered, about 20 percent of which are private. Approximately 80 percent of the users of waste-disposal services regarded the service as good. Public campaigns and economic incentives exist to increase public awareness of the need for recycling, and some progress has been made, but there is still a long way to go in promoting its environmental benefits.

== See also ==
- Economy of Colombia
- Superintendency of Residential Public Services (Colombia)
- Potable Water and Basic Sanitation Regulation Commission
