= Germán Vargas Lleras =

Vice President of Colombia from 2014 to 2017

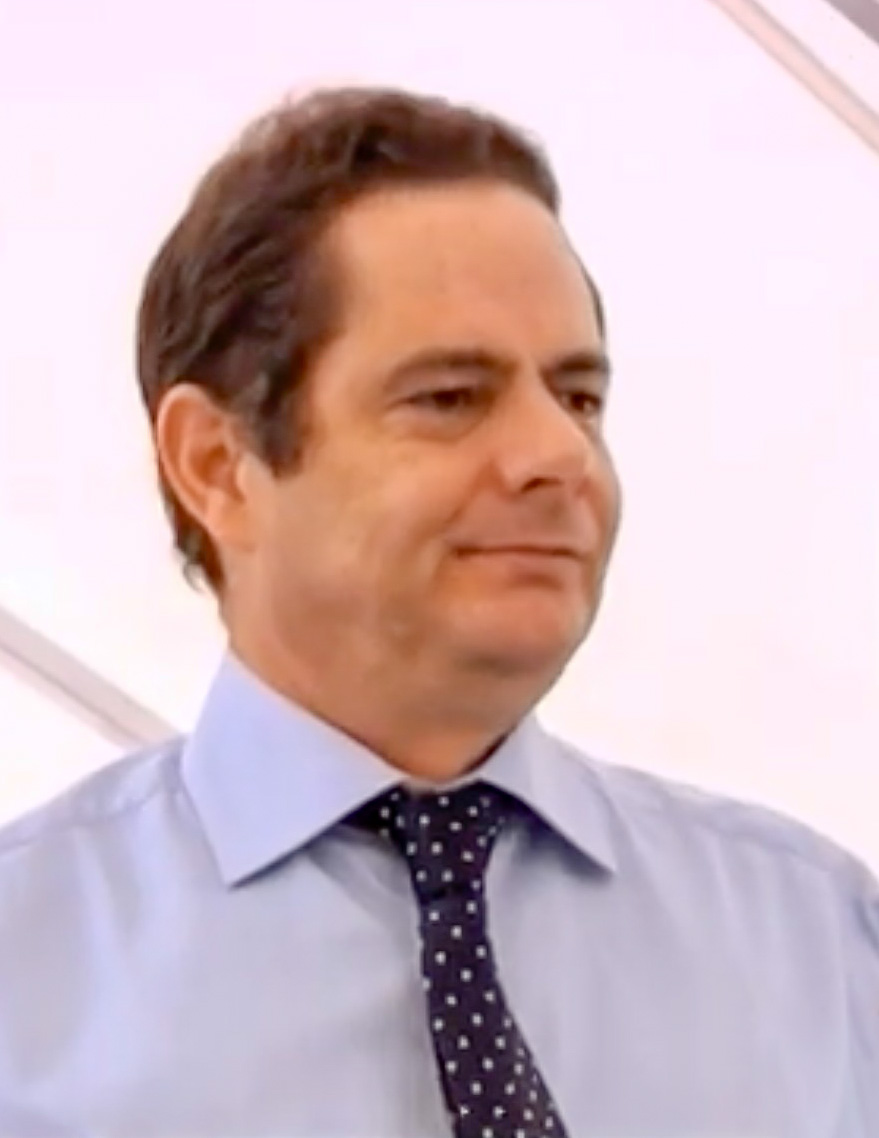
- Vargas Lleras in 2012

10th Vice President of Colombia
- In office 7 August 2014 – 21 March 2017
- President: Juan Manuel Santos
- Preceded by: Angelino Garzón
- Succeeded by: Óscar Naranjo Trujillo

Minister of Housing, City and Territory
- In office 17 May 2012 – 5 June 2013
- President: Juan Manuel Santos
- Preceded by: Beatriz Elena Uribe Botero
- Succeeded by: Luis Felipe Henao Cardona

Minister of the Interior
- In office 11 August 2011 – 17 May 2012
- President: Juan Manuel Santos
- Preceded by: Fernando Londoño
- Succeeded by: Federico Renjifo Vélez

Minister of the Interior and Justice
- In office 7 August 2010 – 11 August 2011
- President: Juan Manuel Santos
- Preceded by: Fabio Valencia Cossio
- Succeeded by: Position abolished (Note: Juan Carlos Esguerra Minister of Justice and Law)

President of the Senate
- In office 20 July 2003 – 20 July 2004
- Preceded by: Luis Alfredo Ramos
- Succeeded by: Luis Humberto Gómez Gallo

Senator of Colombia
- In office 20 July 1994 – 3 August 2008

Personal details
- Born: Germán Vargas Lleras; 19 February 1962 Bogotá, D.C., Colombia
- Died: 8 May 2026 (aged 64) Bogotá, D.C., Colombia
- Party: Liberal (1994-2002); Colombia Always (2002–2006); Radical Change (2006–2026)
- Spouses: María Beatriz Umaña (m. 1996; div. 2000); Luz María Zapata (m. 2010; div. 2023)
- Children: 1
- Relatives: Carlos Lleras Restrepo (grand-father); Cecilia de la Fuente de Lleras (grand-mother)
- Education: Del Rosario University; Complutense University
- Website: Official website

Military service
- Allegiance: Colombia
- Branch/service: Colombian Army
- Years of service: 1980-1986
- Rank: Lieutenant

Germán Vargas Lleras (Note: Spanish pronunciation: [xeɾˈmam ˈbaɾɣas ˈʝeɾas]) (19 February 1962 – 8 May 2026) was a Colombian politician who served as 10th vice president of Colombia under president Juan Manuel Santos from 2014 to 2017.

Born in Bogotá, D.C., and raised in Bojacá, Vargas Lleras attended the Universidad del Rosario, where he earned a law degree. He began his political career as a Senator from 1994 to 2008, and later served as President of the Senate of Colombia from 2003 to 2004. He was appointed Minister of the Interior and Justice, and subsequently Minister of the Interior, during the presidency of Juan Manuel Santos.

In 2014, President Santos chose him as his running mate for the 2014 presidential elections. They defeated their opponents from the Democratic Center party: Finance Minister Óscar Iván Zuluaga and Interior Minister Carlos Holmes Trujillo. In 2017, he resigned to run for president in the 2018 presidential elections, in which he finished fourth.

== Background ==
Germán Vargas Lleras was born in Bogotá on 19 February 1962, to Germán Vargas Espinosa and Clemencia Lleras de la Fuente. His mother is the daughter of former president Carlos Lleras Restrepo.

He graduated from Universidad del Rosario in Bogotá where he received his Bachelor of Laws degree. Afterwards he went to Spain to study Government and Political Science at the Ortega and Gasset Institute of the Complutense University of Madrid.

Vargas Lleras died in Bogotá on 8 May 2026, at the age of 64. He was being treated for brain cancer for several years, receiving treatment in Colombia and the United States before his death.

== Political career ==
Vargas Lleras began his political career while in college at 19 years of age in a campaign that got him elected as councilman of Bojacá, Cundinamarca, in 1981 under the flags of the New Liberalism, a dissident political movement founded by the then young Senator Luis Carlos Galán. Right after the election, Galan appointed him political coordinator for the district of Los Mártires in the capital city of Bogotá. The experience he acquired during his tenure led him to run for city councilman of Bogotá in 1988. After the assassination of Galán in 1989, the New Liberalism began to crumble, and Vargas Lleras, who was then private secretary at the Ministry of Agriculture, joined the ranks of the Colombian Liberal Party.

In 1999 Vargas Lleras became the head of the opposition in the Senate to the government of president Andrés Pastrana, mainly due to the 1999–2002 FARC–Government peace process. His opposition to ongoing peace talks brought him nearer to Álvaro Uribe Vélez, who was calling for the end of the Demilitarized Zone of San Vicente del Caguán.

In 2002 he ran for his third term of office in the Senate with the political movement Colombia Always. Five months into his third term, Vargas Lleras was the victim of a terrorist attack, in which he lost some fingers in his left hand. In 2003, Vargas Lleras was elected Senate President.

Vargas Lleras is mentioned in the Panama Papers scandal.

=== Parapolitics scandal ===
Cambio Radical, Vargas Lleras' party, was implicated in a so-called "parapolitics" scandal when there were allegations of ties between the paramilitary group AUC and politicians.

In 2012, the "parapolitics" scandal was reported on again when Inspector General Alejandro Ordoñez announced that there would be an investigation into the alleged ties between Vargas and jailed warlord Martin Llanos.

=== 2010 presidential elections ===
Vargas Lleras launched his presidential bid on June 25, 2009. During the event, he stated that he would stay on the race regardless of whether incumbent president Uribe would run for a third term. The election was won by Uribe's chosen successor, Juan Manuel Santos Calderón. Vargas won 10% of the vote and placed third, and later became a minister in Santos' coalition in August 2010.

=== 2018 presidential elections ===
German Vargas Lleras launched his presidential bid on August 29, 2017. This launch of the campaign surprised many politicians because he didn't use his political party to run (Radical Change) but instead started to collect signatures from citizens all around Colombia, a mechanism permitted under the constitution that was nonetheless criticized by some opponents. One of the strategies that the campaign used was messaging that invited Colombians to reflect on the situation of neighbouring Venezuela and how electing him could help avoid a similar outcome. Opinion columnist Jorge Eduardo Espinosa suggested that running by signature collection may have also served to distance Vargas Lleras's candidacy from corruption allegations involving members of his party, including members of parliament and attorneys.

Vargas Lleras began his campaign with a favorable image of 41% against an unfavorable image of 48% according to Gallup poll on August 30, 2017. He finished the race in fourth place with 7.30% of the votes.

In 2019, 65% of the population surveyed said they had an unfavourable image of Germán Vargas Lleras, while 25% said they had a favourable image.

== Death and funeral ==
Vargas Lleras died at his home in Bogotá, on the night of May 8, 2026, at the age of 64. He had been receiving home medical care due to experiencing complications related to cancer and neurosurgery.

Former presidents, Ernesto Samper, Álvaro Uribe, Juan Manuel Santos and Iván Duque, as well as former vice president Marta Lucía Ramírez issued his own statement in tribute to Vargas Lleras. President Gustavo Petro and Vice President Francia Márquez both expressed their condolences for the death of Vargas Lleras. Two days of national mourning were declared for the death of Vargas Lleras.

The remains of Vargas Lleras lay in state at the San Carlos Palace on May 9. His coffin was removed on the morning of May 11 by members of the 37th Infantry Presidential Guard Battalion, who transported it to the Primatial Cathedral of Bogotá, where his funeral was held.

Among the family members present were his daughter Clemencia and his brother. Vice President Francia Márquez was also in attendance. Former presidents César Gaviria, Ernesto Samper, Álvaro Uribe, and Iván Duque were in attendance. Former vice presidents Óscar Naranjo Trujillo and Marta Lucía Ramírez also attended the service.

== Notes ==
Political offices
Preceded by Angelino Garzón	Vice President of Colombia; 2014–2017	Succeeded by Óscar Naranjo Trujillo
Preceded by Beatriz Elena Uribe Botero	Minister of Housing, City and Territory; 2012–2013	Succeeded by Luis Felipe Henao Cardona
New office	Minister of the Interior; 2011–2012	Succeeded by Federico Renjifo Vélez
Preceded by Fabio Valencia Cossio	Minister of the Interior and Justice; 2010–2011	Succeeded by Himself as Minister of the Interior
Preceded by Fabio Valencia Cossio	Minister of the Interior and Justice; 2010–2011	Succeeded by Juan Carlos Esguerra Portocarrero as Minister of Justice
Preceded by Luis Alfredo Ramos	President of the Senate; 2003-2004	Succeeded by Luis Humberto Gómez Gallo
Party political offices
Preceded by Juan Manuel Santos	Party of the U nominee for President of Colombia; 2018	Succeeded by Federico Gutiérrez
Order of precedence
Preceded by Angelino Garzón as former vice president	Order of precedence of Colombia former vice president	Succeeded by Óscar Naranjo Trujillo as former vice president
