= Marta Lucía Ramírez =

Vice President of Colombia from 2018 to 2022

Her Excellency Marta Lucía Ramírez
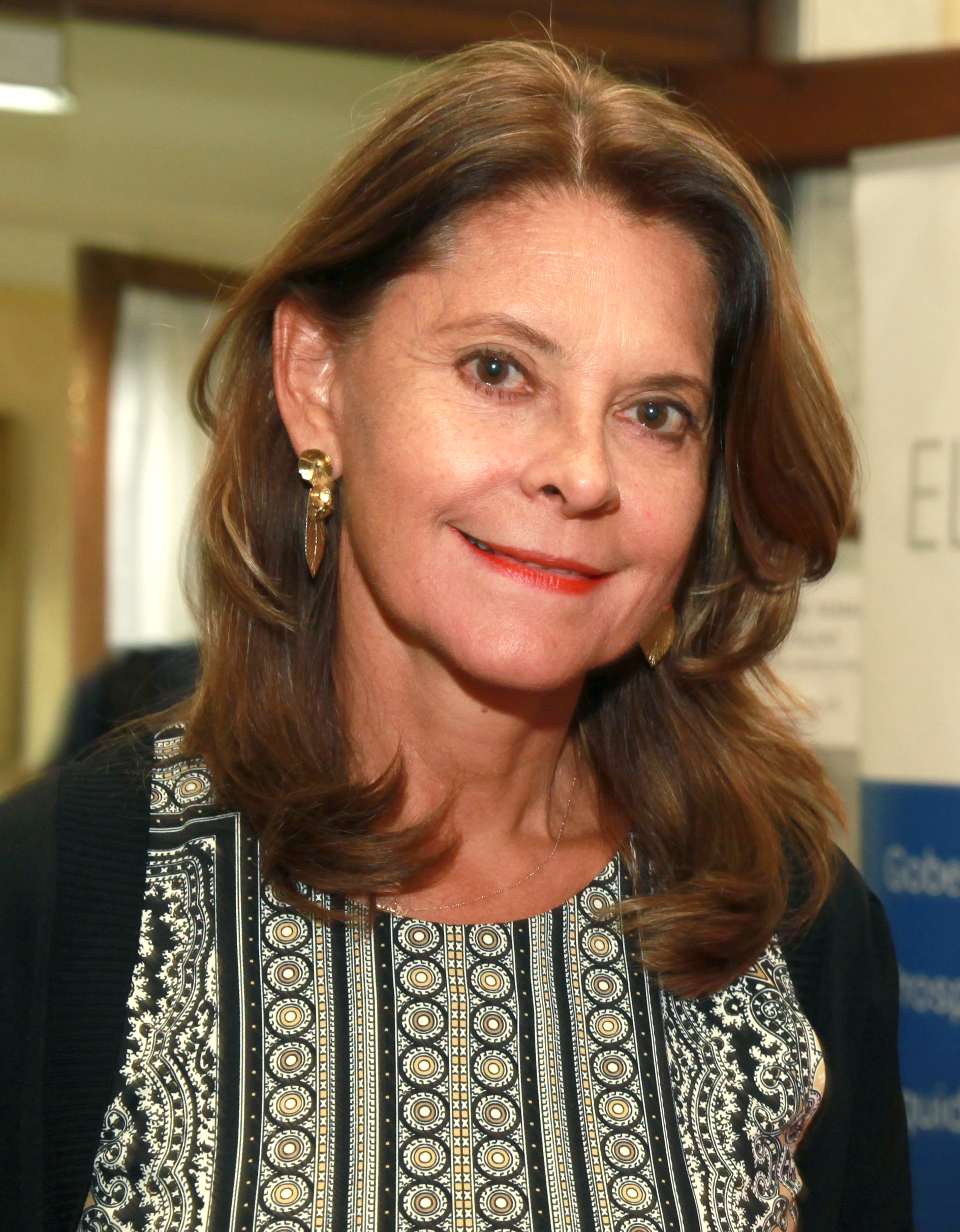
- Ramírez in 2022

12th Vice President of Colombia
- In office 7 August 2018 – 7 August 2022
- President: Iván Duque
- Preceded by: Óscar Naranjo
- Succeeded by: Francia Márquez

Minister of Foreign Affairs
- In office 19 May 2021 – 7 August 2022
- President: Iván Duque
- Preceded by: Claudia Blum
- Succeeded by: Álvaro Leyva

Senator of Colombia
- In office 20 July 2006 – 18 February 2009

Minister of National Defence
- In office 7 August 2002 – 9 November 2003
- President: Álvaro Uribe
- Preceded by: Gustavo Bell
- Succeeded by: Jorge Alberto Uribe

Ambassador of Colombia to France
- In office 1 February 2002 – 25 July 2002
- President: Andrés Pastrana
- Preceded by: Juan Camilo Restrepo
- Succeeded by: Miguel Gómez Martínez

Minister of Foreign Trade
- In office 7 August 1998 – 1 February 2002
- President: Andrés Pastrana
- Preceded by: Carlos Ronderos Torres
- Succeeded by: Ángela María Orozco

Deputy Minister of Foreign Trade
- In office 14 November 1991 – 12 February 1993
- President: César Gaviria
- Minister: Juan Manuel Santos
- Preceded by: Position established
- Succeeded by: Juan José Echavarría

Personal details
- Born: Marta Lucía Ramírez Blanco; 4 July 1954 (age 72) Zipaquirá, Cundinamarca, Colombia
- Party: Democratic Center (2018–present)
- Other political affiliations: Union Party for the People (2006–2009); Conservative (2009–2018)
- Spouse: Álvaro Rincón (m. 1984)
- Children: María Alejandra Rincón Ramírez
- Education: Pontifical Xavierian University (LLB, 1975); Center for International Affairs (Fellow, 1996–1997)
- Profession: Lawyer
- Website: Website

Marta Lucía Ramírez Blanco (born 4 July 1954) is a Colombian lawyer and politician who served as 12th Vice President of Colombia from 2018 to 2022. She also served as the Minister of Foreign Affairs of Colombia. In 2018, Ramírez became the first woman elected to serve as Vice President of Colombia, running on a ticket with Iván Duque. In 2021, after the resignation of her predecessor Claudia Blum, she was pronounced chancellor by the president Iván Duque.

Elected Senator of Colombia in 2006, Ramírez introduced legislative initiatives to permit women to attain the rank of General in the Military Forces of Colombia, and to mandate English teaching in schools. Ramírez was Colombia's first female Minister of National Defence, serving from 2002 to 2003 in the administration of President Álvaro Uribe, and the second woman in Latin America to hold this title. She has also served as the 6th Minister of Foreign Trade of Colombia, from 1998 to 2002.

In 2009 she resigned from the Senate to run as a candidate for the 2010 Conservative Party's presidential nomination, finishing third to the eventual Conservative nominee Noemí Sanín. In 2014, she once again ran for the Conservative nomination, this time winning the nomination, but ultimately finishing third in the first round of the 2014 presidential election. Ramirez is also a member of Washington, D.C.–based think tank, the Inter-American Dialogue.

== Personal life ==
Ramírez was born on 4 July 1954 in Zipaquira, Cundinamarca, Colombia to Álvaro Ramírez Suárez and Alba Blanco Venturoli, the eldest and only daughter of their four children. In 1974 she married Álvaro Rincón, a Colombian architect; together they have one daughter, María Alejandra. She is of Italian descent through her mother, and thorough her father, she is related to Jesús Ramírez Suárez, her uncle, who served as Chamber Representative for Cundinamarca.

A lawyer from the Pontifical Xavierian University, she holds a specialization degree in Legal Sciences and Socioeconomics, and postgraduate specialisations in Financial Law from the University of the Andes, and in Business Management from La Sabana's INALDE Business School. In 1996 she received a fellowship from Harvard University's Center for International Affairs, focusing on the internationalisation of the Colombian economy in the context of the rise of regional blocs and economic and commercial integration.

== Career ==
=== Minister of foreign trade ===
In 1997 Ramirez returned to Colombia as Noemi Sanin's campaign manager who ran for office in 1998. When Sanin lost the race, the new president Andres Pastrana appointed Ramirez as minister of foreign trade from 1998 until 2002. During this period she was rated as the best minister of Pastrana's cabinet in several polls. Her most important achievements were the design and implementation of a 10-year Strategic Plan for exports, competitiveness and entrepreneurship policy for Colombia. At the end of Pastrana's administration, Ramirez was appointed as Colombian ambassador to France. Only four months later, Alvaro Uribe was elected president and appointed Ramirez to become his defence minister.

=== Ambassador of Colombia in France ===
In 2002 Ramírez was then appointed as ambassador of Colombia in France for a few months. With the election of Álvaro Uribe as President of Colombia, Ramírez went back to Colombia.

=== Minister of national defence ===
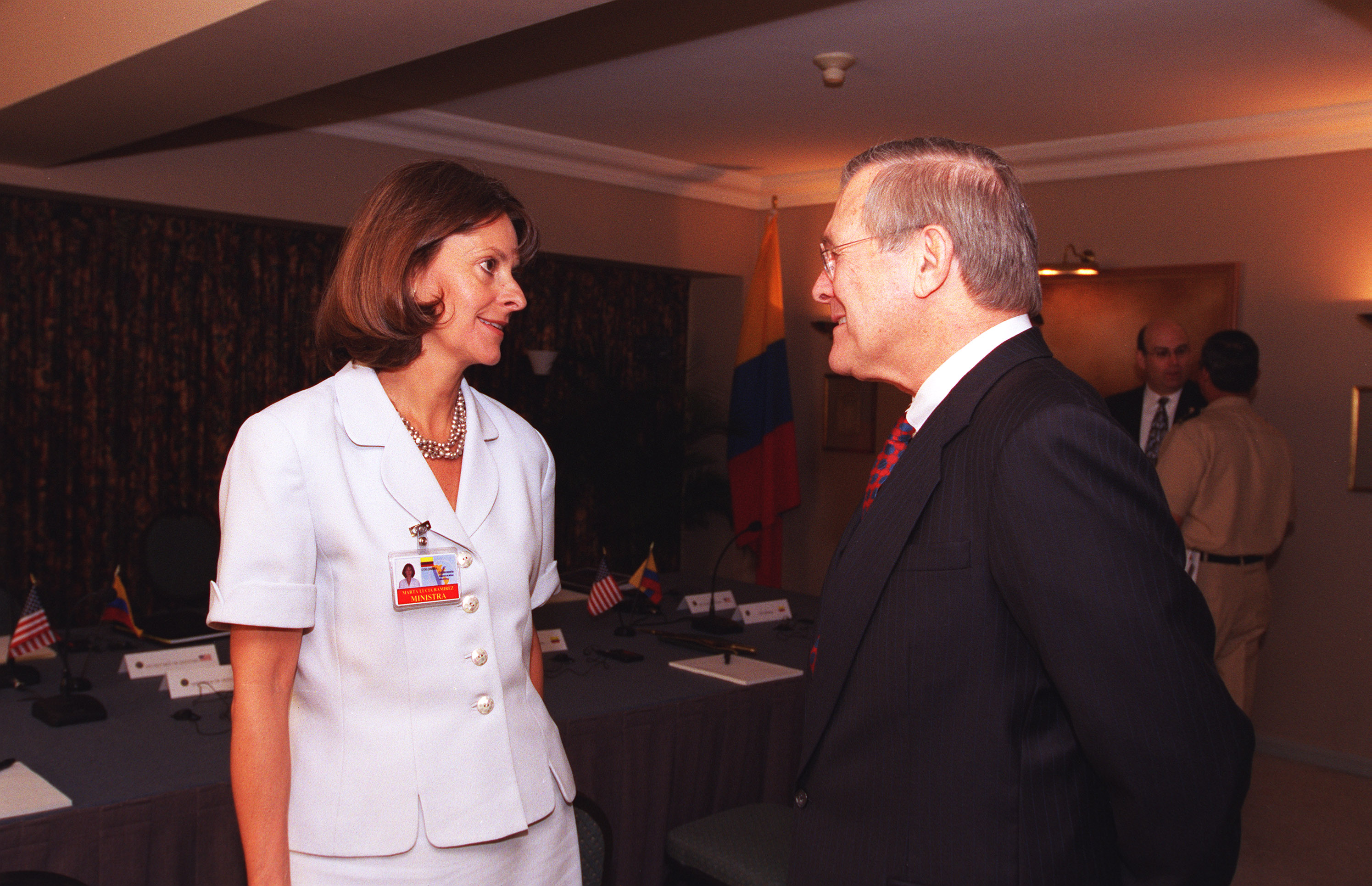
Minister Ramírez speaking with her counterpart, United States Secretary of Defense Donald Rumsfeld during a defence summit in Santiago, Chile in 2002.

Marta Lucia Ramirez was the 20th minister of national defence, the second woman in Latin America to hold this title after Michelle Bachelet, who later became President of Chile. Ramirez served as defence minister from 2002 until 2003. Her most significant contributions to Alvaro Uribe's government were the design and implementation of a 10-year Democratic Security Policy and her focus on civilian control over the military in order to maintain efficiency and legitimacy of the military forces in the war against the Colombian guerrillas, paramilitaries and narcotrafickers. During her term in the Defence Ministry, she designed and implemented the massive demobilisation program for guerrilla members, which focuses on young guerrillas to combat the FARC's recruitment of child soldiers. Under the leadership of President Uribe, she also implemented the security of Colombian roads through a program called “Live Colombia travel through it”, and designed a program focused on transparency and efficiency in the military procurement. She also initiates a group of civilian advisors to implement a reform in the Colombian Police, in order to complement the military fight against terrorism in urban locations. After serving as the Ministry of Defence, Ramirez became a private consultant in trade and security. She then became advisor for the World Trade Organisation where she was appointed chairwoman for the panel of experts at the Airbus-Boeing Trade panel. She resigned to run for the Colombian Senate in 2006 where she was elected with a high majority of opinion votes in the U Party, a new political party organised under Uribe's government.

=== Senator of Colombia ===
Elected as president of the International Affairs and Defence Commission in the Colombian Senate. As a senator she authored Law 1253/08 law for Colombian competitiveness; 1286/09 law for Science Technology and Innovation; 1190/09 law in favor of displaced people and different bills for public Universities, women protection, bilingual education and also presented political control debates to the executive branch. Due to her critics because of clientelism and corruption within the party, she organized dissidence with Gina Parody and Nicolas Uribe. Later Ramirez was against a third election of Alvaro Uribe as a Colombian president so she decided to resign from the party and the Congress. In 2010 she participated as a candidate for the Colombian presidency within the conservative party to which she still belongs.

In 2016 she and Nigeria Renteria Lozano were appointed as peace negotiators with the Revolutionary Armed Forces of Colombia (FARC). Various organisations had asked the director of UN Women and a Deputy Secretary-General of the United Nations to intercede to get women appointed. The war with FARC had lasted 50 years at that point and consumed 600,000 lives.

=== Vice presidency (2018–2022) ===
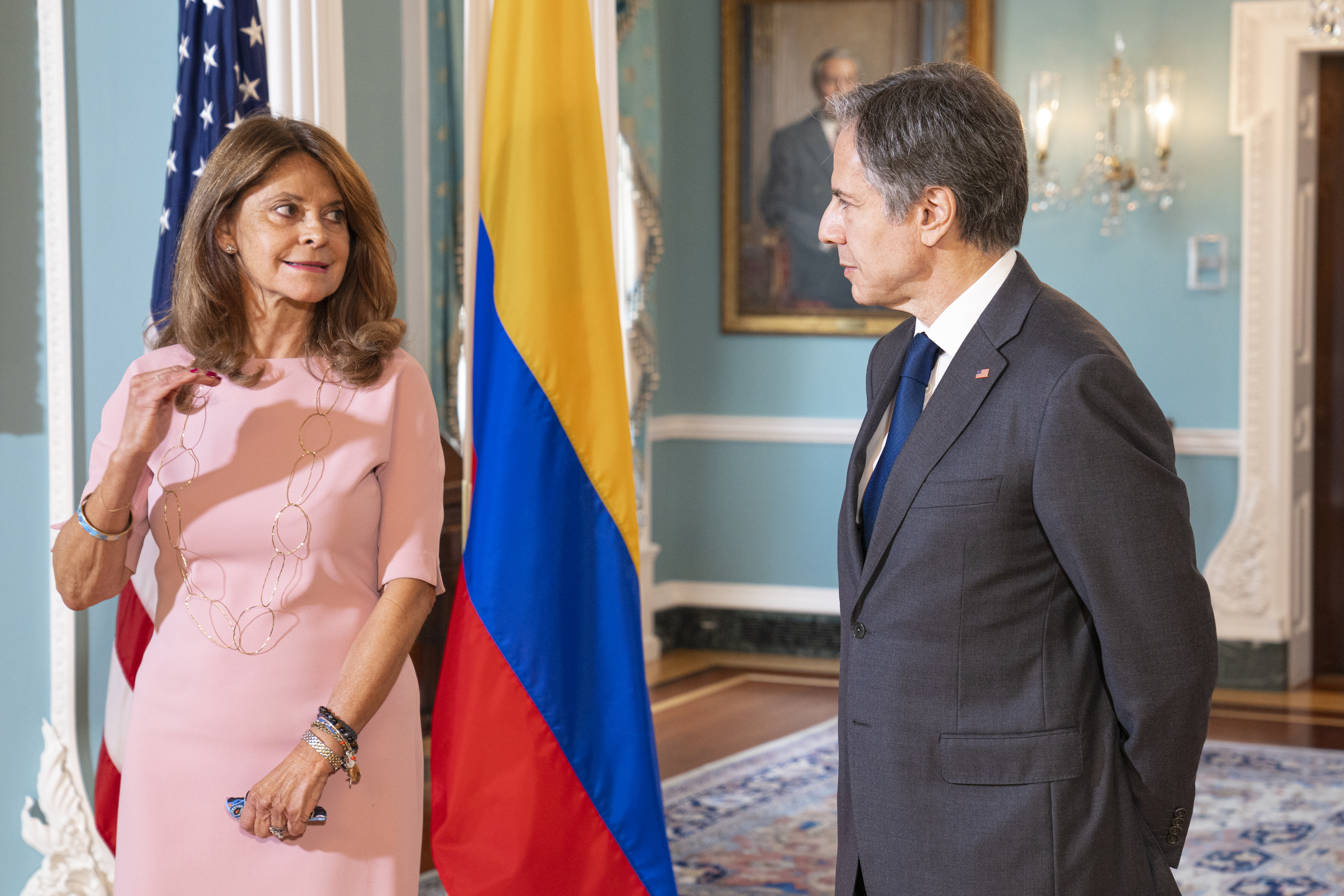
Ramírez with US Secretary of State Antony Blinken in 2021

On 17 June 2018, Ramírez was elected Colombia's first female vice president, alongside former senator Iván Duque Márquez. She assumed office on 7 August 2018.

During COVID-19 pandemic in Colombia, on 23 October 2020 Ramírez tested positive for COVID-19 but was asymptomatic, becoming the highest Colombian official to get infected.

Ramírez left office on 7 August 2022 and was succeeded as vice president by Francia Márquez, whilst Álvaro Leyva replaced her as foreign minister.

== Honours ==
- South Korea: Grand Gwanghwa Medal of the Order of Diplomatic Service Merit (6 May 2022)

Party political offices
Preceded by Noemí Sanín	Conservative nominee for President of Colombia; 2014	Succeeded by Germán Vargas Lleras
Preceded by Carlos Holmes Trujillo	Democratic Center nominee for Vice President of Colombia; 2018	Most recent
Diplomatic posts
Preceded by Juan Camilo Restrepo	Colombian Ambassador to France; 2002	Succeeded by Miguel Gómez Martínez
Political offices
Preceded by Carlos Ronderos Torres	Minister of Foreign Trade; 1998–2002	Succeeded by Ángela María Orozco
Preceded by Gustavo Bell	Minister of National Defense; 2002–2003	Succeeded by Jorge Albero Uribe
Preceded by Óscar Naranjo	Vice President of Colombia; 2018–2022	Succeeded by Francia Márquez
Preceded by Claudia Blum	Minister of Foreign Affairs; 2021–2022	Succeeded by Álvaro Leyva
Order of precedence
Preceded by Óscar Naranjo as former Vice President	Order of precedence of Colombia as former Vice President	Succeeded by Armando Benedetti as Minister of the Interior
