= Óscar Naranjo =

Óscar Naranjo may refer to

- Óscar Naranjo Jara (1905–1963), Chilean teacher and politician, father of:
- Óscar Naranjo Arias (1931–1971), Chilean physician and politician
- Óscar Naranjo Trujillo (born 1956), Colombian politician and retired general, vice-president in 2017–2018
