= Claudia Blum =

Colombian psychologist and politician

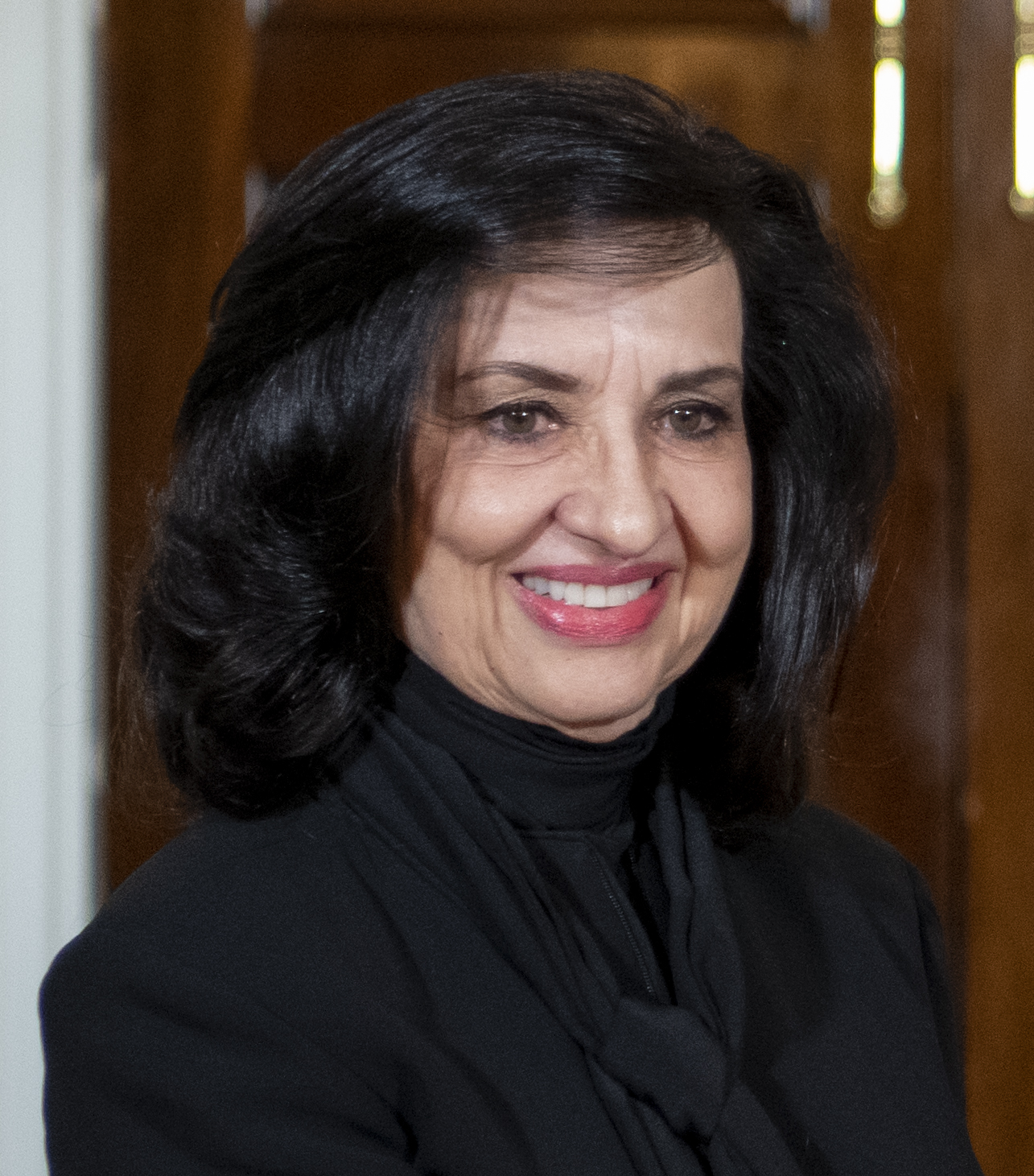

Minister of Foreign Affairs
- In office 12 November 2019 – 9 May 2021
- President: Iván Duque
- Preceded by: Carlos Holmes Trujillo
- Succeeded by: Marta Lucía Ramírez

26th Permanent Representative of Colombia to the United Nations
- In office 11 September 2006 – 22 November 2010
- President: Álvaro Uribe
- Preceded by: María Ángela Holguín
- Succeeded by: Néstor Osorio Londoño

President of the Senate
- In office 20 July 2005 – 20 July 2006
- Preceded by: Luis Humberto Gómez Gallo
- Succeeded by: Dilian Francisca Toro

Senator of Colombia
- In office 20 July 1990 – 20 July 2006

Personal details
- Born: Claudia Blum Capurro; 9 August 1948 (age 78) Cali, Cauca Valley, Colombia
- Party: Radical Change
- Other political affiliations: New Democratic Force (1991); Liberal
- Spouse: Francisco José Barberi (m. 1966)
- Children: Mauricio Barberi Blum; Andrea Barberi Blum
- Education: University of Valle; Pontifical Xavierian University
- Profession: Psychologist

Claudia Blum de Barberi (née Blum Capurro; born 9 August 1948) is a Colombian psychologist and politician who served as foreign minister. A veteran Senator, she became the first woman to serve as President of the Senate of Colombia. She also served as the 26th Permanent Representative of Colombia to the United Nations.

== Background ==
Claudia was born in Cali, Colombia on 9 August 1948 to Harold Blum Mejía and Liliam Capurro Borrero. She first went to school in Cali to the prestigious bilingual school Colegio Colombo Británico until her family moved to Boston, United States, where she finished her high school education. She returned to Colombia to study Psychology at the University of Valle and moved on to obtain her Masters in Political Studies from the Pontifical Xavierian University. She has also carried out advanced studies in negotiation and conflict resolution at the Harvard Law School.

She grew up in a Conservative leaning household but she briefly flirted with the Left as she became interested in politics and was influenced by the Liberal politician Luis Carlos Galán., although she returned to the right for the rest of her political career, and has been particularly loyal to very conservative former president Álvaro Uribe Vélez. In 1982 her father, Harold Blum Mejía, was killed by the rebel forces FARC-EP which prompted most of her family to leave the country, she however chose to stay and continue her political aspirations.

While attending a Cure concert, she met her future husband Francisco José Barberi Ospina CEO of Tecnoquímicas, the biggest pharmaceutical company of Colombia and one of the 50 biggest business groups of the country. Together they have two children Mauricio and Andrea Barberi Blum.

== Career ==
Blum worked in Cali as a journalist for the newspaper El Pueblo, she directed various cultural magazines and worked as a psychologist for the INEM Jorge Isaacs school. She was director of the art foundation Proartes, between 1984 and 1989, from where she revived and organized the International Art Festival of Cali and promoted public investment for the foundation.

She began her political career as a councilor for the Municipality of Cali and in her two terms, the first one from 1984 to 1986 and the second one from 1990 to 1991, she developed her record for working for public spaces, culture, and the environment.

=== Senator ===
She was first elected Senator of Colombia for the New Democratic Force after the ratification of the Colombian Constitution of 1991.

She became Vice President of the Fifth Commission of Congress in 1982, where she worked on creating the Ministry of the Environment and reorganized the work of State entities on the issue, as well as laws on energy, agriculture, and public services. She was also Vice President of the Commission of Legal Ethics, member of the Senate Commission for Peace, and starting in 1994, was a member of the First Commission, body which she presided over from mid-1999 to mid-2000.

As a legislator, Blum worked on important laws and constitutional reforms related to the modernization and transparency of the State, the search for peace, the strengthening of the justice system, the fight against illicit drug trafficking, the protection of the environment, and human rights issues, in particular victims of kidnapping, human trafficking and the rights of children.

Among the most important laws she authored or sponsored as a Senator in Colombia are: the reform to allow the application of extradition as an international cooperation tool against organized crime; the new criminal code; the law for the pursuit and expropriation of assets originating from illicit activities; the Justice and Peace legislation, which defines instruments for the demobilization of members of illegally armed groups within the principles of truth, justice and reparation to victims; the anti-corruption Statute, which has allowed for a more effective penalization of abuses against public administration; the reform that included in the Constitution the possibility of a one-time Presidential reelection, which in turn led to the reelection of Álvaro Uribe Vélez; the national strategy law for the fight against human trafficking. She also organized political debates on the state of education in the country, on actions to improve the attention given to victims of forced displacement due to violence, and on assessments to strengthen the electoral system in Colombia.

=== President of the Senate ===
Her Senate career reached its apex in 2005 when she became the first female President of the Senate of the Republic of Colombia, by now she was a member of the Radical Change, a centre-right party which had supported President Uribe.

As President of the Senate, she led initiatives aimed at increasing public information on legislative work and citizen participation in the process of evaluating laws. She pushed forward the launching of a Congressional television station, as well as initiatives for the better use of technology in the Senate and the Chamber of Representatives, projects for the modernization of the Congressional Library, and actions towards guaranteeing the safety and security of the Legislative branch.

=== Diplomat ===
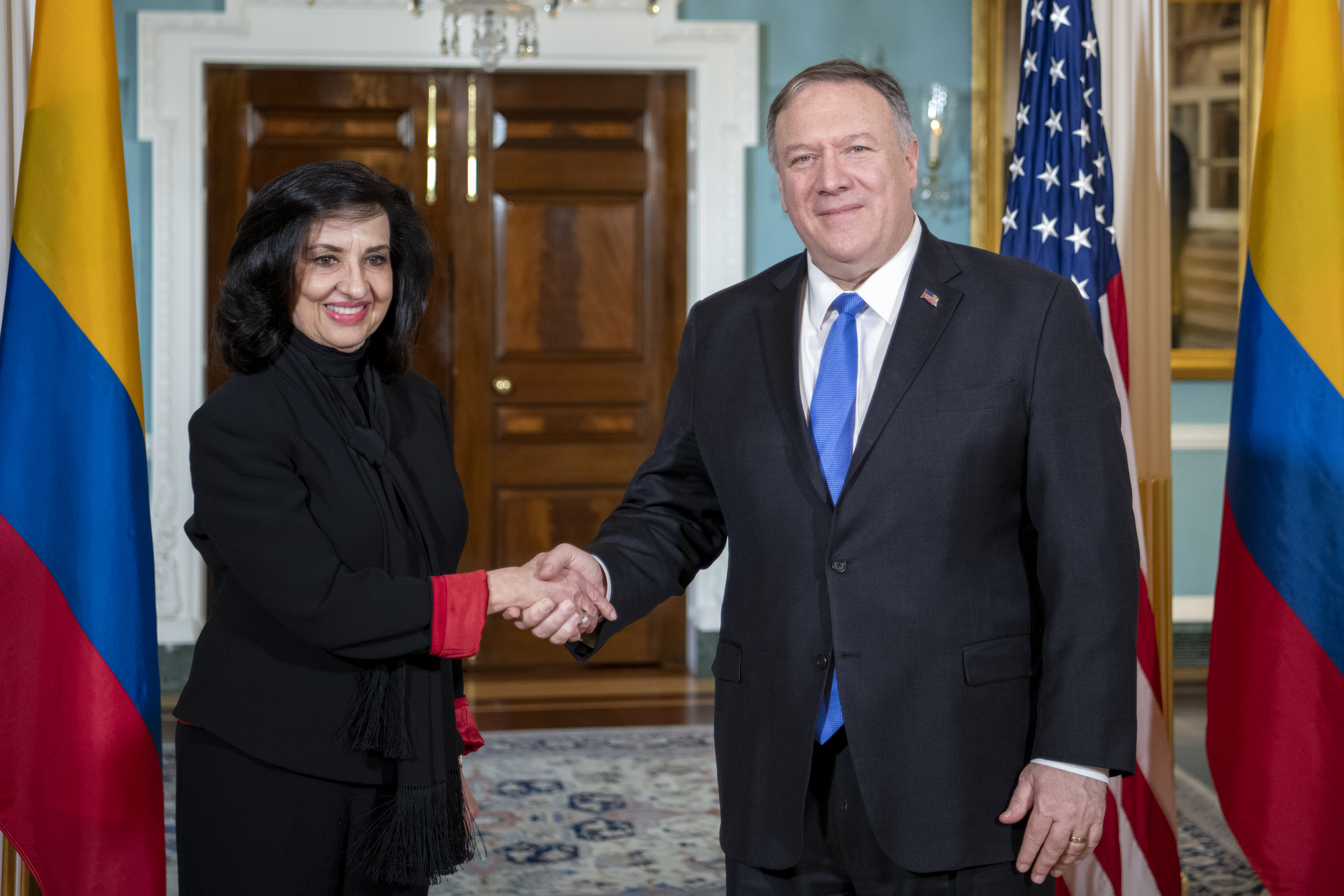
Blum meets with US Secretary of State Mike Pompeo in 2019

In 2006, Blum left the Senate at the request of President Álvaro Uribe to head the Delegation of Colombia to the United Nations in New York City. She was sworn in as Permanent Representative of Colombia to the United Nations on 28 August 2006, by President Uribe and presented her Letter of Credence to UN Secretary-General Kofi Annan on 11 September 2006.

In November 2019, she became the Colombian Minister of Foreign Affairs.

=== Works ===
Blum has also published books on Colombian Government and her career as a legislator.

- Ministerio del Medio Ambiente : Última Oportunidad. Santiago de Cali: Indugráficas. 1993. OCLC 318356532.
- Corrupción: ¿Hasta Cuándo?. Santiago de Cali: Comisión Primera del Senado. 1995. OCLC 36420435.
- De Frente. Santiago de Cali: Feriva. 1997. OCLC 318381227.
- Claudia Blum. (2001). Por La Verdad. Santiago de Cali: Feriva. ISBN 958-33-3044-2. OCLC 318259452.
- Claudia Blum. (2006). El Congreso De Las Reformas. Bogotá: Creamos Alternativas. ISBN 958-33-9505-6. OCLC 318365688.

Political offices
Preceded by Luis Humberto Gómez	President of the Senate; 2005–2006	Succeeded by Dilian Francisca Toro
Preceded by Carlos Holmes Trujillo	Minister of Foreign Affairs; 2019–2021	Succeeded by Marta Lucía Ramírez
Diplomatic posts
Preceded by María Ángela Holguín	Permanent Representative of Colombia to the United Nations; 2006–2010	Succeeded by Néstor Osorio Londoño
