= Beatriz Elena Uribe Botero =

Colombian economist and politician

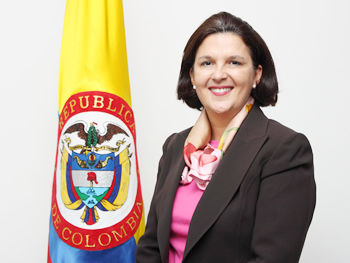

1st President of the National Mining Agency of Colombia
- Assuming office
- President: Juan Manuel Santos Calderón
- Succeeding: Office created

1st Minister of Housing, City and Territory of Colombia
- In office 27 September 2011 – 17 May 2012
- President: Juan Manuel Santos Calderón
- Preceded by: Office created
- Succeeded by: Germán Vargas Lleras

5th Minister of Environment, Housing and Territorial Development of Colombia
- In office 7 August 2010 – 27 September 2011
- President: Juan Manuel Santos Calderón
- Preceded by: Carlos Costa Posada
- Succeeded by: Office abolished

Personal details
- Born: Pereira, Risaralda, Colombia
- Party: Conservative
- Children: Camilo Córdoba Uribe; Santiago Córdoba Uribe
- Education: Our Lady of the Rosary University (B.Sc.); London School of Economics (M.Sc.); University of Bath (M.Sc.)
- Profession: Economist

Beatriz Elena Uribe Botero is a Colombian economist and politician currently serving as the 1st President of the National Mining Agency Colombia.

== Career ==
=== Ministry of Housing ===
Uribe has worked as President of the Colombian Chamber of Construction (Camacol), served as Deputy Minister of Housing during President Álvaro Uribe Vélez's first term in office. On 7 August 2010, the newly elected President, Juan Manuel Santos Calderón appointed her to serve as the 5th Minister of Environment, Housing and Territorial Development. During her time in the Ministry she oversaw the restructuring of the Ministry separating the housing and territory portfolios from that of environment, thus creating two separate ministries in the cabinet. On 27 September 2011 Uribe was reappointed as the 1st Minister of Housing, City and Territory, serving until 17 May 2012 when she was replaced by Germán Vargas Lleras.

== Personal life ==
Uribe was born in Pereira, Risaralda. She has two sons, Camilo and Santiago.
