= Zulema Jattin Corrales =

Colombian politician (born 1969)

Zulema Jattin

Senator of Colombia
- In office 20 July 2006 – 13 May 2009

Member of the Chamber of Representatives
- In office 20 July 1998 – 20 July 2006
- Constituency: Córdoba

President of the Chamber of Representatives
- In office 20 July 2004 – 20 July 2005
- Preceded by: Alonso Acosta Osio
- Succeeded by: Julio Gallardo Archbold

Personal details
- Born: Zulema del Carmen Jattin Corrales; 31 July 1969 (age 57) Lorica, Córdoba, Colombia
- Party: Party of the U
- Other political affiliations: Liberal Opening Movement (2002-2005); Liberal Party (1998-2002)
- Spouse: Luis Humberto Gómez Gallo (2002-2003)
- Relations: Francisco José Jattin Safar (father)
- Children: Zulema María Gómez Jattin
- Education: Complutense University of Madrid (BA); Pontifical Xavierian University (MA)

Zulema del Carmen Jattin Corrales (born 31 July 1969) is a politician, and former Senator of Colombia and Chamber Representative for the Department of Córdoba.

== Career ==
She was elected Councilwoman for Santa Cruz de Lorica from 1990 to 1992, and went on to become the heiress to her father's political career, in 1998 when she was elected to the Chamber of Representatives of Colombia for the Liberal Party. Her father Francisco José Jattin Safar, had been a Chamber Representative from 1990 to 1996 when he lost his investiture for being linked in the Proceso 8000.

In 2004 she was elected President of the Chamber of Representatives of Colombia beating her closest rival William Vélez Mesa, Representative for Antioquia. On 20 July she succeeded Alonso Acosta Osio in the Chamber, at the same time when across Congress, her ex-husband Luis Humberto Gómez Gallo, was taking office as President of the Senate. In 2006, she successfully ran for Senate.

=== Parapolitics scandal ===
In 2008, the Supreme Court of Colombia ran preliminary investigations into Jattin for links to Salvatore Mancuso and Rodrigo Tovar Pupo alias "Jorge 40", both paramilitary chiefs and drug traffickers extradited to the United States but could not find conclusive evidence to charge her for anything.

On 11 May 2009, the Supreme Court issued a warrant for her arrest for links with paramilitarism. During her arrest, her father, Francisco José Jattin, suffered a heart attack and died four days later in a hospital.

As the Supreme Court investigates all charged members of congress, Jattin renounced her seat in Congress on 13 May 2009, thus transferring the process from the Supreme Court to the Office of the Attorney General of Colombia, however, the Supreme Court later ruled that all cases pertaining to congresspersons and linked by parapolitics would be prosecuted by the Supreme Court whether they had renounced their seat or not. She was replaced in Congress by Jairo Mantilla Colmenares.

Due to the death of her father, she was allowed to attend to his funeral in Lorica with a permit from the INPEC, the defence was granted house arrest for Jattin as she was the primary caretaker of her infant child, but she was freed seven months later after the statute of limitations had run out because the prosecution had not formally charged her after detaining her within the set time by the law.

In September 2010, she was called in for questioning by the Court for calumny and slander for statements made to the press when she was arrested; she accused the Court and its members of kidnapping, and persecution among other things, she later recanted her statement, but the court choose to continue with their charge.

I was kidnapped by what this country calls the Supreme Court of Justice (...) the Penal Court is prevaricating, politicking and persecuting (...) poisoned by personal hate and resentment.

— Zulema Jattin Corrales

I voluntarily recanted and expressed that the affirmations were not true and also, I lament the harm I caused to the good name of the honourable Court.

— Zulema Jattin Corrales

=== Electoral history ===
1998 Colombian legislative election
List	Party	Total votes	Percent of Total	Standing	Stronghold
100	Colombian Liberal Party	46,544	13.907%	3rd	Córdoba Department

2002 Colombian legislative election
List	Party	Total votes	Percent of Total	Standing	Stronghold
106	Liberal Opening Movement	61,522	14.931%	2nd	Córdoba Department

2006 Colombian legislative election
List	Party	Total votes	Percent of Total	Seats won	Standing	Stronghold
	Social Party of National Unity	49,378		1	45th	Córdoba Department

== Personal life ==
Zulema del Carmen Jattin Corrales was born on 31 July 1969 in Lorica, Cordobá to Francisco José Jattin Safar and Ema Corrales. She married on 22 June 2002 to Luis Humberto Gómez Gallo but divorced in 2003; together they had one daughter Zulema María.
