= Jorge Alberto Uribe =

Colombian politician and businessman

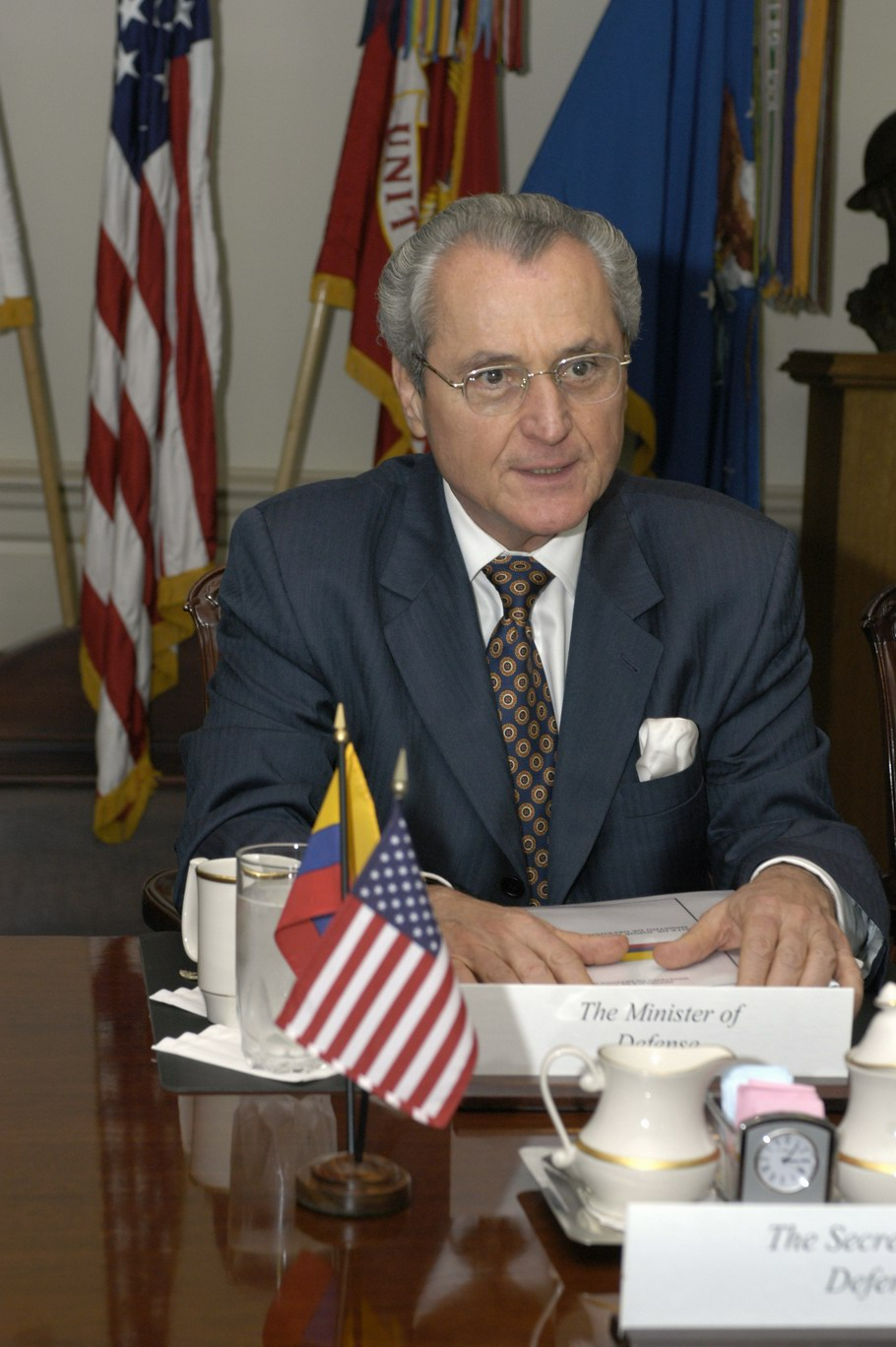
- Jorge Alberto Uribe Echavarria meeting with his American counterpart Secretary of Defense Donald H. Rumsfeld in the Pentagon on 30 September 2004

Minister of National Defense
- In office 9 November 2003 – 7 July 2005
- President: Álvaro Uribe
- Preceded by: Marta Lucía Ramírez
- Succeeded by: Camilo Alfonso Ospina

Personal details
- Born: Jorge Alberto Uribe Echavarría; 30 October 1940 (age 85) Rionegro, Antioquia, Colombia
- Education: George Washington University
- Occupation: Businessman

Jorge Alberto Uribe Echavarría (born 30 October 1940 in Medellín) is a Colombian politician and businessman. In 2003 the government of President Alvaro Uribe appointed him as Minister of Defense of Colombia.

== Biography ==
He was educated at primary and secondary schools in Colombia, with two years spent at Culver Military Academy in the United States. He completed a first degree in economics at George Washington University in the US and did post-graduate work in international marketing at Besançon University in France.

He served as his country's minister of defense, succeeding Marta Lucía Ramírez, who was Colombia's first female defence minister. Prior to that appointment, he served as Finland's honorary consul in Bogotá for a period of ten years.

Jorge Alberto Uribe Echavarría is not related to fellow medellinense President Álvaro Uribe Vélez, but the two are old friends.

== Controversy ==
Jorge Alberto Uribe, rejected the accusations that the newspaper El Nuevo Herald of Miami made about the alleged affair he had with a woman arrested for drug trafficking in El Buen Pastor prison in Medellin. In a press release, the Minister confirmed that he had known this person for ten years and was aware of the alleged criminal activities the woman had been accused with. "In a single opportunity, in early 2003, seven months before my office as Minister of Defense, I visited said person at the Good Shepherd Jail Medellin.
