= Aída Avella =

Colombian politician

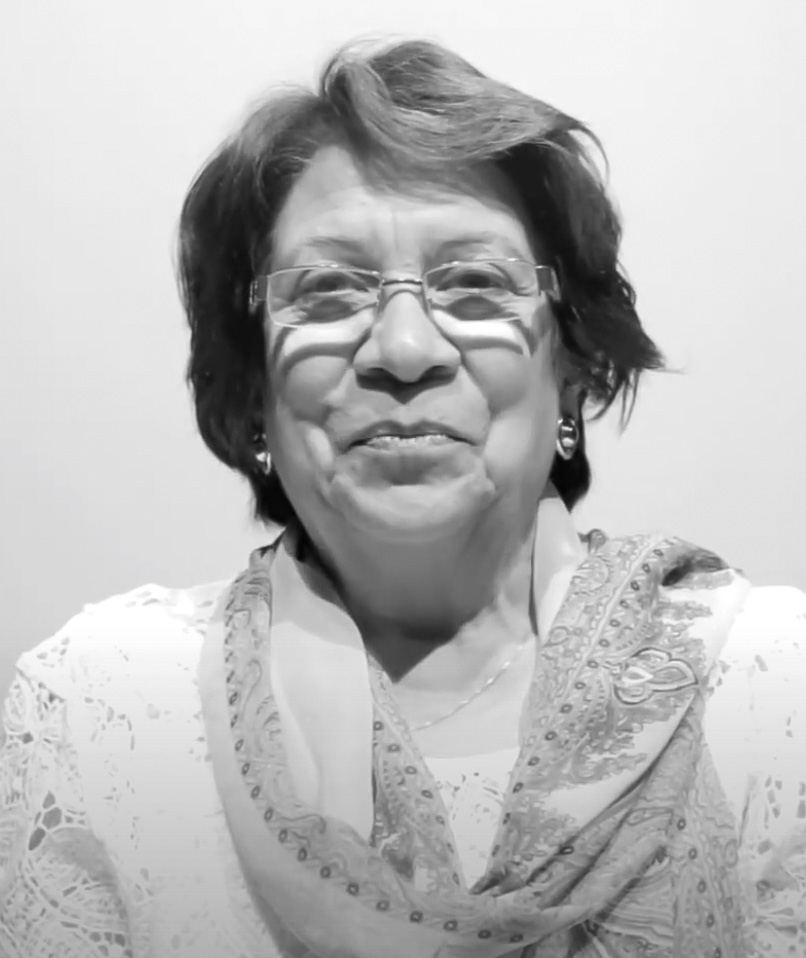

Senate of Colombia
- Incumbent
- Assumed office 20 July 2018

Bogotá City Council
- In office 1 June 1992 – 14 May 1996

Personal details
- Born: 23 January 1949 Sogamoso, Boyacá, Colombia
- Party: Patriotic Union
- Education: National University of Colombia

Aída Yolanda Avella Esquivel, or Aída Yolanda Abella Esquivel (born 23 January 1949), is a Colombian pedagogue, psychologist, and politician belonging to the Patriotic Union party. She was a member of the Constituent Assembly of Colombia and a councilor of the city of Bogotá between 1992 and 1996. Avella was a candidate for Vice President in the 2014 presidential election for the Alternative Democratic Pole and Patriotic Union alliance. In the 2018 parliamentarian election, Avella was elected to the Colombian Senate.

== Biography ==
Aída Yolanda Avella Esquivel was born on 23 January 1949 to a liberal family in Sogamoso, Boyacá Department. At 16, Avella entered the National University of Colombia, where she graduated with a degree in pedagogy and psychology. After graduating, she entered the Ministry of Education, where she became a union leader and helped form the Central Union of Workers, or CUT. She joined the Colombian Communist Party, which became the Patriotic Union after the Agreement of the Uribe. Avella, together with Alfredo Vázquez Carrizosa, was elected to the Constituent Assembly of Colombia in 1991. The next year, she was elected in the 1992 Bogotá elections to the City Council and was reelected two years later.

On 7 May 1996, assailants attacked Avella's vehicle with a bazooka on the Autopista Norte in Bogotá. Avella has unharmed by the attack, but fled the country for Switzerland a week later.

Following her reelection to the Senate in 2018, Avella announced her intent to push forward a universal pensions bill.
