= Juan Lozano Ramírez =

Colombian politician (born 1964)

Juan Francisco Lozano Ramírez
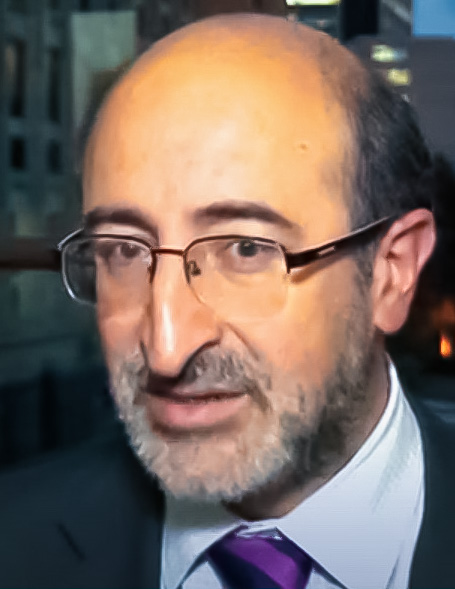
- Juan Lozano in 2013

Senator of Colombia
- Incumbent
- Assumed office 20 July 2010

3rd Minister of Environment, Housing and Territorial Development of Colombia
- In office 5 July 2006 – 21 April 2009
- President: Álvaro Uribe Vélez
- Preceded by: Sandra Suárez Pérez
- Succeeded by: Carlos Costa Posada

High Presidential Advisor
- In office 14 July 2004 – 5 July 2006
- President: Álvaro Uribe Vélez
- Preceded by: José Roberto Arango Pava
- Succeeded by: Cecilia Álvarez-Correa Glen

Personal details
- Born: 19 March 1964 (age 62) Bogotá, D.C., Colombia
- Party: Party of the U (2005-present)
- Other political affiliations: Colombia Always (2003)
- Spouse: Martha Cruz
- Children: María Lozano Cruz
- Education: University of the Andes (LLB)
- Profession: Lawyer
- Website: juanlozano.com.co

Juan Francisco Lozano Ramírez (born 19 March 1964) is a Colombian lawyer and journalist currently serving as Senator of Colombia and since 2010 has been the General Director of the Social Party of National Unity (Party of the U), Colombia's biggest and most influential political coalition. Under the Administration of President Álvaro Uribe Vélez he served as the 3rd Minister of Environment, Housing and Territorial Development (2006-2009), High Presidential Advisor (2004-2006), and Presidential Advisor of Social Policy (2004), and had also served as Presidential Advisor for the Youth, Women, and Family (1990-1993) in the Administration of President César Gaviria Trujillo.
