= Luis Humberto Gómez Gallo =

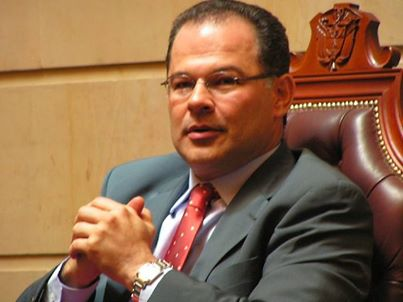
- A Colombian industrial engineer specialized in business administration and constitutional law

Senator of Colombia
- In office 20 July 1994 – 28 May 2008

President of the Senate
- In office 20 July 2004 – 20 July 2005
- Preceded by: Germán Vargas Lleras
- Succeeded by: Claudia Blum

Personal details
- Born: 26 June 1962 Ibagué, Tolima, Colombia
- Died: 25 December 2013 (aged 51) Ibagué, Tolima, Colombia
- Party: Conservative
- Other political affiliations: National Salvation Movement (2006-2009)
- Spouse(s): Zulema Jattín Corrales; Carolina Penuela Ramirez
- Children: Camilo José, Juan Diego and Manuela Lucía
- Education: Catholic University of Colombia; Universidad Externado de Colombia
- Profession: Industrial Engineer

Luis Humberto Gómez Gallo (26 June 1962 − 25 December 2013) was a Colombian industrial engineer specialized in business administration and constitutional law. A Conservative politician, he served as President of the Senate of Colombia where he had been a Senator from 1994 until 2008 when he was charged and arrested as part of a wider parapolitica scandal. He died of a heart attack at the age of 51 on 25 December 2013 in Ibague, Tolima.

== Early years ==
He attended the Catholic University of Colombia graduating in Industrial engineering and did post graduate studies in business administration. He also did post graduate studies at the Universidad Externado de Colombia graduating in constitutional law.

== Political career ==
Gómez Gallo was appointed Secretary of Public Works for the department of Tolima. In 1986 he ran for councilman for a seat in the Council of Ibague for which he was elected for the period 1986-1992 representing the Colombian Conservative Party.

=== Senator of Colombia (1997−2013) ===
In 1994, Gómez Gallo ran for congress and was elected senator of Colombia. He was then reelected for the 1998, 2002 and 2006 periods. He was president of the senate and President of the Congress of Colombia for the period between 20 July 2004 and 20 July 2005. He was married to Zulema Jattin Corrales.

As senator, Gómez Gallo was President of the First Commission of Congress from 20 July 2003 to 20 July 2004 which debates topics related to Constitutional matters. He was also Vice President for this same commission for two consecutive periods.

==== Parapolitica scandal ====
Gómez Gallo was under investigation by the Supreme Court after being involved in the Parapolitica scandal in which politicians mingled with paramilitary groups to coerce voters in their favor. He was also investigated for his relationship to drug trafficker Eduardo Restrepo Victoria, alias "El Socio".

On 10 October 2007, units of the Attorney General arrested Gómez Gallo in Bogotá after the President of the Penal Chamber of the Supreme Court issued an arrest warrant against him. This after a paramilitary under investigation named José Wilton Bedoya Rayo, alias "Moisés", from the Tolima Bloc of the demobilized United Self-Defense Forces of Colombia accused him of being involved in the assassination of congressman Pompilio de Jesús Avendaño in 2001. According to the paramilitary member, Gómez Gallo paid COP$300 million pesos for the assassination.
