= 2014 Colombian presidential election =

- 25 May 2014 (first round); 15 June 2014 (second round)
- Turnout: 40.10% (first round) ▼9.20pp 47.97% (second round) ▲3.62pp
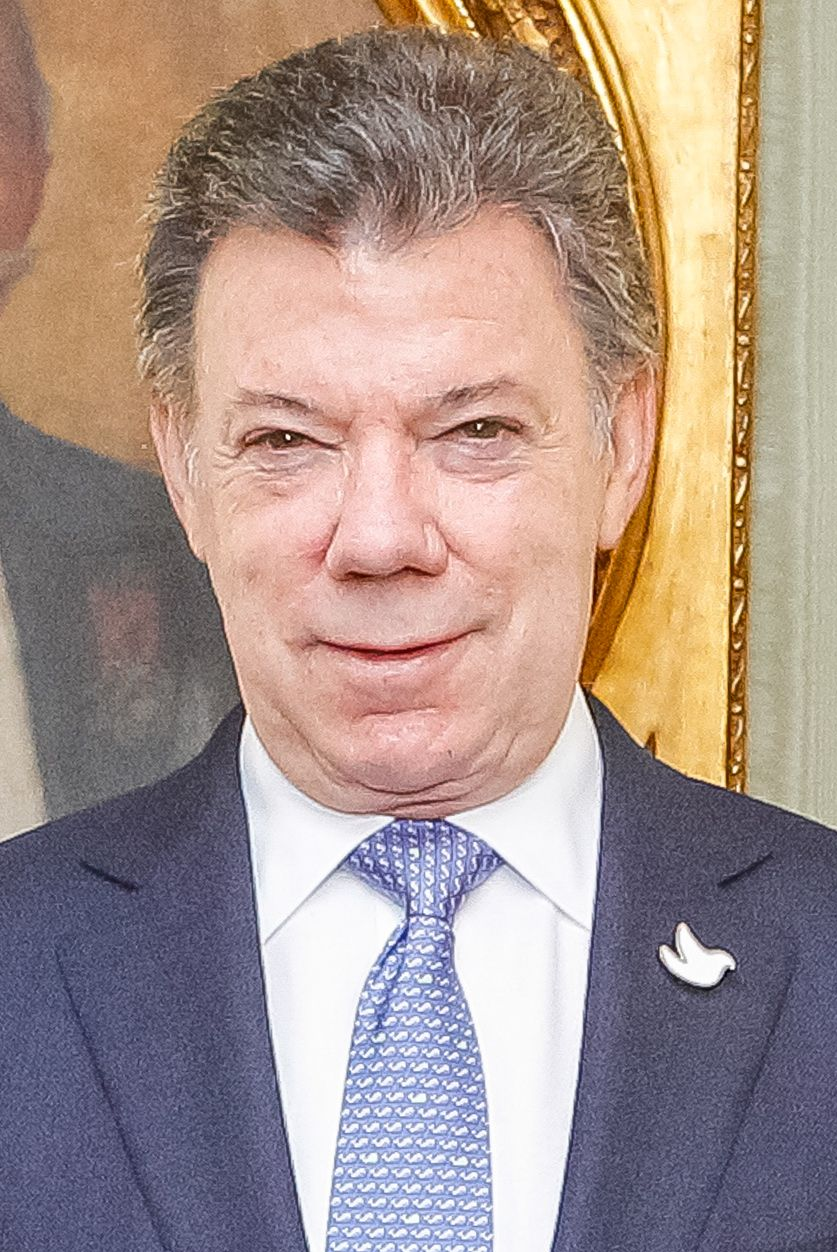

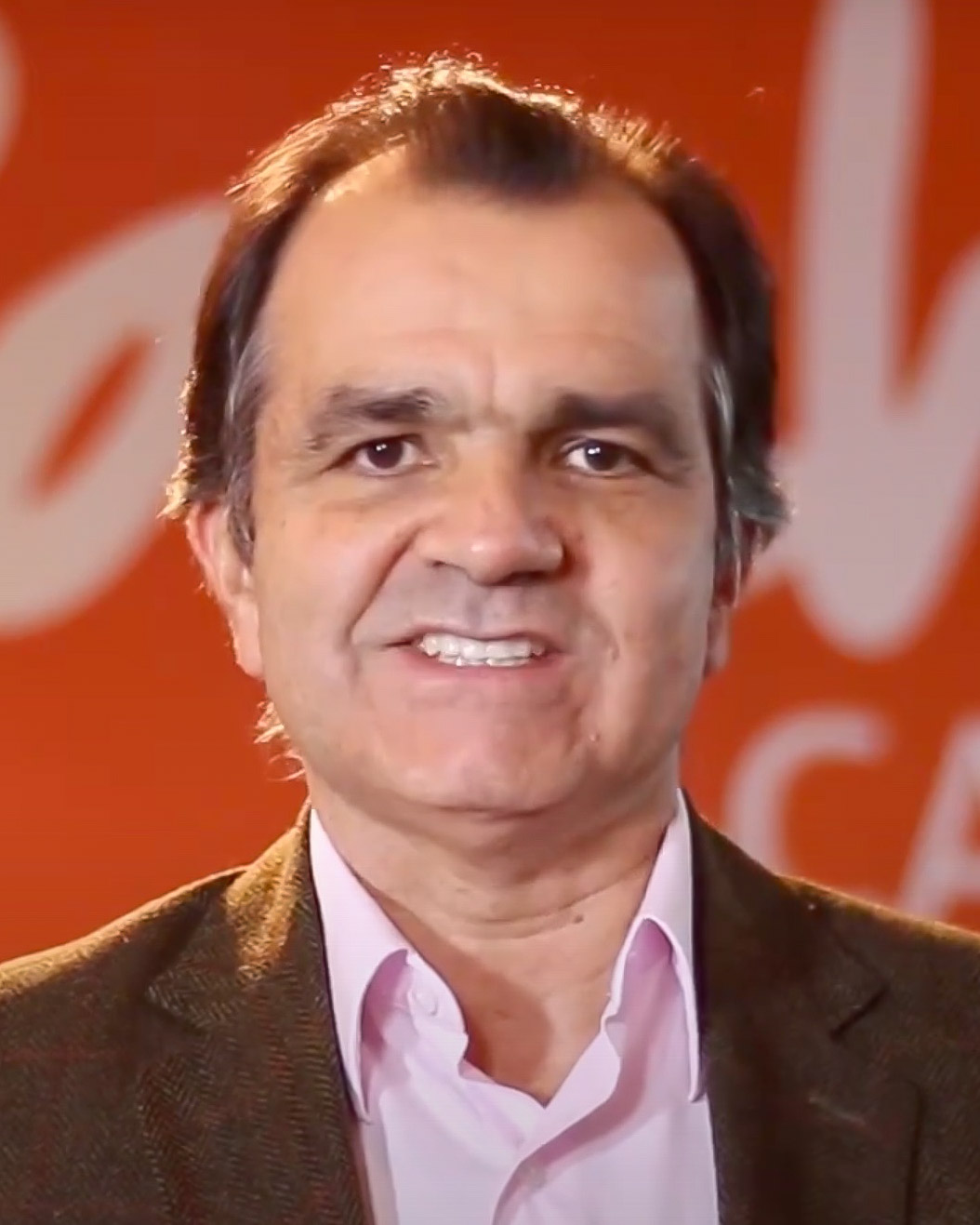
Nominee	Juan Manuel Santos	Óscar Iván Zuluaga
Party	Party of the U	Democratic Centre
Alliance	National Unity	–
Running mate	Germán Vargas Lleras	Carlos Holmes Trujillo
Popular vote	7,839,342	6,917,001
Percentage	50.99%	44.99%
President before election
Juan Manuel Santos
Party of the U
Elected President
Juan Manuel Santos
Party of the U

Presidential elections were held in Colombia on 25 May 2014. Since no candidate received 50% of the vote in the first round, a run-off between the two candidates with the most votes took place three weeks later on 15 June 2014. According to the official figures released by the National Registry office (Registraduría Nacional), as of 22 May 2014 (the cut-off date to register) 32,975,158 Colombians were registered and entitled to vote in the 2014 presidential election, including 545,976 Colombians resident abroad. Incumbent president Juan Manuel Santos was allowed to run for a second consecutive term. In the first round, Santos and Óscar Iván Zuluaga of the Democratic Center (Centro Democrático) were the two highest-polling candidates and were the contestants in the 15 June run-off. In the second round, Santos was re-elected president, gaining 51% of the vote compared with 45% for Zuluaga.

== Candidates ==
By law the incumbent president Juan Manuel Santos had to declare before 25 November 2013 (six months before the election date) whether he would stand again for president. There had been speculation that he would not seek re-election: he had come under strong criticism during his first term for not continuing with the strong anti-terrorist measures of his predecessor Álvaro Uribe and for opening peace talks with the FARC guerrilla group, which drew fierce criticism from the still-popular Uribe and a large section of the public, resulting in low popularity ratings. Although his governing National Unity coalition still supported Santos in his re-election bid, there was speculation that other people would stand in his place, such as the Radical Change leader and experienced minister Germán Vargas Lleras, Vice President Angelino Garzón, and the retired head of the police force, General Oscar Naranjo. However, on 20 November Santos publicly declared his intention to stand for election again, citing a successful conclusion to the peace talks as one of the main factors for seeking a second term in office. His candidacy was supported unopposed by all three parties of the governing National Unity coalition: his own Social Party of National Unity, commonly known as "Party of the U"; the Colombian Liberal Party; and Radical Change. The following day Garzón said he would not seek reelection as Vice President in 2014. On 24 February 2014 Santos confirmed that Vargas Lleras would be his running mate for the 2014 election.

Unhappy with Santos' more conciliatory approach to the FARC, Álvaro Uribe had left the Party of the U to form the Democratic Center movement in January 2013 along with his former vicepresident Francisco Santos (cousin of president Juan Manuel Santos) and other close allies from the Party of the U. The Democratic Center's convention on 25–26 October 2013 chose economist and ex-minister Óscar Iván Zuluaga as its candidate for the presidential elections, ahead of Francisco Santos and Carlos Holmes Trujillo. On 28 February 2014 Trujillo was named as Zuluaga's vicepresidencial running mate.

The Colombian Conservative Party overwhelmingly chose Marta Lucía Ramírez to be its presidential candidate at its convention on 26 January 2014. Ramírez polled 1047 votes from the delegates, comfortably ahead of the other contenders Pablo Victoria with 138 votes and Álvaro Leyva with 84 votes. The convention was a fraught affair, with heated debate between some delegates arguing that the party should support the National Unity coalition and reelection of President Santos, and others who were in favour of the party fielding their own candidate. Ramírez was a defence minister in Álvaro Uribe's government, but left the Party of the U after Santos' election and rejoined the Conservative Party where she had begun her political career, becoming one of Santos' most vocal critics.

The main socialist opposition party, the Alternative Democratic Pole (PDA), had been split by infighting in the four years since the previous election. Its 2010 election candidate Gustavo Petro had acrimoniously left the party along with his followers after accusing the PDA's Samuel Moreno, then Mayor of Bogota, of corruption, a charge of which Moreno was later found guilty, and removed from his position and jailed. Petro formed the Progressives Movement (Movimiento Progresistas) in 2011 and successfully ran for Mayor of Bogota himself. Another faction of the PDA left to form the Patriotic March (Marcha Patriótica) movement. The PDA was, however, the first party to confirm its candidate for the 2014 election, choosing its president and former caretaker Mayor of Bogotá Clara López Obregón at its third national congress on 9 November 2012.

The Green Party had also suffered serious divisions since its surprise second place in the 2010 election. The defeated 2010 presidential candidate Antanas Mockus had resigned from the Green Party in June 2011, opposed to the decision to accept Álvaro Uribe's support for the party's Bogotá mayoral candidate Enrique Peñalosa. On 25 September 2013, after a year of negotiations, the Fourth National Congress of the Green Party confirmed a union with the Progressives Movement of Bogotá mayor Gustavo Petro, with the new name Green Alliance. This new political alliance decided that its candidate for the 2014 elections would be chosen by a national vote on 9 March 2014, the same day as the parliamentary elections. On 21 November 2013 the Green Alliance confirmed that there were six pre-candidates for the position: former Bogotá mayor Enrique Peñalosa, senators John Sudarsky and Camilo Romero, ex-presidential candidate and former FARC hostage Ingrid Betancourt, the Progressives Movement spokesman Antonio Navarro, and indigenous leader Feliciano Valencia. Betancourt, Navarro and Valencia failed to reach the party's "10% recognition amongst Colombians" requirement to stand as a candidate, leaving Peñalosa, Sudarsky and Romero as the three remaining potential candidates. In the election on 9 March 2014 Enrique Peñalosa was elected as the Green Alliance's presidential candidate with 48% of the vote, comfortably ahead of Romero (17%) and Sudarsky (8%). On 18 March 2014 Peñalosa announced that his running mate would be Isabel Segovía, a former deputy minister of education in the Uribe government.

The far-left Patriotic Union party chose its former president Aída Avella to be its presidential candidate at its fifth national congress on 16 November 2013. Avella had just returned from 17 years in exile in Switzerland after fleeing Colombia in 1996 following an attempt on her life. However, the poor showing of the Patriotic Union in the parliamentary elections (where they failed to win a seat in either house of Congress) led to Avella abandoning her presidential campaign and instead agreeing to unite the Patriotic Front with the Alternative Democratic Pole as a single left-wing opposition alliance, with Avella becoming López's running mate for the presidential election.

=== Summary of candidates ===
The following candidates appeared on the ballot for the first round in the following order:

Party	Presidential nominee	Vice-Presidential nominee	Coalition
Alternative Democratic Pole	Clara López	Aída Avella	PDA–UP
Colombian Conservative Party	Marta Lucía Ramírez	Camilo Gómez	—N/a
Social Party of National Unity	Juan Manuel Santos	Germán Vargas Lleras	National Unity
Green Party	Enrique Peñalosa	Isabel Segovia	Green Alliance
Democratic Center	Óscar Iván Zuluaga	Carlos Holmes Trujillo	—N/a

== Opinion polls ==
=== First round ===
The following table shows the results of opinion polls conducted from November 2013, when most of the presidential candidates had been confirmed, up to 15 May 2014. The table does not include the votes in the earliest polls for potential candidates who subsequently did not stand for election. The two highest scoring candidates in each poll (who would hypothetically go through to the second round of voting) are highlighted, except for the Centro Nacional de Consultoría poll of 17 January–7 February 2014, where Santos' score of 51% would have been enough to win in the first round.

A notable feature of the early polls was the high percentage of people intending to cast a blank vote (voto en blanco), usually between 20% and 30%. This reflected the widespread dissatisfaction among the Colombian public with all the candidates and the political system in general. After the parliamentary elections and the election of Peñalosa as candidate for the Green Alliance, both of which occurred on 9 March 2014, the polls showed a sharp drop in the percentage of people intending to cast a blank vote.

Date(s) conducted	Polling organisation/client	Sample size	Candidate						Blank vote	Don't know/No response	Margin of error
Date(s) conducted	Polling organisation/client	Sample size	J.M. Santos	O.I. Zuluaga	E. Peñalosa	C. López	M.L. Ramírez	A. Avella	Blank vote	Don't know/No response	Margin of error
1–6 November 2013	Invamer–Gallup Colombia/Caracol Televisión, Blu Radio & major newspapers	713	28.0%	14.6%	8.7%	9.3%	5.7%	–	31.9%	1.9%	3.7%
21–25 November 2013	Datexco/El Tiempo & W Radio	1200	36.1%	11.9%	6.2%	6.3%	1.5%	0.9%	20.3%	11.0%	2.83%
22 November 2013	Centro Nacional de Consultoría/CM&	970	41%	13%	10%	5%	4%	–	10%	17%	3.0%
22–23 November 2013	Ipsos–Napoleón Franco/RCN, La FM & Revista Semana	1225	26%	12%	4%	6%	2%	1%	21%	25%	2.8%
22–27 November 2013	Cifras y Conceptos/Caracol Radio & Red Más Noticias	2500	26%	13%	5%	8%	–	1%	35%	–	2.9%
2–9 December 2013	Invamer–Gallup Colombia/Caracol Televisión, Blu Radio & major newspapers	756	36.0%	14.2%	5.1%	6.2%	5.8%	0.9%	26.4%	3.7%	3.6%
3–6 December 2013	Datexco/El Tiempo & W Radio	1000	28%	10%	9%	8%	3%	1%	unknown	unknown	3.1%
16–20 January 2014	Cifras y Conceptos/Caracol Radio & Red Más Noticias	2500	26%	8%	9%	7%	–	1%	30%	19%	2.9%
17 January–7 February 2014	Centro Nacional de Consultoría/CM&	2378	51%	9%	12%	7%	8%	3%	10%	unknown	2%
28–29 January 2014	Ipsos–Napoleón Franco/RCN, La FM & Revista Semana	1008	25%	8%	6%	6%	4%	1%	27%	23%	3.1%
29–31 January 2014	Datexco/El Tiempo & W Radio	1200	24.4%	7.6%	7.1%	6.0%	7.7%	0.7%	30.5%	14.1%	2.83%
5–9 February 2014	Invamer–Gallup Colombia/Caracol Televisión, Blu Radio & major newspapers	678	34.7%	10.8%	8.6%	4.5%	8.5%	1.6%	28.1%	3.2%	3.8%
10–15 February 2014	Cifras y Conceptos/Caracol Radio & Red Más Noticias	2500	26%	7%	6%	5%	4%	1%	30%	20%	2.9%
20–24 February 2014	Cifras y Conceptos/Caracol Radio & Red Más Noticias	2500	31%	8%	9%	7%	4%	1%	27%	12%	2.9%
21–24 February 2014	Ipsos–Napoleón Franco/RCN, La FM & Revista Semana	1201	28%	8%	5%	4%	3%	2%	24%	–	2.8%
25–28 February 2014	Datexco/El Tiempo y W Radio	1200	24.2%	6.3%	6.3%	4.9%	4.1%	3.6%	41.5%	8.6%	2.83%
13–14 March 2014	Datexco/El Tiempo y W Radio	1000	25.5%	14.6%	17.1%	10.7%	7.7%	n/a	16.9%	7.5%	3.1%
15–17 March 2014	Centro Nacional de Consultoría/CM&	1113	30%	10%	16%	10%	9%	n/a	8%	17%	3.0%
13–17 March 2014	Invamer–Gallup Colombia/Caracol Televisión, Blu Radio & major newspapers	1200	32.5%	15.6%	11.3%	8.6%	9.3%	n/a	19.6%	2.7%	3.0%
14–16 March 2014	Ipsos–Napoleón Franco/RCN, La FM & Revista Semana	1233	24%	9%	8%	9%	4%	n/a	19%	27%	2.8%
19–22 March 2014	Centro Nacional de Consultoría/CM&	1500	27%	13%	18%	10%	7%	n/a	8%	17%	2.5%
21–25 March 2014	Cifras y Conceptos/Caracol Radio & Red Más Noticias	2500	23%	11%	13%	9%	5%	n/a	26%	13%	2.9%
21–23 April 2014	Ipsos–Napoleón Franco/RCN, La FM & Revista Semana	1208	23%	15%	11%	6%	6%	n/a	14%	22%	2.8%
21–24 April 2014	Datexco/El Tiempo y W Radio	1974	28.3%	16.0%	15.7%	9.6%	7.2%	n/a	17.3%	5.8%	2.8%
23–27 April 2014	Invamer–Gallup Colombia/Caracol Televisión, Blu Radio & major newspapers	1200	32.0%	20.5%	10.1%	7.1%	11.2%	n/a	15.9%	3.2%	3.0%
26–28 April 2014	Cifras y Conceptos/Caracol Radio & Red Más Noticias	2500	27%	19%	10%	10%	8%	n/a	17%	8%	2.9%
6–10 May 2014	Centro Nacional de Consultoría/CM&	1500	22%	24%	13%	9%	9%	n/a	9%	14%	2.5%
9–12 May 2014	Cifras y Conceptos/Caracol Radio & Red Más Noticias	2762	27.7%	23.9%	9.7%	10.0%	8.7%	n/a	11.5%	8.5%	2.9%
10–13 May 2014	Datexco/El Tiempo y W Radio	2392	27.7%	25.6%	9.7%	9.7%	9.4%	n/a	15.0%	2.9%	2.8%
10–13 May 2014	Invamer–Gallup Colombia/Caracol Televisión, Blu Radio & major newspapers	1184	29%	29.3%	10.6%	10.9%	14.4%	n/a	5.8%	unknown	3.0%
13–15 May 2014	Ipsos–Napoleón Franco/RCN, La FM & Revista Semana	1799	28.5%	29.5%	9.4%	10.1%	9.7%	n/a	12.8%	unknown	3.4%

=== Second round ===
Date(s) conducted	Polling organisation/client	Sample size	Candidate		Blank vote	Don't know/No response	Margin of error
Date(s) conducted	Polling organisation/client	Sample size	Juan Manuel Santos	Óscar Iván Zuluaga	Blank vote	Don't know/No response	Margin of error
26–27 May 2014	Centro Nacional de Consultoría/CM&	1996	45%	47%	8%	n/a	2.2%
26–27 May 2014	Cifras y Conceptos/Caracol Radio & Red Más Noticias	1672	38%	37%	15%	10%	2.9%
May 31–June 3, 2014	Invamer–Gallup Colombia/Caracol Televisión, Blu Radio & major newspapers	1200	47.7%	48.5%	3.7%	n/a	3.0%
31 May–3 June 2014	Cifras y Conceptos/Caracol Radio & Red Más Noticias	3215	43.4%	38.5%	11.7%	6.3%	2.9%
31 May–4 June 2014	Datexco/El Tiempo & W Radio	1200	41.9%	37.7%	13.8%	5.8%	2.83%
June 2–4, 2014	Ipsos–Napoleón Franco/RCN, La FM & Revista Semana	1784	41%	49%	10%	n/a	2.3%

== Results ==
Candidate	Running mate	Party	First round		Second round	
Candidate	Running mate	Party	Votes	%	Votes	%
Juan Manuel Santos	Germán Vargas Lleras	Social Party of National Unity	3,310,794	25.72	7,839,342	50.99
Óscar Iván Zuluaga	Carlos Holmes Trujillo	Democratic Center	3,769,005	29.28	6,917,001	44.99
Marta Lucía Ramírez	Camilo Gómez	Colombian Conservative Party	1,997,980	15.52		
Clara López	Aída Avella	Alternative Democratic Pole	1,958,518	15.22		
Enrique Peñalosa	Isabel Segovia	Green Party	1,064,758	8.27		
Blank votes			770,543	5.99	618,759	4.02
Total			12,871,598	100.00	15,375,102	100.00
Valid votes			12,871,598	97.35	15,375,102	97.20
Invalid votes			350,756	2.65	443,112	2.80
Total votes			13,222,354	100.00	15,818,214	100.00
Registered voters/turnout			32,975,158	40.10	32,975,158	47.97
Source: Registraduría Nacional del Estado Civil, Registraduría Nacional del Estado Civil

=== By department ===
==== First round ====
Department	Zuluaga		Santos		Ramírez		Obregón		Peñalosa		Blank votes	
Department	Votes	%	Votes	%	Votes	%	Votes	%	Votes	%	Votes	%
Amazonas	4,460	32.24%	4,841	35.00%	1,443	10.43%	1,811	13.09%	826	5.97%	450	3.25%
Antioquia	665,160	39.65%	286,742	16.23%	334,312	18.92%	248,628	14.07%	98,144	5.55%	133,404	7.55%
Arauca	25,425	44.67%	14,741	25.90%	1,407	8.62%	6,651	11.68%	2,441	4.28%	2,742	4.81%
Atlántico	77,446	19.06%	195,529	48.13%	33,181	8.16%	56,869	14.00%	24,319	5.98%	18,861	4.64%
Bogotá	524,459	22.10%	444,007	18.09%	366,394	14.93%	500,603	20.40%	392,460	15.99%	207,525	8.45%
Bolívar	122,506	32.68%	144,166	38.45%	25,411	6.77%	47,664	12.71%	19,802	5.28%	15,313	4.08%
Boyacá	121,291	30.09%	64,463	15.99%	83,319	20.67%	84,835	21.04%	31,904	7.91%	17,240	4.27%
Caldas	141,059	40.52%	62,785	18.03%	54,295	15.59%	44,861	12.88%	24,755	7.11%	20,310	5.83%
Caquetá	47,063	51.69%	15,216	16.71%	8,143	8.94%	10,896	11.96%	5,080	5.58%	4,641	5.09%
Casanare	70,058	57.67%	10,831	8.91%	12,432	10.23%	12,313	10.13%	10,299	8.47%	5,527	4.55%
Cauca	54,375	16.30%	150,434	45.12%	42,497	12.74%	49,328	14.79%	19,341	5.80%	17,412	5.22%
Cesar	71,291	29.60%	103,020	42.77%	18,852	7.82%	28,858	11.98%	10,226	4.24%	8,587	3.56%
Chocó	16,686	20.50%	42,747	52.53%	8,683	10.67%	5,784	7.10%	3,383	4.15%	4,091	5.02%
Consulates/Abroad	41,370	41.24%	25,121	25.04%	5,350	5.33%	10,010	9.97%	14,015	13.97%	4,444	4.43%
Córdoba	114,960	28.11%	205,061	50.15%	35,407	8.66%	27,751	6.78%	11,448	2.80%	14,224	3.47%
Cundinamarca	255,598	31.62%	144,346	17.86%	186,690	23.10%	116,562	14.42%	56,156	6.94%	48,757	6.03%
Guainía	1,911	30.19%	2,828	44.69%	635	10.03%	475	7.50%	306	4.83%	173	2.73%
Guaviare	6,631	37.11%	6,689	37.44%	1,889	10.57%	963	5.39%	771	4.31%	921	5.15%
Huila	140,904	46.46%	34,471	11.36%	44,028	14.51%	52,848	17.42%	19,514	6.43%	11,495	3.79%
La Guajira	28,509	23.97%	57,275	48.16%	9,821	8.25%	13,081	11.00%	6,393	5.37%	3,825	3.21%
Magdalena	69,965	26.15%	135,830	50.76%	19,042	7.11%	25,767	9.63%	8,852	3.30%	8,088	3.02%
Meta	126,996	43.17%	48,102	16.35%	50,807	17.27%	37,864	12.87%	17,340	5.89%	13,019	4.42%
Nariño	74,942	19.25%	166,906	42.88%	43,009	11.05%	66,815	17.16%	21,898	5.62%	15,593	4.00%
Norte de Santander	118,134	31.04%	105,470	27.71%	75,550	19.85%	36,771	9.66%	25,227	6.62%	19,395	5.09%
Putumayo	10,870	16.98%	24,846	38.79%	12,002	18.74%	10,537	16.46%	3,166	4.94%	2,601	4.06%
Quindío	56,497	29.04%	46,539	23.92%	31,548	16.21%	24,953	12.82%	21,549	11.07%	13,427	6.90%
Risaralda	98,280	30.10%	63,636	19.49%	70,539	21.60%	42,928	13.15%	30,438	9.33%	20,580	6.30%
San Andrés and Providencia	2,620	30.58%	3,264	38.10%	579	6.75%	701	8.18%	804	9.38%	598	6.98%
Santander	186,420	27.69%	176,416	26.20%	121,389	18.03%	107,158	15.91%	44,251	6.57%	37,567	5.58%
Sucre	82,374	34.10%	113,088	46.81%	11,526	4.77%	20,588	8.52%	5,771	2.38%	8,209	3.39%
Tolima	169,798	40.86%	88,177	21.22%	58,769	14.14%	49.122	11.82%	27,625	6.64%	22,041	5.30%
Valle del Cauca	216,620	18.92%	315,698	27.57%	224,405	19.60%	213,557	18.65%	105,509	9.21%	69,040	6.03%
Vaupés	833	15.93%	3,267	62.50%	311	5.94%	390	7.46%	312	5.96%	114	2.18%
Vichada	5,494	46.42%	4,232	35.76%	815	6.88%	576	4.86%	388	3.27%	329	2.78%
Source: Registraduría Nacional del Estado Civil

==== Second round ====
Department	Santos		Zuluaga		Blank votes	
Department	Votes	%	Votes	%	Votes	%
Amazonas	6,967	43.83%	8,500	53.48%	426	2.68%
Antioquia	704,585	35.79%	1,139,007	57.86%	124,919	6.34%
Arauca	37,305	49.06%	36,434	47.92%	2,290	3.01%
Atlántico	542,942	78.22%	139,389	20.08%	11,727	1.68%
Bogotá	1,341,963	52.54%	1,076,816	42.16%	135,053	5.28%
Bolívar	310,048	58.00%	212,655	39.78%	11,789	2.20%
Boyacá	187,369	39.82%	264,670	56.25%	18,454	3.92%
Caldas	131,239	33.62%	239,148	61.28%	19,860	5.08%
Caquetá	34,619	32.44%	67,769	63.51%	4,317	4.04%
Casanare	25,162	18.38%	106,440	77.75%	5,287	3.86%
Cauca	312,472	72.21%	108,013	24.96%	12,221	2.82%
Cesar	201,362	60.68%	123,546	37.23%	6,926	2.08%
Chocó	61,852	63.54%	32,889	33.79%	2,588	2.65%
Consulates/Abroad	43,870	39.66%	63,887	57.75%	2,851	2.57%
Córdoba	376,652	63.65%	206,393	34.88%	8,637	1.45%
Cundinamarca	370,791	41.38%	486,063	54.25%	39,076	4.36%
Guainía	4,274	54.71%	3,336	42.70%	201	2.57%
Guaviare	10,055	46.35%	10,832	49.94%	802	3.69%
Huila	95,987	25.88%	262,807	70.88%	11,976	3.23%
La Guajira	120,033	71.15%	45,848	27.17%	2,806	1.66%
Magdalena	259,428	67.75%	117,246	30.62%	6,198	1.61%
Meta	105,748	32.67%	206,061	63.67%	11,794	3.64%
Nariño	345,485	66.08%	163,932	31.35%	13,396	2.56%
Norte de Santander	239,539	50.35%	219,934	46.23%	16,195	3.40%
Putumayo	58,561	66.87%	26,193	29.91%	2,813	3.21%
Quindío	99,822	44.81%	111,470	50.04%	11,433	5.13%
Risaralda	149,814	41.07%	193,169	52.96%	21,730	5.95%
San Andrés and Providencia	5,773	53.16%	4,714	43.41%	372	3.42%
Santander	429,356	53.15%	348,328	43.12%	30,026	3.71%
Sucre	199,424	60.08%	127,028	38.27%	5,428	1.63%
Tolima	184,496	36.98%	296,610	59.45%	17,780	3.56%
Valle del Cauca	831,748	61.61%	459,146	34.01%	58,960	4.36%
Vaupés	4,149	70.42%	1,649	27.99%	93	1.57%
Vichada	6,452	46.53%	7,079	51.05%	335	2.41%
Source: Registraduría Nacional del Estado Civil
