= Camilo Ospina Bernal =

Colombian lawyer and politician

Camilo Alfonso Ospina Bernal
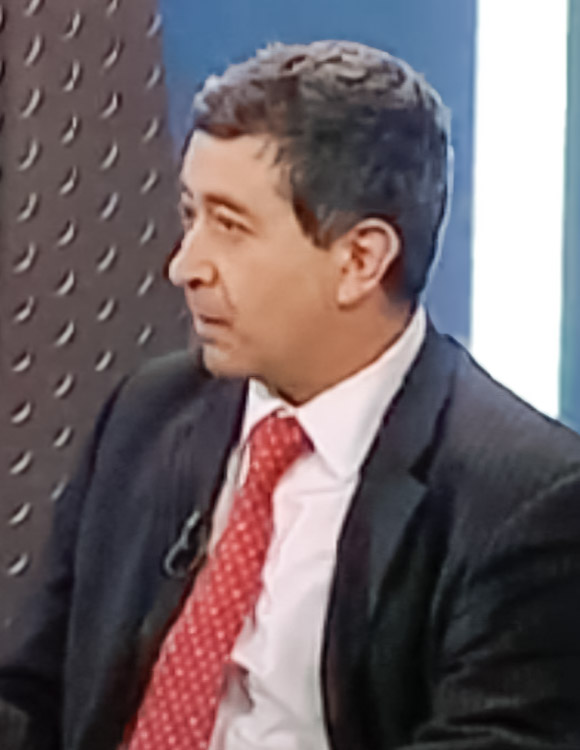

Permanent Representative of Colombia to the Organization of American States
- In office 11 August 2006 – 27 July 2009
- President: Álvaro Uribe
- Preceded by: Álvaro Tirado Mejía
- Succeeded by: Luis Alfonso Hoyos

Minister of National Defence
- In office 19 July 2005 – 19 July 2006
- President: Álvaro Uribe
- Preceded by: Jorge Alberto Uribe
- Succeeded by: Juan Manuel Santos

Personal details
- Born: 23 December 1959 (age 66) Bogotá, D.C., Colombia
- Spouse: Gloria Hoyos
- Children: Valentina Ospina Hoyos; Davis Ospina Hoyos
- Education: Our Lady of the Rosary University (LLB, 1981)
- Profession: Lawyer

Camilo Alfonso Ospina Bernal (born 23 December 1959) is a Colombian lawyer and politician. He served as Permanent Representative of Colombia to the Organization of American States and Minister of National Defence of Colombia in the Administration of President Álvaro Uribe Vélez.
