= María Ángela Holguín =

Colombian politician and diplomat

María Ángela Holguín OSC
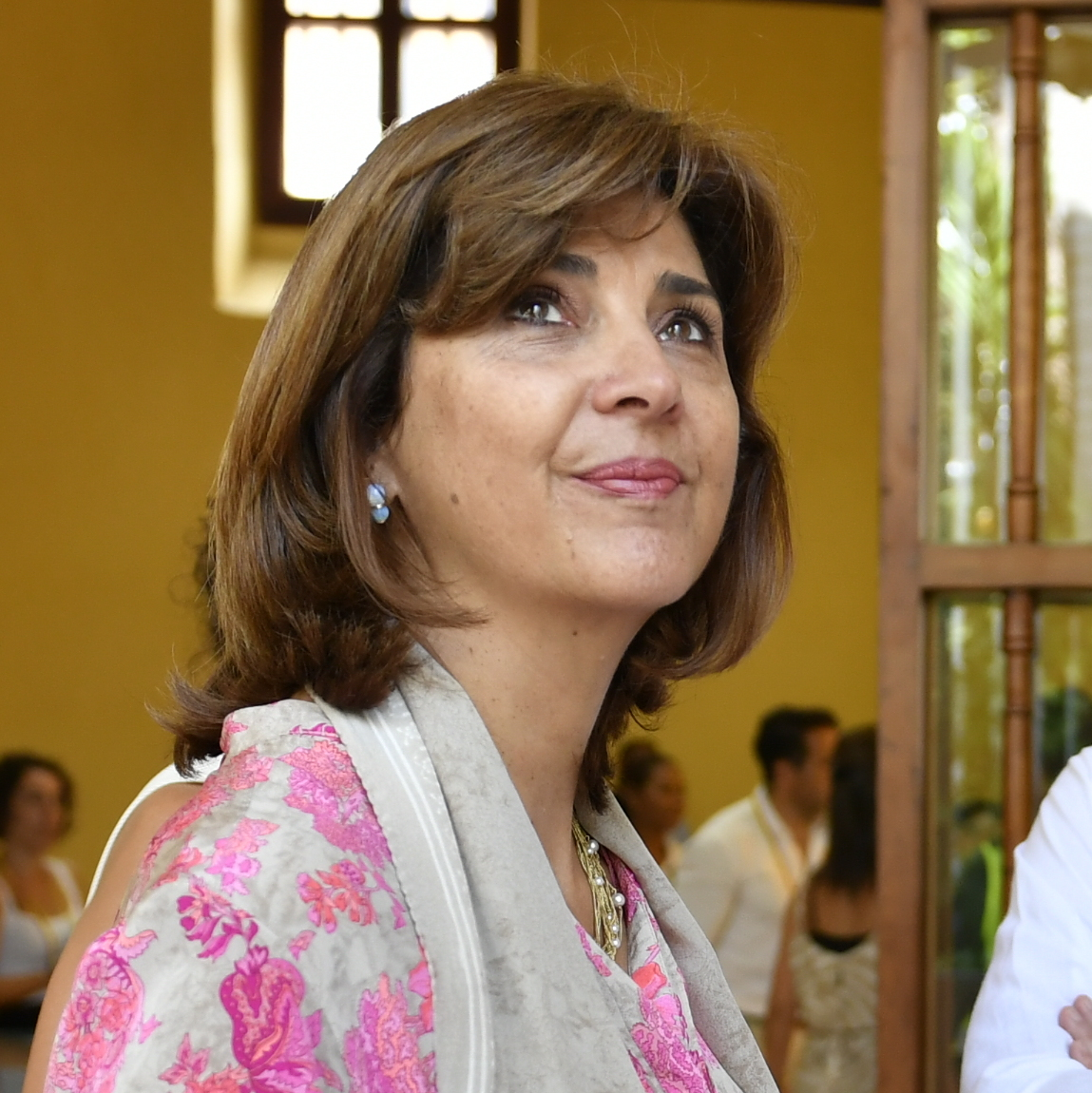

Minister of Foreign Affairs
- In office 7 August 2010 – 7 August 2018
- President: Juan Manuel Santos
- Preceded by: Jaime Bermúdez
- Succeeded by: Carlos Holmes Trujillo

Permanent Representative of Colombia to the United Nations
- In office 16 September 2004 – 11 September 2006
- President: Álvaro Uribe
- Preceded by: Alfonso Valdivieso
- Succeeded by: Claudia Blum

Colombian Ambassador to Venezuela
- In office 16 September 2002 – 20 August 2004
- President: Álvaro Uribe
- Preceded by: Germán Bula Escobar
- Succeeded by: Enrique Vargas Ramírez

Personal details
- Born: María Ángela Holguín Cuéllar; 13 November 1963 (age 62) Bogotá, D.C., Colombia
- Party: Liberal
- Spouse: Santiago Jiménez Mejía (m. 1983; div. 1990)
- Domestic partner: Sergio Fajardo
- Children: 1
- Education: University of the Andes; Center for Diplomatic and Strategic Studies

María Ángela Holguín Cuéllar (born 13 November 1963) is a Colombian politician and diplomat who has been serving as United Nations Secretary-General António Guterres' Personal Envoy on Cyprus since 2024.

Holguín served as the Minister of Foreign Affairs of Colombia from 2010 to 2018. She has also served as the 25th Permanent Representative of Colombia to the United Nations, and as Ambassador of Colombia to Venezuela.

== Early life and education ==
María Ángela Holguín Cuéllar was born on 13 November 1963 to Julio Holguín Umaña and Lucila Cuéllar Calderón. She is related to Carlos and Jorge Holguín Mallarino, briefly appointed as interim presidents of Colombia in the presidential periods of 1888–1892 and 1921–1922 respectively.

Holguín studied at the Gimnasio Femenino school in Bogota, and then studied French at the Université Paris X. She graduated from the University of the Andes in 1988 with a bachelor's degree in political science, and she also completed a specialization there in public management and administrative institutions in 1992.

== Diplomatic career ==
In 2010, while Holguín was serving as Colombia's Representative to CAF – Development Bank of Latin America and the Caribbean in Buenos Aires, the then president-elect Juan Manuel Santos Calderón nominated her to head the Ministry of Foreign Affairs. Holguín's nomination was hailed as a wise political move given the diplomatic problems in the region following the 2008 Andean diplomatic crisis. Holguín's ambassadorship in Venezuela was overall seen as the tacit endorsement that enabled her to tackle the diplomatic détente between the sister nations, while her work with CAF signalled Santos' desire to strengthen ties with the rest of the continent.

Before having taken office, Holguín accompanied president-elect Santos on his first overseas trip after being elected, taking the diplomatic role head on during their meetings with British Prime Minister David Cameron and German Chancellor Angela Merkel. Holguín as Chancellor-designate also headed talks with Venezuelan Chancellor Nicolás Maduro that spearheaded the renewal of diplomatic ties with the neighbouring nation, which were later formalised in a meeting held in Santa Marta between the two Presidents. Holguín then travelled to Ecuador to meet with Ecuadorian Foreign Minister Ricardo Patiño to convince Quito to renew diplomatic ties and to personally invite President Rafael Correa to attend the inauguration, a feat she managed even though Ecuador had an arrest warrant for Santos for his actions as Minister of National Defence of Colombia.

== Other activities ==
- Global Partnership for Sustainable Development Data, Member of the Board of Directors (since 2017)
- Member, Inter-American Dialogue (since 2018)

== Personal life ==
Holguín married Santiago Jiménez Mejía on 27 August 1983 but later divorced having no children. She later met Carlos Espinosa Pérez, with whom she had a son, Antonio, born 23 January 1991.

== See also ==
- List of foreign ministers in 2017

Diplomatic posts
Preceded by Germán Bula Escobar	Colombian Ambassador to Venezuela; 2002–2004	Succeeded by Enrique Vargas Ramírez
Preceded by Alfonso Valdivieso Sarmiento	Permanent Representative of Colombia to the United Nations; 2004–2006	Succeeded by Claudia Blum
Political offices
Preceded by Jaime Bermúdez	Minister of Foreign Affairs of Colombia; 2010–2018	Succeeded by Carlos Holmes Trujillo
