= Superintendency of Residential Public Services (Colombia) =

- Superintendencia de Servicios Públicos Domiciliarios

Agency overview
- Formed: 11 July 1994
- Headquarters: Carrera 18 № 84-35; Bogotá D.C., Colombia; 04°40′12.55″N 74°03′26.66″W
- Annual budget: COP$84,672,906,755 (2012); COP$85,965,562,000 (2013); COP$122,191,000,000 (2014)
- Agency executive: Patricia Duque Cruz, Superintendent
- Parent agency: National Planning Department
- Website: www.superservicios.gov.co

The Superintendency of Residential Public Services (Spanish: Superintendencia de Servicios Públicos Domiciliarios, SSP) is a regulatory agency of the government of Colombia in charge of regulating and overseeing public utility service providers.

== See also ==
- Potable Water and Basic Sanitation Regulation Commission
- Regulatory Agencies and Courts in the South: The Overlaps in Colombian Water Regulation: https://journals.sagepub.com/doi/10.1177/1866802X1300500204
