= Colombia Always =

Political party in Colombia

The Colombia Always (Colombia Siempre) is a national conservative party in Colombia. During the 2002 legislative elections, the party won parliamentary representation, with Germán Vargas Lleras and Nancy Patricia Gutiérrez each winning a seat in the Senate.
