= Óscar Naranjo Trujillo =

Colombian politician (born 1956)

His Excellency Óscar Naranjo
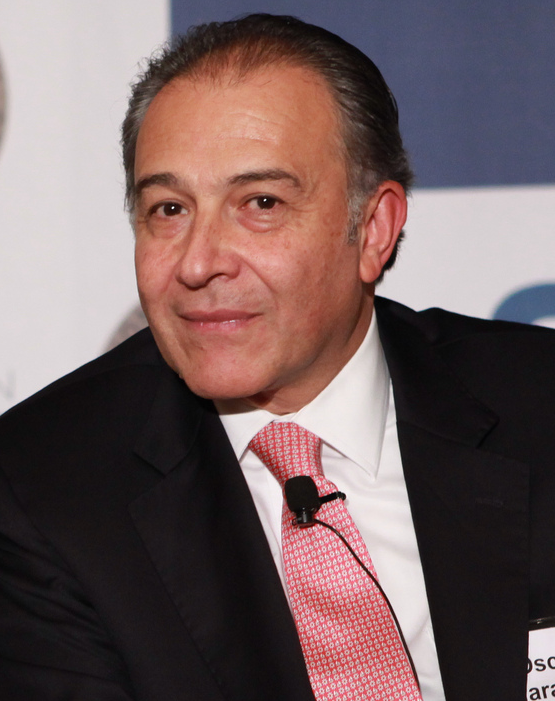

11th Vice President of Colombia
- In office 29 March 2017 – 7 August 2018
- President: Juan Manuel Santos
- Preceded by: Germán Vargas Lleras
- Succeeded by: Marta Lucía Ramírez

High Advisor for Post-Conflict, Human Rights and Security
- In office 2 September 2014 – 24 November 2015
- President: Juan Manuel Santos
- Preceded by: Position established
- Succeeded by: Rafael Pardo Rueda

General of the National Police
- In office 17 May 2007 – 12 June 2012
- President: Alvaro Uribe; Juan Manuel Santos
- Preceded by: Jorge Daniel Castro
- Succeeded by: José Roberto León

Personal details
- Born: Óscar Adolfo Naranjo Trujillo; 22 December 1956 (age 69) Bogotá, Colombia
- Party: Social Party of National Unity
- Spouse: Claudia Luque (m. 1981)
- Children: Marina; María Claudia
- Education: University of La Sabana; Escuela de Guerra Superior

Military service
- Allegiance: Colombia
- Branch/service: National Polica
- Years of service: 1992–2012
- Rank: General
- Commands: Bogotá National Police
- Battles/wars: Colombian Internal Conflict; War on drugs

Óscar Adolfo Naranjo Trujillo (born 22 December 1956) is a Colombian politician, political scientist, administrator and retired general who served as the 11th Vice President of Colombia from 2017 to 2018 under President Juan Manuel Santos. A retired General Naranjo served as General of the National Police from 2007 to 2012 and would later serve as High Advisor for Post-Conflict, Human Rights and Security from 2014 to 2015.

Son of a General of the National Police, Francisco Naranjo. He married Claudia Luque in 1981 and obtained the title of political scientist from the University of La Sabana.

== Biography ==
=== Early life ===
Naranjo was born in Bogotá to Amparo Trujillo and Francisco Naranjo. He completed his high school degree at the Clasanz School in Bogotá, later he would study in Police Administration, as well as a postgraduate degree in Comprehensive Security. In 2009 he received a Diploma in General Management for the National Police at the Institute of Senior Business Management from the University of La Sabana for his high qualifications.

Political offices
Preceded by Germán Vargas Lleras	Vice President of Colombia; 2017–2018	Succeeded by Marta Lucía Ramírez
Preceded by Position established	High Advisor for Post-Conflict, Human Rights and Security; 2014-2015	Succeeded by Rafael Pardo Rueda
Military offices
Preceded by Jorge Daniel Castaño	General of the National Police; 2007–2012	Succeeded by José Roberto León
Order of precedence
Preceded by Germán Vargas Lleras as former vice president	Order of precedence of Colombia former vice president	Succeeded by Marta Lucía Ramírez as former vice president
