= Ministry of Environment, Housing and Territorial Development (Colombia) =

- Ministerio de Ambiente, Vivienda y Desarrollo Territorial

Ministry overview
- Formed: 27 December 2002
- Preceding Ministry: Ministry of Environment
- Dissolved: 4 May 2011
- Superseding Ministry: Ministry of Environment and Sustainable Development Ministry of Housing, City and Territory
- Headquarters: Calle 37 № 8-40; Bogotá, Colombia
- Annual budget: COP$1,598,185,978,560 (2009); COP$1,712,536,013,992 (2010); COP$1,674,654,635,425 (2011)
- Child agencies: IAVH; IDEAM; IIAP; INVEMAR; INDEREMA; National Natural Parks; SINCHI; CRA
- Website: www.minambiente.gov.co

The Ministry of Environment, Housing and Territorial Development (Spanish: Ministerio de Ambiente, Vivienda y Desarrollo Territorial) was a national executive ministry of the Government of Colombia charged with determining and regulating the standards and guidelines for the protection of the environment, the improvement and availability of potable water, and the overseeing of housing, territorial development, and sanitation.

== Ministers ==
Order	Period	Ministers of Environment, Housing and Territorial Development
1st	2002-2003	Cecilia Rodríguez González-Rubio
2nd	2003-2007	Sandra Suárez Pérez
3rd	2006-2009	Juan Francisco Lozano Ramírez
4th	2009-2010	Carlos Costa Posada
5th	2010-2011	Beatriz Elena Uribe Botero
