= Fabio Valencia Cossio =

Colombian lawyer and politician

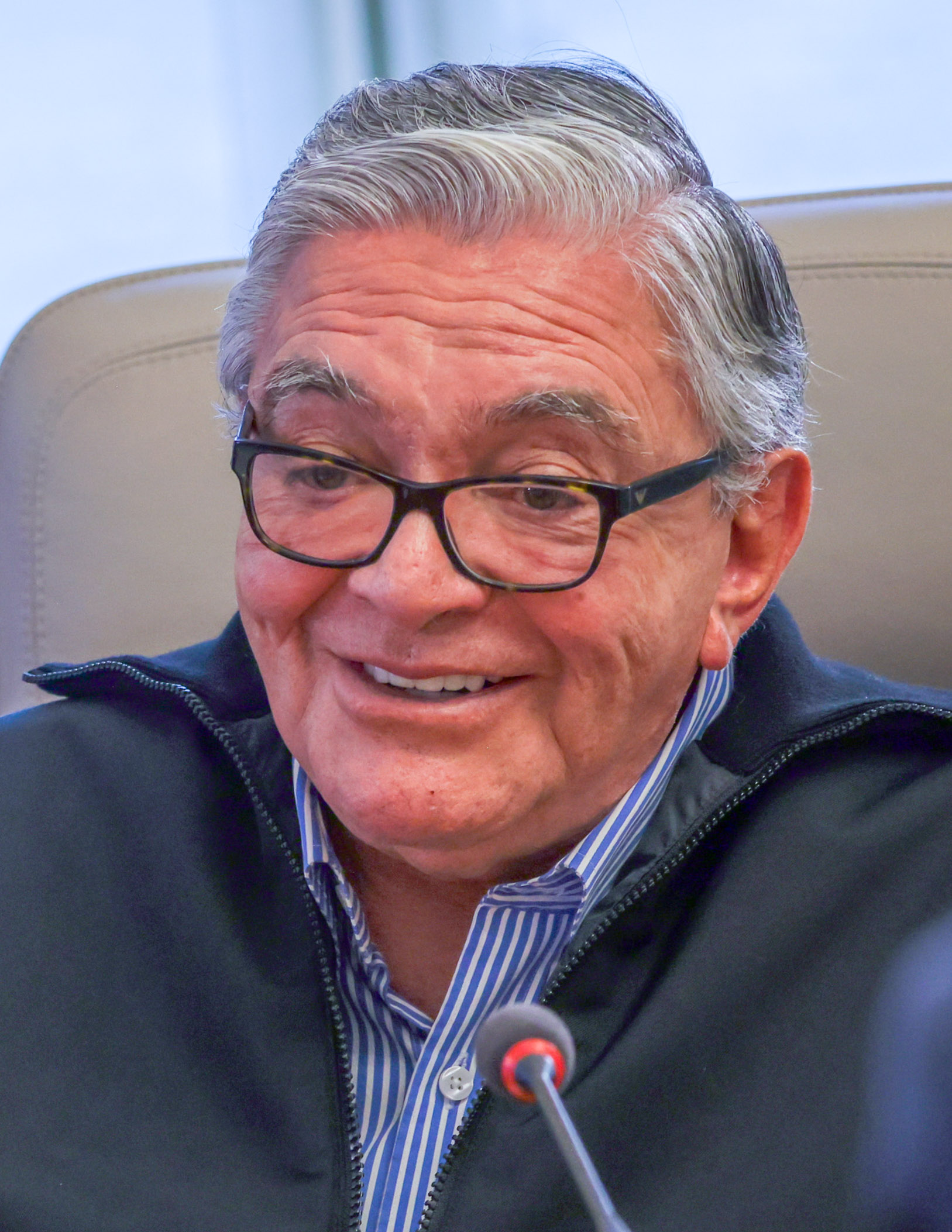
- Valencia in 2024

4th Minister of the Interior and Justice of Colombia
- In office 26 June 2008 – 7 August 2010
- President: Álvaro Uribe Vélez
- Preceded by: Carlos Holguín Sardi
- Succeeded by: Germán Vargas Lleras

Colombia Ambassador to Italy
- In office 28 February 2001 – 8 September 2005
- President: Andrés Pastrana Arango
- Preceded by: Carlos Martínez Simahan
- Succeeded by: Luis Camilo Osorio Isaza

Senator of Colombia
- In office 12 December 1991 – 30 September 1999

President of the Senate of Colombia
- In office 20 July 1998 – 20 July 1999
- Preceded by: Amilkar Acosta Medina
- Succeeded by: Miguel Pinedo Vidal

Member of the Chamber of Representatives of Colombia
- In office 20 July 1982 – 20 July 1990
- Constituency: Antioquia Department

Personal details
- Born: 23 March 1948 (age 78) Medellín, Antioquia, Colombia
- Party: Conservative (1968-present)
- Spouse: María Isabel González Jaramillo (-present)
- Children: Juan Camilo Valencia González; Catalina María Valencia González; Luis Eduardo Valencia González; Santiago Valencia González
- Education: University of Antioquia (LLB)
- Profession: Lawyer

Fabio Valencia Cossio (born 23 March 1948) is a Colombian lawyer and politician. A Conservative party leader and politician, Valencia was first elected to Congress in 1982 as Representative for the department of Antioquia, continuing to be re-elected until 1991 when he successfully ran for Senate, where he rose to national prominence and was elected President of the Senate in 1998. In 2001, President Andrés Pastrana Arango appointed him Ambassador of Colombia to Italy with dual accreditation to Greece, Malta, San Marino, Cyprus, and the United Nations' agencies in Rome. He also served as the 4th Minister of the Interior and Justice of Colombia during the second administration of President Álvaro Uribe Vélez.

== Career ==
=== Ambassadorship ===
On 12 January 2001 President Andrés Pastrana Arango appointed Valencia Ambassador of Colombia to Italy; on 28 February 2001 Valencia presented his Letters of Credence to President of Italy, Carlo Azeglio Ciampi, in a ceremony of protocol at the Quirinal Palace. As Ambassador of Colombia to Italy, Cassio was dually accredited as Non-Resident Ambassador to San Marino, and Malta, and as Permanent Representative the specialized organizations of the United Nations with headquarters in Rome (the Food and Agriculture Organization, the World Food Programme, and the International Fund for Agricultural Development). Valencia presented his Letters of Credence to President of Malta Guido de Marco on 18 October 2001 at the San Anton Palace in Valletta. In 2003, as part of budget cuts in the Ministry of Foreign Affairs, the Embassy of Colombia in Greece was closed, and Valencia was accredited to Greece and Cyprus to fulfil the diplomatic representation to those countries. He presented his credentials to President of Cyprus, Tassos Papadopoulos, on 21 July 2003 at the Presidential Palace in Nicosia.

On 2 June 2005, in recognition of Valencia's meritorious labor as Ambassador to Italy, he awarded the Order of Merit of the Italian Republic in the category of Knight Grand Cross by President Ciampi; he was presented the honor on 20 December by the Resident Ambassador of Italy to Colombia, Antonio Tarelli at the Italian Embassy in Bogotá.

=== Minister of the Interior and Justice ===
On 20 June 2008, President Álvaro Uribe Vélez named Valencia to succeed Carlos Holguín Sardi as Minister of the Interior and Justice of Colombia. Of his designation, Valencia said: "I will dedicate myself to the subject of justice. I would say that the Minister of the Interior and Justice is more like the Minister of Justice and the Interior. I want to [as Minister of the Interior and Justice] institute the harmonious relation, or rather continue to institute the harmonious relationship between the other branches of government, but especially with the judicial branch". Valencia was sworn in as the 4th Minister of the Interior and Justice by President Uribe on 26 June.

== Personal life ==
Valencia was born to Luis Eduardo Valencia García and Elvira Cossio Cuartas on 23 March 1948 in Medellín, Antioquia; he is married to María Isabel González Jaramillo who is a psychologist, and together they have four children: Juan Camilo, Catalina María, Luis Eduardo, and Santiago.

== Selected works ==
- Valencia Cossio, Fabio (1994). Crónicas del Coraje [Chronicles of Courage] (in Spanish). Bogotá: Printer Colombiana. ISBN 978-958-9120-42-2. OCLC 318177116.
- Valencia Cossio, Fabio (1995). Asia: El Futuro [Asia: The Future] (in Spanish). Bogotá: Colombia, Senate of. ISBN 978-958-9077-06-1. OCLC 41313764.

== See also ==
- Luis Carlos Galán Sarmiento
