= Potable Water and Basic Sanitation Regulation Commission =

Government agency in Colombia

- Comisión de Regulación de Agua Potable y Saneamiento Básico

Agency overview
- Formed: 11 July 1994
- Headquarters: Cra 7 № 71-52, Tower B, 4th Floor Bogotá, D.C., Colombia
- Agency executive: Silvia Juliana Yepes Serrano, Executive Director
- Parent agency: Ministry of Housing, City and Territory
- Website: www.cra.gov.co

The Potable Water and Basic Sanitation Regulation Commission (CRA) is a regulatory agency of the Government of Colombia in charge of regulating the water supply and sanitation in Colombia, including the potable and public water distribution, sewage and waste management services. Its mission is to create and preserve the necessary conditions to provide sanitary services by regulating the organizations and agencies that provide this services, may them be public or private; its duties include establishing criteria for granting subsidies to low-income users and using various methods to calculate fix rates. It was created in 1994, and is currently ascribed to the Ministry of Housing, City and Territory.

== See also ==
- Superintendency of Public Services
