= Ministry of Housing, City and Territory (Colombia) =

Government ministry of Colombia

- Ministerio de Vivienda, Ciudad y Territorio

Ministry overview
- Formed: 4 May 2011
- Preceding Ministry: Ministry of Environment, Housing and Territorial Development
- Headquarters: Casa La Botica Carrera 6 № 8-77 Bogotá, D.C., Colombia; 04°35′45.60″N 74°04′33.29″W
- Annual budget: COL$2,261,402,535,544 (2013); COP$1,878,796,341,923 (2014)
- Ministry executive: Minister
- Child agencies: CRA; Fonvivienda; FNA
- Website: www.minvivienda.gov.co

The Ministry of Housing, City and Territory (Spanish: Ministerio de Vivienda, Ciudad y Territorio) is the national executive ministry of Colombia in charge of formulating, implementing, and orienting housing policy, urban planning, and water supply and sanitation services in the country.
