= Carlos Holmes Trujillo =

Colombian politician (1951–2021)

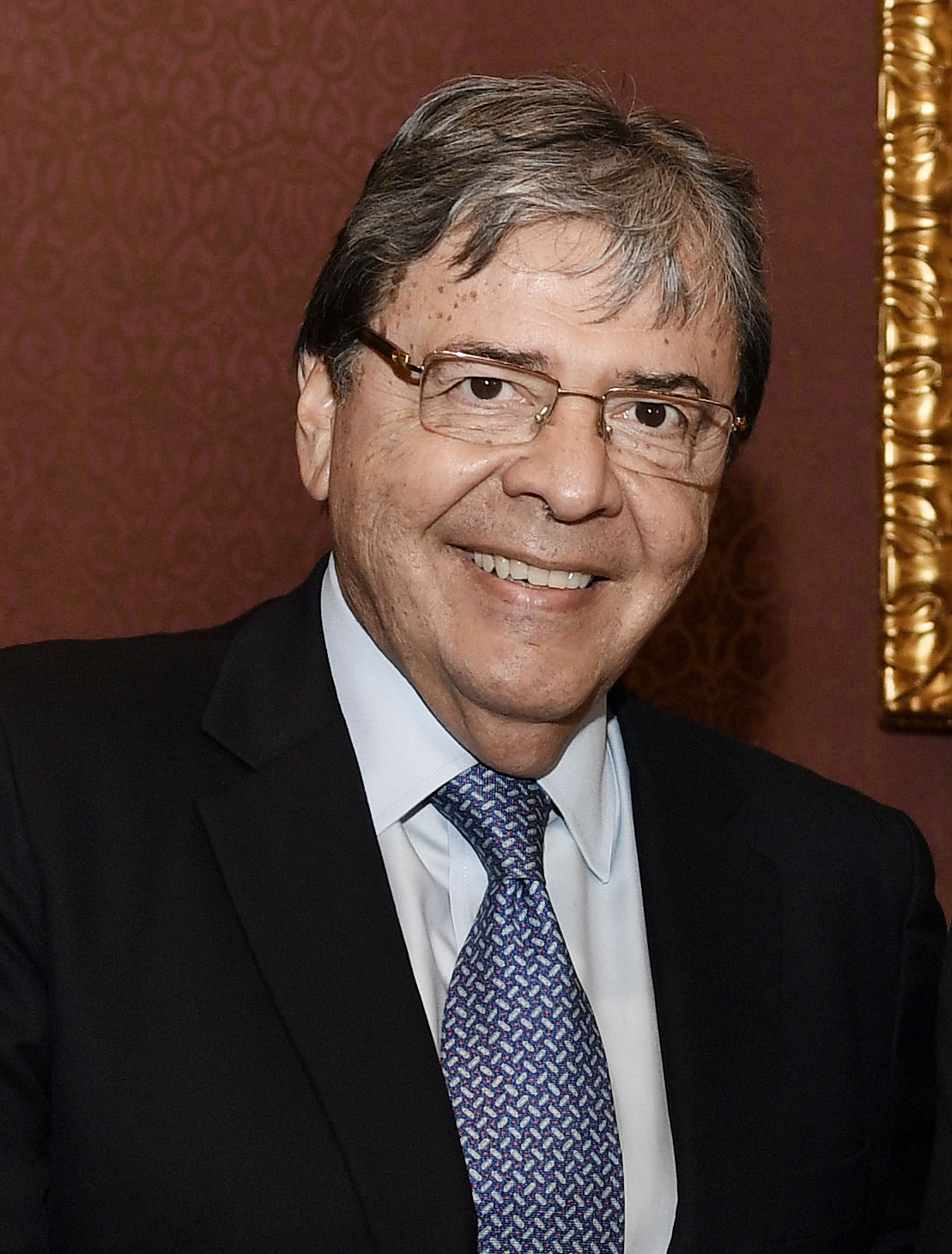

Minister of National Defence
- In office 12 November 2019 – 26 January 2021
- President: Iván Duque
- Preceded by: Guillermo Botero
- Succeeded by: Diego Molano

Minister of Foreign Affairs
- In office 7 August 2018 – 12 November 2019
- President: Iván Duque
- Preceded by: María Ángela Holguín
- Succeeded by: Claudia Blum

Minister of Interior
- In office 7 August 1997 – 28 January 1998
- President: Ernesto Samper
- Preceded by: Horacio Serpa
- Succeeded by: Alfonso López Caballero

Minister of Education
- In office 5 February 1992 – 7 August 1993
- President: César Gaviria
- Preceded by: Alfonso Valdivieso
- Succeeded by: Maruja Pachón

Mayor of Cali
- In office 1 January 1988 – 1 January 1990
- Preceded by: Henry Eder Caicedo
- Succeeded by: Germán Villegas

Personal details
- Born: Carlos Holmes Trujillo García; 23 September 1951 Cartago, Cauca Valley, Colombia
- Died: 26 January 2021 (aged 69) Bogotá, D.C., Colombia
- Party: Democratic Center
- Education: University of Cauca; Sophia University

Carlos Holmes Trujillo García (23 September 1951 – 26 January 2021) was a Colombian dynasty politician, diplomat, scholar, and attorney who served as minister of defense, foreign affairs, interior, and education. He also served as the mayor of Cali and as ambassador to the Organization of American States (OAS), the European Union, and a number of nations.

== Youth and academic career ==
=== Family ===
Trujillo was born in Cartago, Valle del Cauca. He was the elder son of powerful Liberal Party mogul, congressman, diplomat and attorney Carlos Holmes Trujillo Sr. and Genoveva García. His younger brother José Renán was also active in politics until 2008.

=== Education ===
Trujillo received his primary education at the private Liceo Cartago and his high school education at the Pio XII high school in Cali. Following in his father's footsteps, he went to law school at the University of Cauca where he specialized in criminal law. At 25 he was appointed consul in Tokyo, Japan, where he continued his studies and received a master's degree in International Business.

== Early political career ==
=== Return to Colombia ===
After finishing his education in Tokyo, Trujillo returned to Colombia in 1983 and was appointed Cali's Finance Secretary by Mayor Julio Riascos (Conservative Party). After Riascos resigned a year later, Trujillo became director of Colombia's metal federation. Meanwhile, Trujillo made career inside his father's Liberal Party and became the political powerhouse's vice-president.

=== Mayor of Cali ===
Trujillo became Cali's first elected mayor in 1988 and remained in that position until 1990, avoiding confrontations with the Cali Cartel that was becoming increasingly powerful in the city and corrupting much of Cali's public institutions. While formally running the country's third largest city, Trujillo expanded his power by founding the Colombian Federation of Municipalities (FCM) and becoming its chairman.

== National politics ==
=== Minister under a new constitution ===
As FCM chairman and vice-president of the Liberal Party, Trujillo took part in formulating Colombia's 1991 constitution that was part of a peace process with the 19th of April Movement (M-19), a guerrilla group that since 1970 had violently opposed the oligarchical political system of which Trujillo had become a prominent member.

Following elections that same year, President César Gaviria (Liberal Party) appointed Trujillo education minister, a position he held from 1992 until the end of Gaviria's term in 1994.

=== Peace policies and paramilitaries ===
Following that year's election of another liberal President, Ernesto Samper, Trujillo was appointed High Commissioner of Peace. During this two-year period, legal paramilitary groups called CONVIVIR and illegal paramilitary groups like the ACCU teamed up with drug traffickers and the military to brutally combat far-left guerrilla groups like the FARC and the ELN, and assassinate leftist politicians.

=== Proceso 8000 and the OAS ===
The president appointed Trujillo as ambassador to the OAS in the middle of Proceso 8000, a criminal investigation into Cali Cartel Funding of Samper's presidential campaign the year before. The former Cali mayor was called back in 1997 to replace Interior Minister Horacio Serpa who was forced to resign over the scandal. Trujillo held the position until the end of Samper's presidency.

== Diplomatic career ==
Samper's successor, Andrés Pastrana Arango (Conservative Party), took office in 1998 and appointed Trujillo ambassador to Austria. Between 1999 and 2001, Trujillo was ambassador to Russia.

Following a short break, Trujillo was again appointed ambassador for Scandinavia in 2004, this time by President Álvaro Uribe Vélez. A year later, Iceland also became part of Trujillo's diplomatic portfolio.

In 2006, Uribe appointed Trujillo ambassador to the European Union, a post he would hold until a year after the 2010 election of President Juan Manuel Santos.

== Democratic Center ==
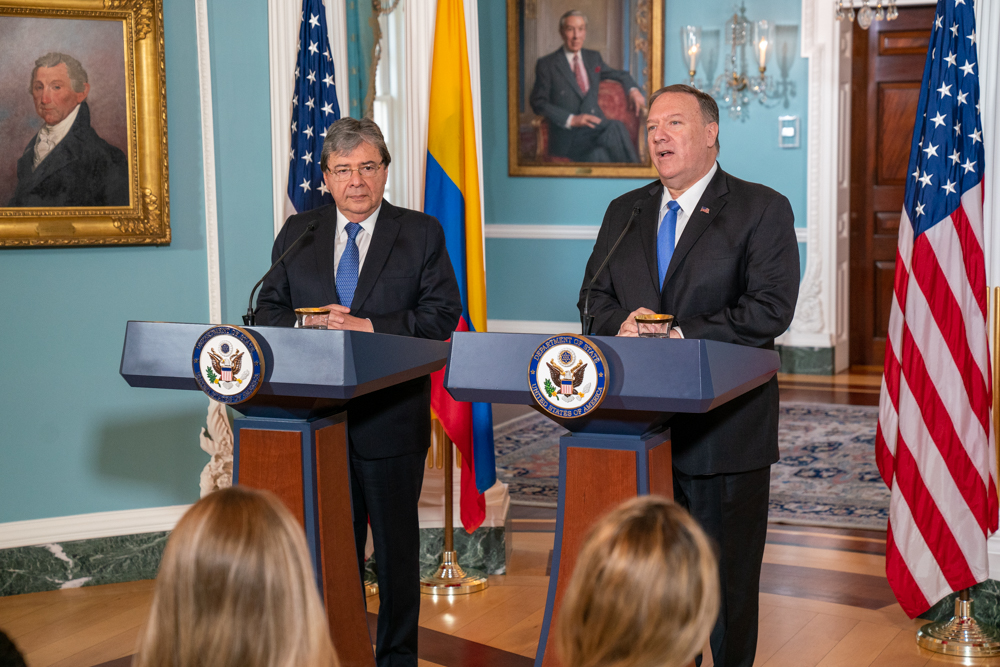
Trujillo (left) speaks to the press with US Secretary of State Mike Pompeo in 2019

Trujillo remained close to Uribe after Santos announced peace talks with the FARC and joined other hard-line politicians like Francisco Santos and Óscar Iván Zuluaga, and far-right politicians like Fernando Londoño and Fabio Valencia Cossio in 2013 to form the "Uribista" Democratic Center (CD) party.

=== "Uribistas" enter Congress ===
Trujillo became Zuluaga's running-mate in opposition to Santos in the 2014 elections, but failed to defeat the incumbent president, who by then was in the middle of peace talks with the FARC that were fiercely opposed by the "Uribistas."

The party did become the fourth largest in Congress and, under the leadership of Uribe in the Senate, became the most important opposition party to Santos, and in particular the peace talks with the guerrillas.

Despite the fierce opposition from both the Democratic Center, conservative media and a large portion of the Colombian public, Santos signed peace with the country's oldest rebel group in November 2016 and kicked off a peace process in December that year.

From Congress, Uribe and his party fiercely opposed the process.

=== Duque presidency ===
Trujillo competed in the 2017 pre-election race to become the "uribista" candidate in 2018, but lost to the relatively unknown Senator Iván Duque, whose political career had begun only four years earlier when he entered the Senate on the CD list.

Duque won the 2018 elections and appointed Trujillo as Minister of Foreign Affairs.

== Death ==
Trujillo tested positive for COVID-19 in January 2021, and was hospitalized in Barranquilla before being transferred to the Central Military Hospital in Bogotá, where he died on the morning of 26 January. His death was announced by Colombian President Ivan Duque in a video posted to Twitter where the president decreed three days of national mourning in the memory of the minister and others who have died from coronavirus. Trujillo was 69 years old.

Political offices
Preceded by María Ángela Holguín	Minister of Foreign Affairs; 2018–2019	Succeeded by Claudia Blum
Preceded by Guillermo Botero Nieto	Minister of National Defence; 2019–2021	Succeeded by Diego Molano Aponte
