= Yesenia Olaya =

Minister of Science, Technology and Innovation of Colombia since 2023

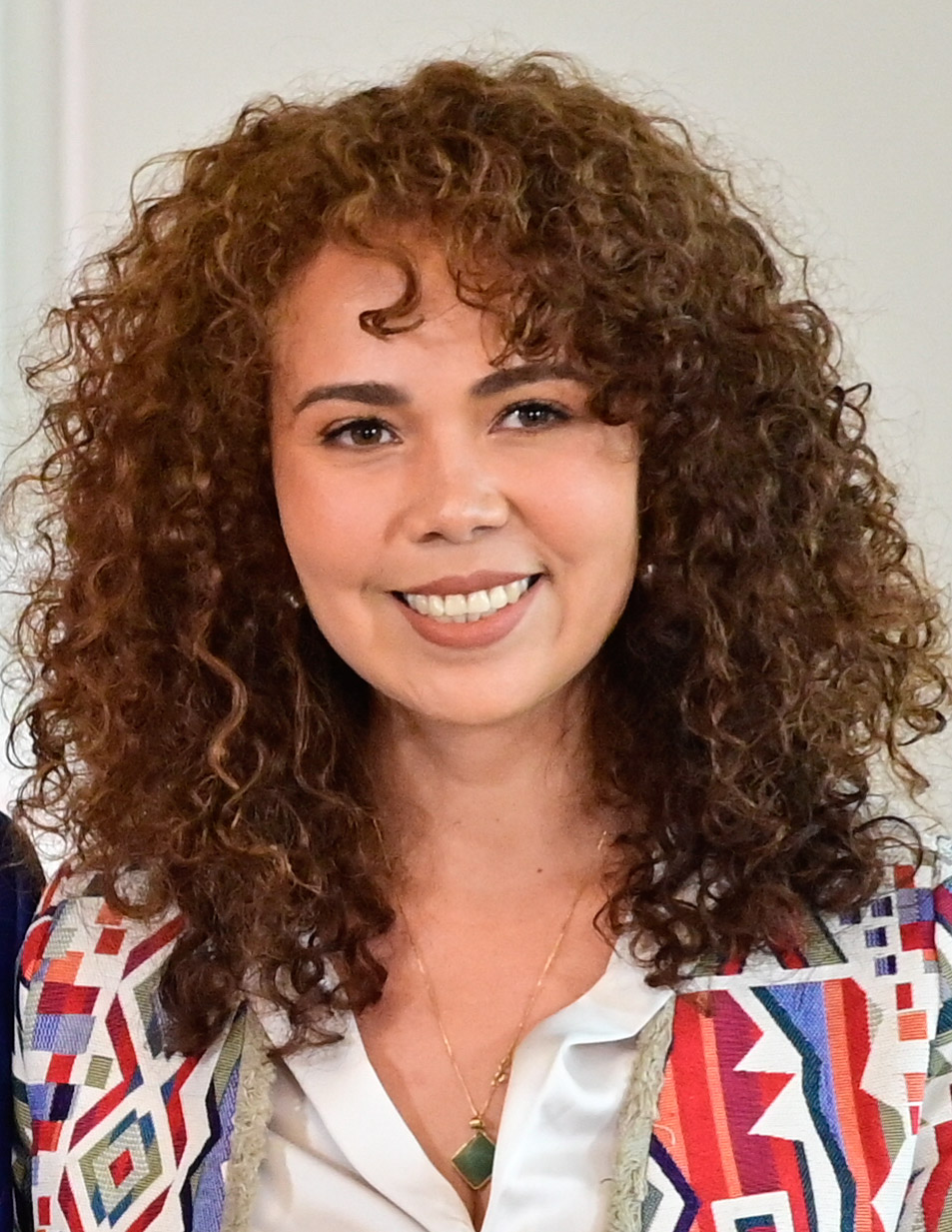

Minister of Science, Technology and Innovation
- In office 1 May 2023 – 7 August 2026
- President: Gustavo Petro
- Preceded by: Arturo Luna
- Succeeded by: Claudia Benavides Salazar

Vice Minister of Talent and Social Appropriation of Knowledge
- In office 10 November 2022 – 1 May 2023
- President: Gustavo Petro
- Preceded by: Ana María Aljure
- Succeeded by: Yoseth Ariza

Personal details
- Born: Ángela Yesenia Olaya Requene; 1990 (age 35–36) Tumaco, Nariño, Colombia
- Party: Independent
- Education: National Autonomous University of Mexico

Ángela Yesenia Olaya Requene is a Colombian academic, sociologist, born in 1990, teacher of pedagogy and doctor in anthropology, graduated from the National Autonomous University of Mexico. In 2019 she served as academic coordinator for the Afro-Latin American Studies Certificate at Harvard University.

Between 10 November 2022, until 1 May 2023, she served as Vice Minister of Talent and Social Appropriation of Knowledge, subsequently from 1 May 2023, she serves as the current Minister of Science, Technology and Innovation, replacing Arturo Luna.

Political offices
Preceded by Ana María Aljure	Vice Minister of Talent and Social Appropriation of Knowledge; 2022–2023	Succeeded by Yoseth Ariza
Preceded by Arturo Luna	Minister of Science, Technology and Innovation; 2023–2026	Succeeded by Claudia Benavides Salazar
Order of precedence
Preceded by Patricia Duque as Minister of Sports	Order of precedence of Colombia as Minister of Science, Technology and Innovation since 1 May 2023	Succeeded by Carlos Rosero as Minister of Equality and Equity
