= Juliana Gutiérrez =

Columbian politician (born 1981)

Minister of Sports
- Incumbent
- Assumed office 7 August 2026
- President: Abelardo de la Espriella (elect)
- Preceded by: Patricia Duque

Personal details
- Born: Juliana Gutiérrez Zuluaga; 1981 (age 44–45) Medellín, Colombia
- Party: Creemos Colombia
- Relations: Federico Gutiérrez (brother)
- Children: 2
- Education: Universidad de Medellín; EAFIT University
- Occupation: Business manager • Politician

Juliana Gutiérrez Zuluaga (born 1981) is a Colombian business manager and politician. In 2026, she was the head of the Senate list for the Creemos Colombia movement, led by her brother Federico Gutiérrez, for the 2026 parliamentary election. In July 2026, she was nominated as Minister of Sports by Abelardo de la Espriella, President-elect of Colombia.

She holds a degree in business administration and a master's in risk management. Gutiérrez has been open about personal challenges, including the death of her son Jerónimo from cancer and a degenerative illness affecting her daughter Alicia, which motivated her social and political involvement.
