= Luis Acosta =

Luis Acosta may refer to:

- Luis Acosta (footballer) (born 1994), Spanish footballer
- Luis Alberto Acosta (born 1952), Uruguayan footballer
- Luis Alfredo Acosta (born c. 1973), Colombian indigenous leader, minister of equality and equity since 2026
- Luis Angel Acosta (born 1948), Mexican swimmer
