= Arturo Luis Luna =

Colombian biologist, biochemist andmicrobiologist

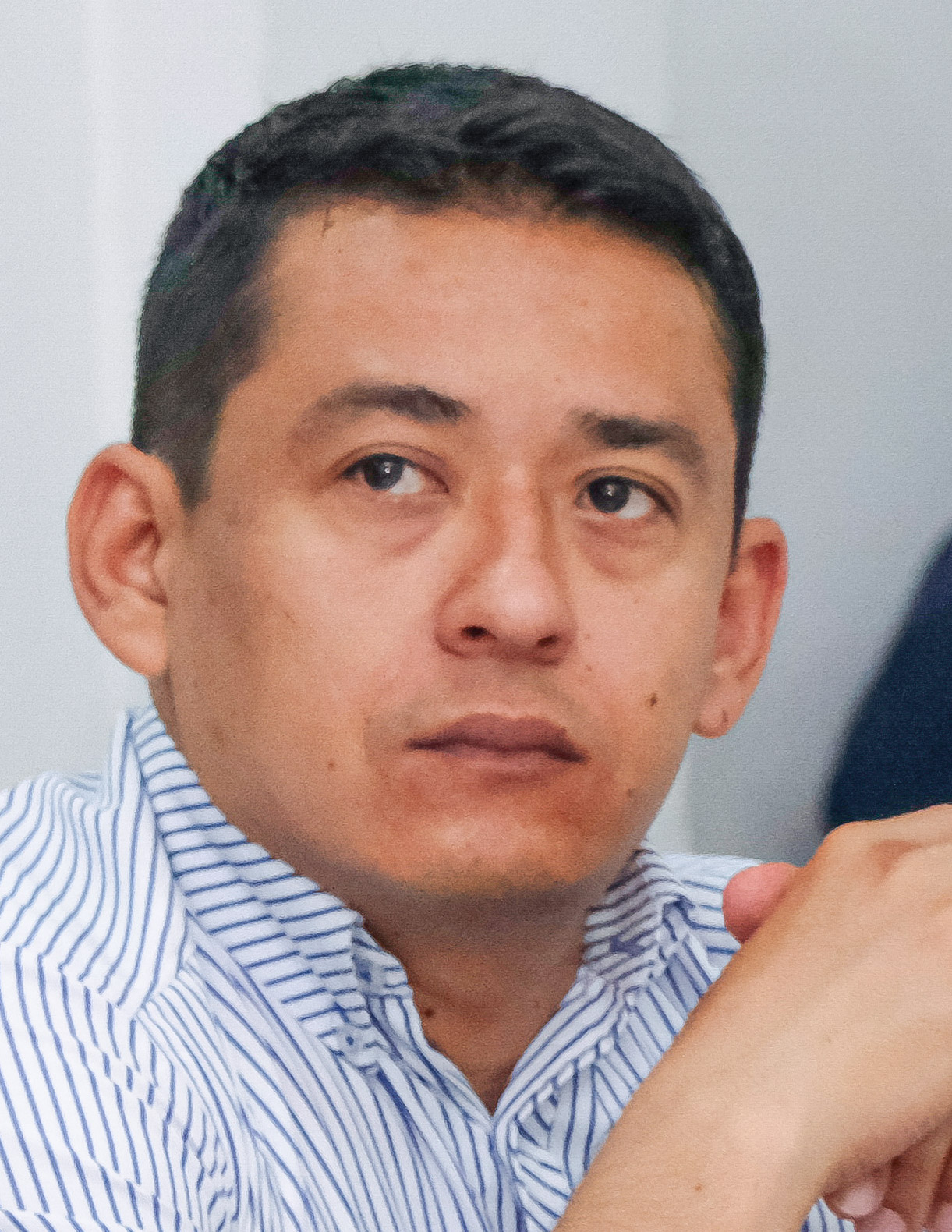

Minister of Science, Technology and Innovation
- In office August 17, 2022 – April 26, 2023
- President: Gustavo Petro
- Preceded by: Tito José Criessen
- Succeeded by: Yesenia Olaya

Personal details
- Born: Arturo Luis Luna Tapia; June 14, 1984 (age 42) Ovejas, Sucre, Colombia
- Party: Humane Colombia
- Education: University of Sucre; National University; University of Tennessee; Louisiana State University

Arturo Luis Luna Tapia (born June 14, 1984) is a Colombian biologist, biochemist, immunologist, microbiologist, biotechnologist, biomedical doctor, parasitologist and scientist. Having served from August 17, 2022 to April 26, 2023 as Minister of Science, Technology and Innovation, during the Administration of Gustavo Petro.

== Early life ==
Arturo Luis Luna Tapia was born on June 14, 1984 in the Flor del Monte district located in the municipality of Ovejas, Sucre in northern Colombia. His father was a farmer and merchant, his mother was a peasant and an illiterate housewife. Luna has six siblings, one of them a woman. During his youth he had to suffer the violence unleashed by the paramilitaries in his region and experience up close acts of extreme violence that affected some of his family and friends, such as the El Salado massacre.

=== Studies ===
At the beginning of 2002 he moved to the city of Sincelejo to carry out his university studies at the University of Sucre where he studied biology with an emphasis on Biotechnology and Biomedicine. He applied for a Fulbright scholarship and after obtaining it, he traveled in 2011 to the United States to study at Louisiana State University and in 2015 he moved to the University of Tennessee in the city of Memphis where he completed his studies and obtained a doctorate in Biomedical Sciences with an emphasis in Microbiology, Immunology, Biochemistry.

In this institution he carried out his postdoctoral studies in a research of the Department of Clinical Pharmacy and Translational Science. He also obtained a specialization in Public Management from the Higher School of Public Administration (ESAP).

=== Professional life ===
During the time he lived in the United States, Luna carried out multiple studies in the field of biotechnology and biomedicine. He served as research chair of the Louisiana State University Department of Microbiology, Immunology, and Parasitology and the Integrated Biomedical Sciences Program, Department of Clinical Pharmacy, Division of Experimental Clinical Therapies, and the University of Tennessee School of Pharmacy.

Luna continued to live and work in the United States until 2018 when his father died and he decided to return to Colombia. From February 14, 2019 to June 19, 2022, he served as Manager of Science and Technology of the Ministry of Science, Technology and Innovation.

On August 14, 2022, he was appointed Minister of Science, Technology and Innovation of his country by President Gustavo Petro. He took office on the 17th of the same month.

Political offices
Preceded by Tito José Criessen	Minister of Science, Technology and Innovation; 2022–2023	Succeeded by Yesenia Olaya
Order of precedence
Preceded by María Isabel Urrutia as Former Minister of Sports	Order of precedence of Colombia as Former Cabinet Member	Succeeded by María Paula Correa as Former Chief of Staff of the Presidency
