= Paola Holguín =

Colombian politician (born 1973)

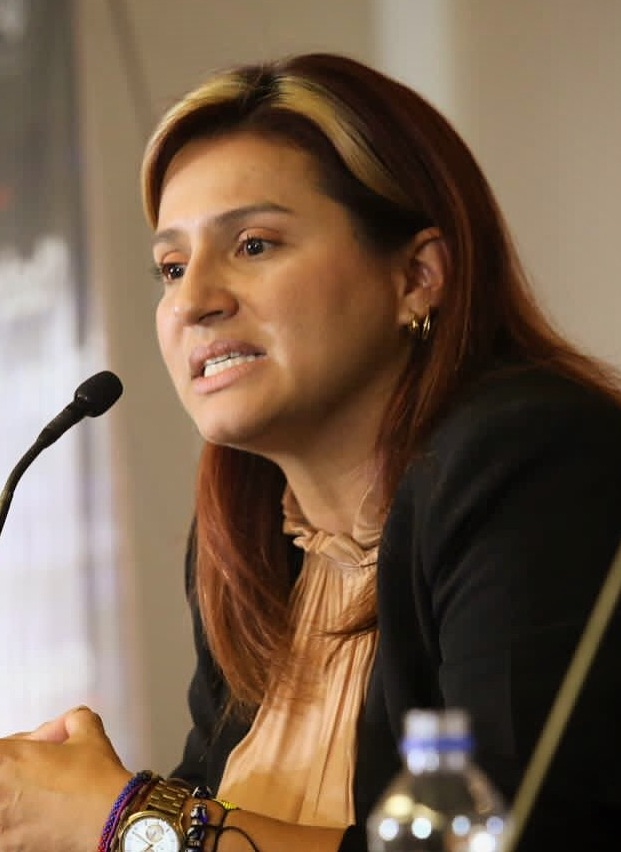
- Holguín in 2017

Minister of Culture
- Incumbent
- Assumed office 7 August 2026
- President: Abelardo de la Espriella
- Preceded by: Yannai Kadamani

Member of the Senate
- In office 20 July 2014 – 18 June 2026

Advisor to the Presidency of Mexico
- In office October 2011 – November 2012
- President: Felipe Calderón

Advisor to the Presidency of Colombia
- In office August 2003 – 7 August 2010
- President: Álvaro Uribe
- Preceded by: José Obdulio Gaviria
- Succeeded by: Advisory team

Personal details
- Born: Paola Andrea Holguín Moreno; 11 November 1973 (age 52) Medellín, Colombia
- Party: Democratic Centre (2013–2026)
- Education: Pontifical Bolivarian University
- Occupation: Journalist • Politician

Paola Andrea Holguín Moreno (born 11 November 1973) is a Colombian politician currently serving as Minister of Culture since August 2026 under Abelardo de la Espriella, previously serving as a member of the Senate from 2014 until 2026. She served as advisor to president Álvaro Uribe from 2003 to 2008 and from 2009 to 2010.
