= Paula Marcela Moreno Zapata =

Colombian engineer and politician

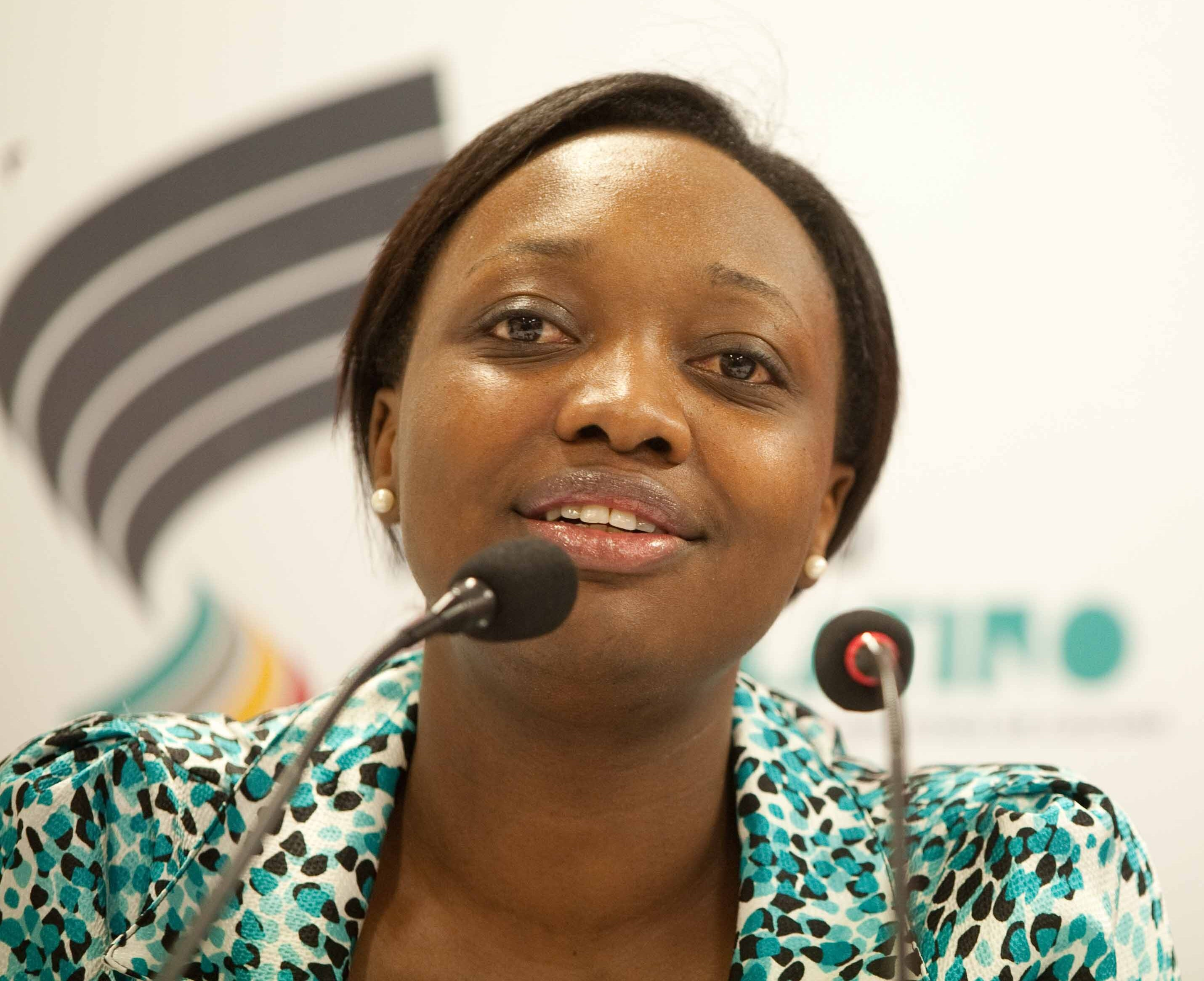
- Moreno in 2010

8th Minister of Culture of Colombia
- In office 1 June 2007 – 7 August 2010
- President: Álvaro Uribe Vélez
- Deputy: Enzo Ariza Ayala
- Preceded by: María Elvira Cuervo
- Succeeded by: Mariana Garcés Córdoba

Personal details
- Born: 11 November 1978 (age 48) Bogotá, D.C., Colombia
- Education: Autonomous University of Colombia (BSc); Cambridge University (MPhil)
- Profession: Industrial engineer

Paula Marcela Moreno Zapata (born 11 November 1978) is a Colombian engineer, professor, philanthropist, and politician. She served as the 8th Minister of Culture of Colombia under President Álvaro Uribe Vélez from 10 May 2007 to 7 August 2010. Moreno made history as the first Afro-Colombian woman and the youngest person to hold a Cabinet position in Colombia.

Throughout her career, Moreno has been dedicated to promoting cultural and social initiatives. She is the president of Corporación Manos Visibles (Visible Hands Corporation), an organization committed to supporting social and cultural projects that empower marginalized communities. Additionally, she serves on the boards of the Ford Foundation and the African Diaspora World Association (ASWAD) and is an active member of the Inter-American Dialogue, which fosters collaboration and dialogue across the Americas.

Moreno is also a Hubert H. Humphrey Fellow in the Special Program for Urban and Regional Studies at the Massachusetts Institute of Technology (MIT). This non-degree fellowship provides professionals with opportunities for development through courses, conferences, networking, and hands-on experiences during a year-long program. Most recently Moreno is a fellow of the Skoll Foundation.

== Background ==
Moreno Zapata was born on 11 November 1978, in Bogotá, Colombia. Her family originates from the Cauca department, where some of her relatives still reside. She completed her high-school education at Colegio Departamental Silveria Espinosa de Rendón and later pursued a Bachelor of Science degree in Industrial Engineering at the Autonomous University of Colombia, graduating in 2001. During this time, she also studied Italian at the Istituto Italiano di Cultura from 1996 to 1998, earning a degree in Italian Language and Culture.

After graduation, Moreno moved to Italy, where she attended the University for Foreigners in Perugia. Upon returning to Colombia, she received a scholarship from the Autonomous University of Colombia and COLFUTURO, enabling her to study at the University of Cambridge. In 2004, she graduated with a Master of Philosophy degree in Management Studies.

In 2010, Moreno was awarded a Hubert H. Humphrey Fellowship in the Special Program for Urban and Regional Studies (SPURS) at the Massachusetts Institute of Technology (MIT), where she focused on urban development and at-risk youth. Four years later, in 2014, she was selected as a Yale World Fellow, joining a prestigious program for global leaders at Yale University.

== Career ==
Moreno is the President of Manos Visibles, a Colombian NGO. She also serves as a board member at the Ford Foundation, the Inter-American Dialogue and Association for the study of the Worldwide African Diaspora ASWAD. She had previously been working in the academic and development fields before being appointed as Minister of Culture. She was national coordinator, project manager and consultant of several development agencies, such as UNESCO, Panamerican Health Organization (PAHO), as well of community organizations and the Ministry of Interior in Colombia. At the same time, she was researcher at the Center of Latin American Studies at the University of Cambridge, Assistant Professor in the Engineering Department at the Autonomous University, and a Consultant for the Management Studies Department at the University of the Andes.

=== Minister of Culture ===
Moreno was appointed on 10 May 2007 as the new Minister of Culture of Colombia by President Álvaro Uribe Vélez. President Uribe was quick to point out Moreno's qualifications, and on 1 June 2007 Uribe swore in Moreno as the 8th Minister of Culture in a ceremony that took place at the Office of the Presidency of Colombia. She was the first Afro-Colombian woman to ever hold a cabinet as well as the youngest person to do so, and the fourth person of Afro-Colombian descent to be a cabinet minister in the history of Colombia.

During her time in office, her most important and visible work centered around the legislative agenda, three new laws were approved by congress for the heritage, national system of libraries, and the protection of native languages. Additionally, the advancement in national cultural policies by two new state policies for historical centers, and cultural industries and the first compendium of cultural policies. She started new national plans, such as the National Plan for Dance and the National Audiovisual Plan; more than 20 new plans and programs were created in this period.

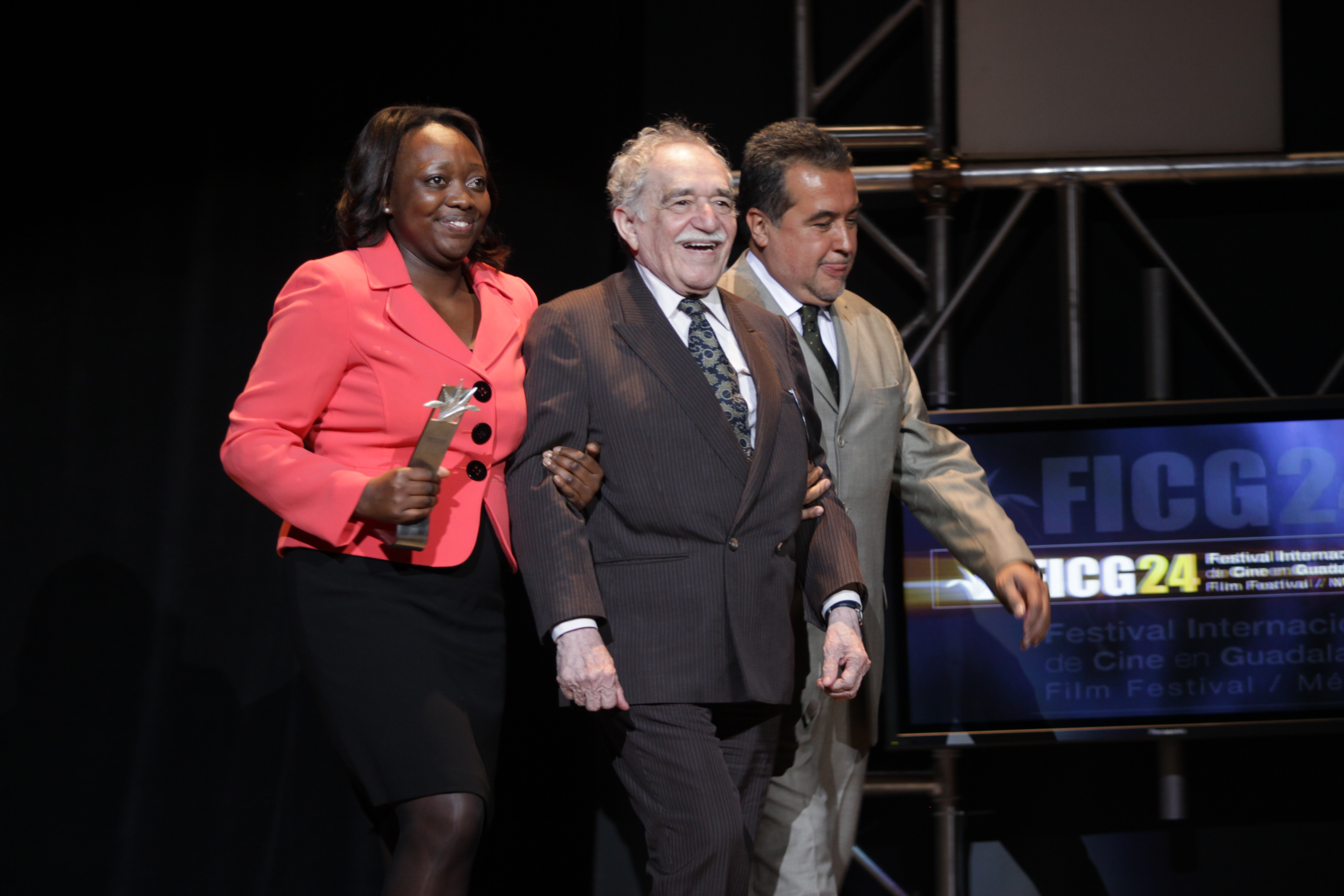
Moreno and Gabriel García Marquez at the 2009 Guadalajara International Film Festival

One of the most visible and recognized work that Moreno led was around the international agenda for Colombia. The country had major spots at international events such the Guadalajara bookfare and film festivals, the Conference for the Afrodescendant Agenda for the Americas in 2008, and the Iberoamerican Congress for Culture in 2010. At the national level, she led the bicentennial anniversary of the Independence of Colombia that took place in 2010. In addition, for three years the Ministry of Culture organized the National Grand Concert, a massive live concert that took place in 1102 municipalities of Colombia and 44 embassies around the world, and broadcast in national television with an audience of more than 10 million Colombians, with the participation of more than a 200,000 artists performing in different stages across the country, and included artist such as Carlos Vives, Juanes and Shakira, as well as folkloric dance and music groups that represented all of the variations of music and dances of Colombia. Paula Moreno is the President of Visible Hands Foundation and advisor of international agencies.

=== Visible Hands ===
Visible Hands (Spanish: Manos Visibles) is a Colombian NGO funded in 2010 by Moreno and Colombian leaders Hernan Bravo and Patricia Alvarez. Its main aim is to promote effective social inclusion and integration in Colombia by empowering grassroots leaders to change the power relations in Colombia. In particular, the Visible Hands are leaders and organizations that promote self-inclusion and work for peacebuilding in the most violent and vulnerable areas in Colombia. Manos Visibles has impacted more than 27,000 people and 500 organizations over fifteen years and has a global leadership network within the African diaspora. This network integrates more than 500 leaders and organizations, including top universities, Colombian leaders, and the media. Visible Hands is funded by BBVA, the Ford Foundation, the Avina Foundation, and the National Endowment for Democracy, among other national and international organizations. The main programs of Visible Hands are the Youth and Peace Building Fund, the Pacific Power Program, DALE, and the Development Management Executive Program.

== Honors ==
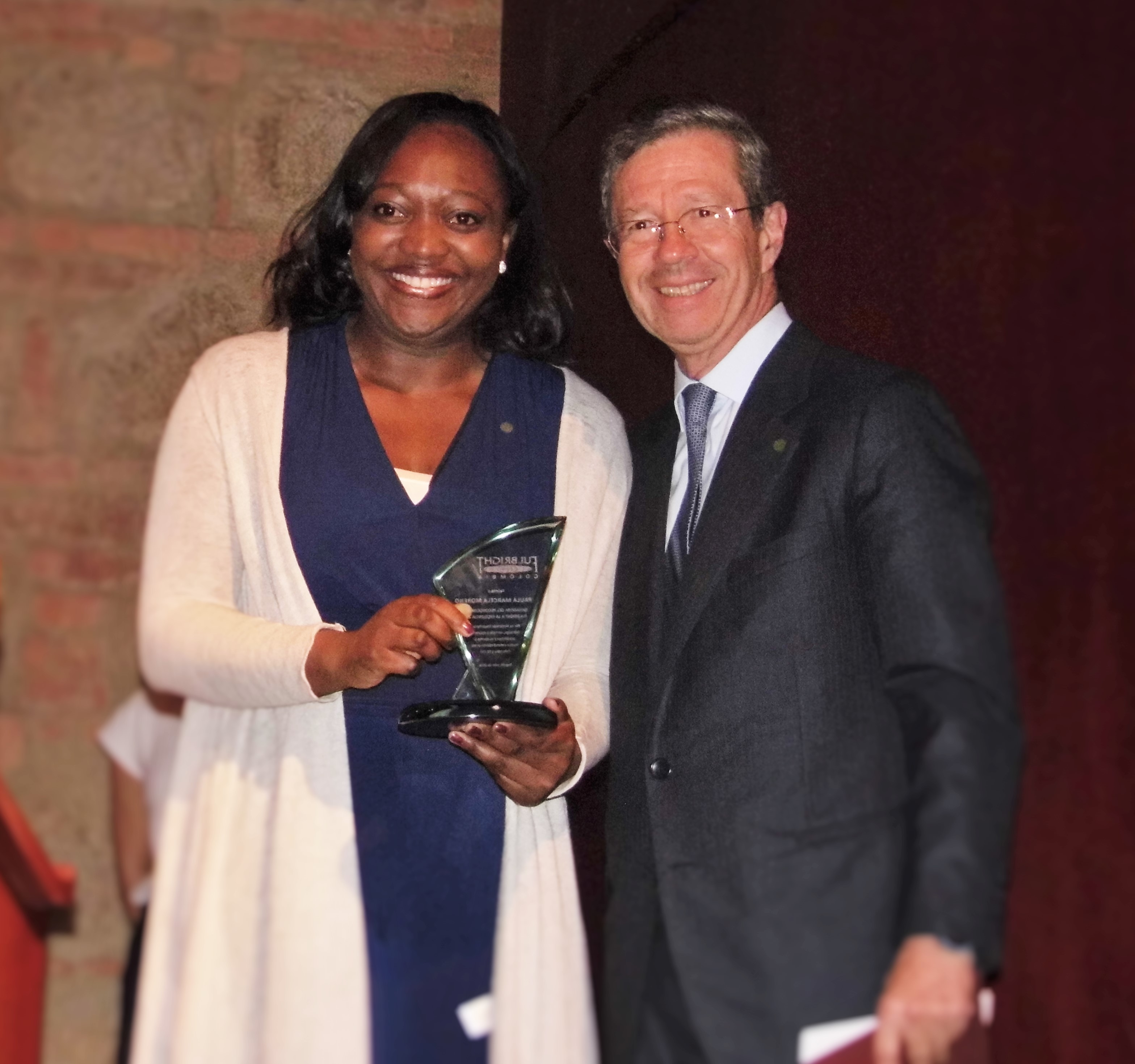
Moreno receiving the Fulbright Excellence Award

- Order of San Carlos (2010). For service to the Government of Colombia and the nation as Minister of Culture, awarded by President Alvaro Uribe.
- Order of the Aztec Eagle (2011). Awarded by President of Mexico, Felipe de Jesús Calderón Hinojosa, for contribution to the improvement of Colombia/Mexico relations during her term as Minister of Culture.
- Unita Blackwell Award (2009). The National Conference of Black Mayors of the United States as one of the most prominent Black leaders in the world.
- Council of the Americas (2010). One of the most influential young leaders in Latin América for effectively understanding diversity.
- BBC (2014) 100 Women
- Fulbright Excellence Award (2014). United States Government - Fulbright Commission
- MIPAD - United Nations (2016). 100 top Afrodescendants leaders in the world under 40
- World Economic Forum's Schwab Foundation (2018). Nominee for Social Entrepreneurship by the work of Manos Visibles (Visible Hands).
- Global Fairness Award (2019)
- UK Black Excellence Award (2020)
- Skoll World Forum Fellows (2023)

== Publications ==
- Monthly Column - El Tiempo, Colombia's leading newspaper. More than 100 columns over 15 years
- The Power of the Invisible: A Memoir of Solidarity, Humanity and Resilience (2018). Penguin Random House.
- Soñar lo imposible (September 2022).Penguin Random House.
- Diasporic Futures (Manos Visibles)
- Memorias de una gestión pública en cultura. Colombia diversa: Cultura de todos, Cultura para todos. Colombia: Ministerio de Cultura, República de Colombia. (2010).
- "Biodiversity Management: A Current Trace of the African Diaspora". (September 2006) Perspectives on Global Development and Technology 5(3):197-211
- "Afro-Colombians: the different meanings of the African diaspora". Encyclopaedia of the African Diaspora: Origins, Experiences, and Culture, (July 2008; 1st ed). Santa Barbara, California
- An organisational approach to the biodiversity management by local communities in developing countries. Francoise Barbira - Freeman. Cambridge: Judge Institute of Management Studies. (2005).

== Selected works ==
- An organizational approach to the biodiversity management by local communities in developing countries (PDF). Francoise Barbira -Freeman. Cambridge: Judge Institute of Management Studies. 2005. Archived from the original (PDF) on 22 July 2011.
- "Biodiversity Management: A Current Trace of the African Diaspora". Perspectives on Global Development and Technology. Vol. 5, Nº3. Boston: Leiden. 2006. pp. 197–211. ISSN 1569-1500. OCLC 201719995.
- Memorias de una gestión pública en cultura. Colombia diversa: Cultura de todos, Cultura para todos., Colombia: Ministry of Culture, 2010

== See also ==
- Juan José Nieto Gil
- Luis Antonio Robles
- Josefina Valencia Muñoz
