= National Poetry Award =

National Poetry Award may refer to:

- National Poetry Award (Colombia)
- National Poetry Award (Spain)

== See also ==
- Bruce Dawe National Poetry Prize, Australia
- National Book Award for Poetry, United States
- List of poetry awards
