= Yannai Kadamani =

Colombian government official (born 1993)

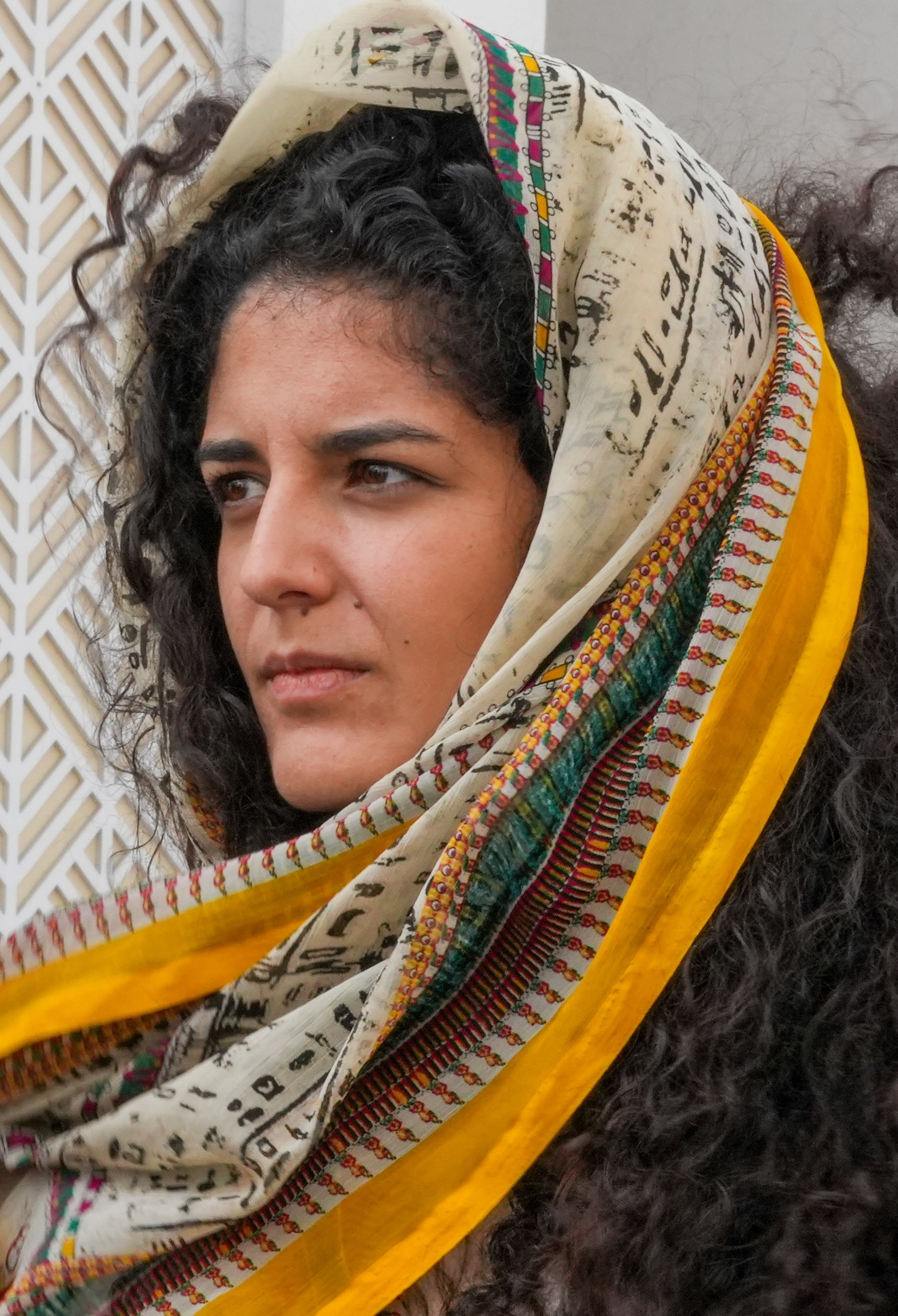
- Kadamani in February 2025

Minister of Culture
- In office February 27, 2025 – August 7, 2026
- President: Gustavo Petro
- Preceded by: Juan David Correa
- Succeeded by: Paola Holguín

Deputy Minister of Arts and the Cultural and Creative Economy
- In office October 25, 2024 – February 27, 2025
- President: Gustavo Petro
- Preceded by: Jorge Zorro
- Succeeded by: Fabián Sánchez

Personal details
- Born: Yannai Kadamani Fonrodona; February 18, 1993 (age 33) Bogota, D.C., Colombia
- Party: Independent
- Education: Francisco José de Caldas District University (BA); National University of Costa Rica (MA)
- Profession: Political; scientist; artist; dancer; professor

Yannai Kadamani Fonrodona (born February 18, 1993) is a Colombian dancer, professor, artist and politician who served as Minister of Culture from 2025 to 2026 under President Gustavo Petro. She previously served as Deputy Minister of Arts and the Cultural and Creative Economy.

Born in Bogotá, D.C., Kadamani studied art at the Francisco José de Caldas District University and later earned a master's degree in performing arts from the National University of Costa Rica. Kadamani is the tenth female Minister of Culture after Patricia Ariza in 2022 as well as the first of Lebanese descent.

== Early life, education and career ==
Kadamani was born in Bogotá, D.C., on February 18, 1993. Her father is of Lebanese descent. She studied performing arts at the Superior Academy of Arts of Bogotá of the Francisco José de Caldas District University, where she earned a bachelor's degree in performing arts. She later pursued a master's degree in dance at the National University of Costa Rica.

In 2018, she served as coordinator for the Kamentsa Biya Sibundoy Council and later as a cultural manager for the Community Dance Chamber.

In September 2023, she began working at the Ministry of Culture, initially with the Dance Group of the Arts Directorate. Later, in October 2024, she was appointed Deputy Minister of Arts and the Cultural and Creative Economy, a position she held until February 2025.

Her appointment as Minister of Culture came in February 2025, when the president initially designated her to fill the vacancy on a temporary basis following the resignation of Juan David Correa. She was officially sworn in as minister on February 27, 2025.

Political offices
Preceded by Jorge Zorro	Deputy Minister of Arts and the Cultural and Creative Economy; 2024-2024	Succeeded by Fabián Sánchez
Preceded by Juan David Correa	Minister of Culture; 2025–2026	Succeeded by Paola Holguín
