= Pierre Raymond =

- Born: Pierre Marcel Jacques Raymond; 24 January 1946; Paris, France
- Citizenship: French-Colombian
- Education: Sorbonne
- Occupations: Sociologist, economist, professor, writer
- Website: http://www.colombiarural.info/

Pierre Raymond is a social scientist who has been living in Colombia since 1979, and has been working on the country's rural problems. He has undertaken in Colombia, his adopted country, several studies of rural economy, sociology and history. He also has been teaching at university subjects related to these topics to students in economics, rural development and forestry.

One of the research works he has completed in the Santander department, concerns a traditional cottage industry which was then about to fall in disuse. It relates the history of cotton growing and textile production. It gives an overview of the agronomic, economic and social aspects of this activity and describes the traditional techniques of spinning and weaving. It all started while undertaken field work on another investigation (traditional production of sugar cane and brown sugar), he accidentally met three old ladies that were processing cotton fibre by ancient techniques.

The results of this research were published in three places (two editions of " Vida y muerte del algodón y los textiles santandereanos ", Universidad Javeriana, 1981, new and revised edition, editorial Ecoe, 1989; " Historia del algodón en Santander ", Banco de la República, 1990). Later on, two other researchers studied other aspects of the local textile production and new information was thus published. (Beatriz Granados: « Visión Histórico Cultural del Trabajo Textil en Charalá », Colcultura, 1991 and « Tejidos Charaleños », Colcultura, 1994; Beatriz Devia (« Colores de la Naturaleza para el Algodón », Fondo FEN, 1996).

These researches caught the attention of a Belgian NGO social worker, who then undertook a first effort to revive the homemade production of cotton fabric as part of the programme of adapted rural education. Later on, a German NGO known in Colombia as "Pan para el Mundo" took over this endeavour. This organization accompanied for several years efforts to improve the quality and diversity of homemade cotton products. It also helped to form an organization of people involved in the cultivation of cotton plants and in textile production, now known as the " Corporación de Recuperación Comunera del Lienzo " (Corporation for the Revival of the Traditional Cotton Textiles).

== Publications ==
- Vida y muerte del algodón y los tejidos Santandereanos. 1982. Reprint in 1987.
- El Lago de Tota ahogado por la Cebolla. 1990
- Historia del Algodón en Santander. 1990
- El Conflicto Social en Charalá. 1992
- Hacienda tradicional y aparcería. 1997
- Mucha tela que cortar: la saga de una fábrica textil y la pugna de las familias Caballero y López por su control (2008, Planeta).

Most texts can be downloaded in the section "Publicaciones" of www.colombiarural.info/
