= Revista Colombiana de Química =

- Discipline: Chemistry
- Language: Spanish
- Edited by: Oscar Rodriguez Bejarano

Publication details
- History: 1971-present
- Publisher: National University of Colombia (Colombia)
- Frequency: Triannual
- Open access: Yes
- License: Creative Commons Attribution 3.0 Unported

Standard abbreviations
- ISO 4: Rev. Colomb. Quím.

Indexing
- CODEN: RCLQAY
- ISSN: 0120-2804
- LCCN: 73646762
- OCLC no.: 645106861

Links
- Journal homepage; Online access; Online archive

The Revista Colombiana de Química (English: Colombian Journal of Chemistry) is an open access peer-reviewed scientific journal on chemistry published by the National University of Colombia. It publishes original contributions of applied and basic research on chemistry, including analytical, organic, inorganic, bio-, and physical chemistry. Articles are published in Spanish, with abstracts translated into English and Portuguese.

== Abstracting and indexing ==
The Revista Colombiana de Química is abstracted and indexed in Chemical Abstracts, Scopus, SciELO, Latindex, and Publindex (category A2).
