= Jorge Zorro =

Colombian musician (born 1947)

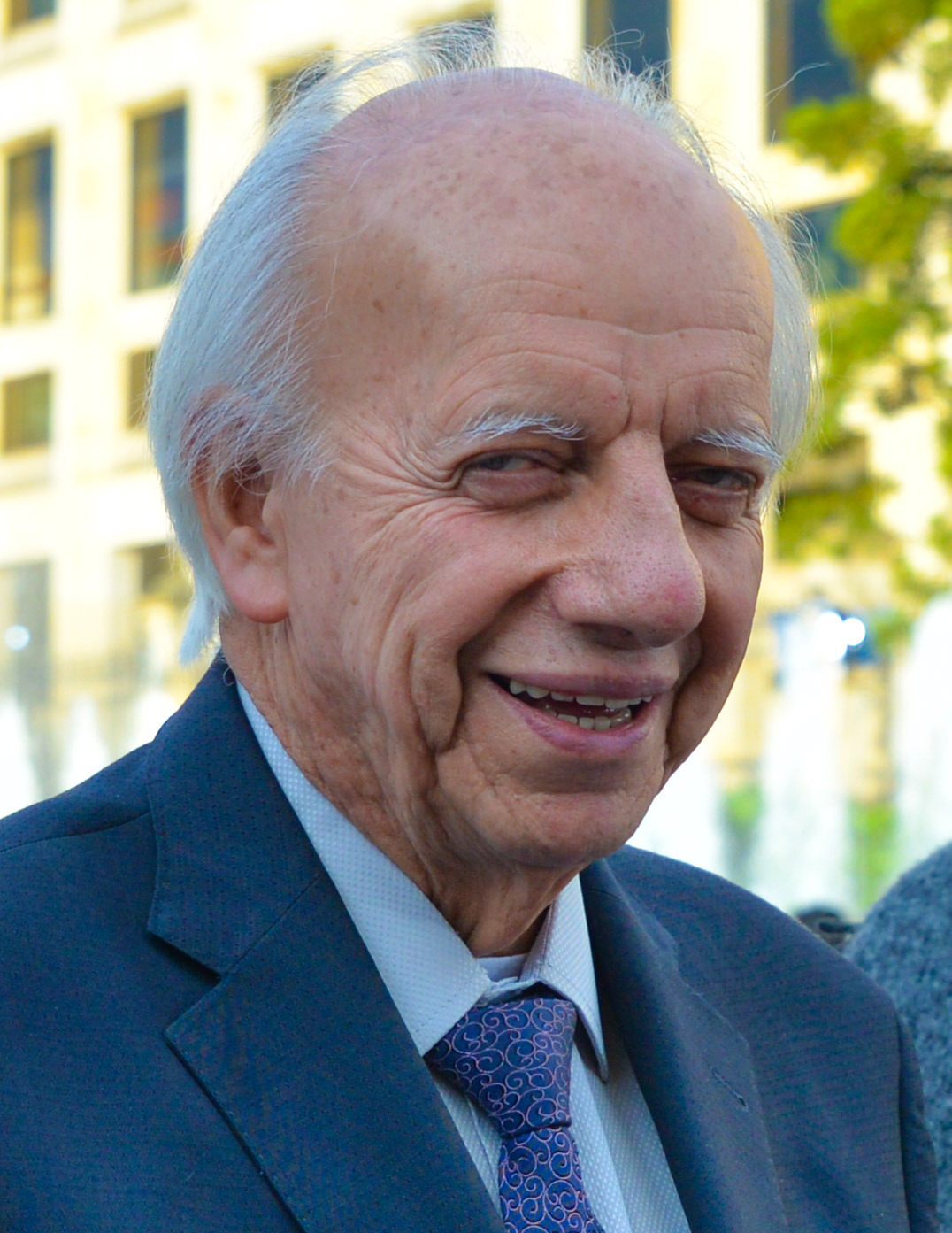

Vice Minister of Culture for Creativity
- In office August 2, 2023 – October 25, 2024
- President: Gustavo Petro
- Preceded by: Esteban Zabala (acting)
- Succeeded by: Yannai Kadamani
- In office August 19, 2022 – February 27, 2023
- President: Gustavo Petro
- Preceded by: Adriana Padilla
- Succeeded by: Esteban Zabala (acting)

Minister of Culture
- Acting; February 27, 2023 – August 2, 2023
- President: Gustavo Petro
- Preceded by: Patricia Ariza
- Succeeded by: Juan David Correa

Personal details
- Born: Jorge Ignacio Zorro Sánchez; February 27, 1946 (age 80) Bogotá, D.C., Colombia
- Education: Moscow Conservatory; Paris Conservatory; National University; Boston University; University of Rochester (BMus)
- Profession: Musician, conducting, teacher

Jorge Ignacio Zorro Sánchez (born February 27, 1946) is a Colombian musician, teacher, conductor, politician and human rights defender, served since August 19, 2022, as Vice Minister of Culture for Creativity, since February 27, 2023, he has served as acting Minister of Culture. He has been Ambassador of Colombia to the Russian Federation since 13 August 2025.

Political offices
Preceded by Patricia Ariza	Minister of Culture; Acting; 2023	Succeeded by Juan David Correa
Preceded by Adriana Padilla	Vice Minister of Culture for Creativity; 2022-2023	Succeeded by Esteban Zabala; Acting
Preceded by Esteban Zabala; Acting	Vice Minister of Culture for Creativity; 2023-2024	Succeeded by Yannai Kadamani
