= Mariana Garcés Córdoba =

Colombian lawyer, politician

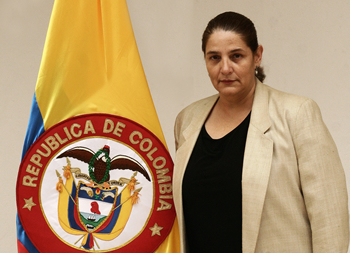

9th Colombian Minister of Culture
- In office 7 August 2010 – 7 August 2018
- President: Juan Manuel Santos
- Preceded by: Paula Marcela Moreno Zapata
- Succeeded by: Carmen Vásquez Camacho

Personal details
- Born: Cali, Valle del Cauca, Colombia
- Education: University of the Andes (LLB)
- Profession: Lawyer

Mariana Garcés Córdoba is the 9th Minister of Culture of Colombia. A native of Santiago de Cali, she has been tied to the region and its culture, including working as General Manager of Telepacífico, Member of the National Television Commission, Director of the Association for the Promotion of the Arts, (Proartes) in Cali, Secretary of Culture and Tourism of Cali, Executive Director of the Philharmonic Orchestra of Valle del Cauca, and at different times, Director of the International Art Festival of Cali.
