= National Poetry Award (Colombia) =

- Awarded for: Work of poetry by a Colombian citizen
- Sponsored by: Colombian Institute of Culture (prior to 1997); Ministry of Culture (1997–present)
- Country: Colombia
- Reward(s): Col$60 million

The National Poetry Award (Spanish: Premio Nacional de Poesía) is an honor presented by Colombia's Ministry of Culture. In its current format, it is given biennially, in alternating years with the National Novel Award. It rewards excellence in poetic production by a Colombian citizen, living in the country or abroad, for a Spanish-language work published in the preceding two years. It includes a monetary prize of 60 million Colombian pesos (16,027 United States dollars).

Prior to 1997, it was presented by the Colombian Institute of Culture.

== List of winners ==
- 1985 – Jotamario Arbeláez, for La casa de la memoria
- 1993 – Rómulo Bustos, for En el traspatio del cielo
- 1994 – Piedad Bonnett, for El hilo de los días
- 2001 – Juan Felipe Robledo, for La música de las horas
- 2004 – Juan Manuel Roca, for Las hipótesis de nadie
- 2010 – Martha Carolina Dávila, for Como las catedrales
- 2013 – Horacio Benavides Zúñiga, for La Serena Hierba
- 2015 – Nelson Romero Guzmán, for Música lenta
- 2017 – Darío Jaramillo Agudelo, for El cuerpo y otra cosa
- 2019 – Rómulo Bustos, for De moscas y de ángeles
- 2021 – Eliana Hernández Pachón, for La mata
