= Natalia Restrepo Escobar =

- Born: Colombia
- Education: National University of Colombia
- Occupation: Biological Engineer

Natalia Restrepo Escobar is a Colombian biological engineer, who obtained a doctorate in biotechnology from the National University of Colombia, Medellín. She received a regional L'Oréal-Unesco Women in Science Award in 2017 and the Young Investigator Prize awarded by the Administrative Department of Science, Technology and Innovation COLCIENCIAS in 2011.

== Early life ==
Restrepo graduated as a Biological Engineer from the National University of Colombia, Medellín branch in 2010. En 2013 she enrolled on a Masters in Biological Sciences in the same institution, where she continued studying for a Doctorate in Biotecnology.

== Career ==
At the National University of Colombia she worked on different research projects in the field of population genetics and biodiversity, in the animal biotechnology investigation group. Her areas of expertise are centred on geometric morphometry and population genetics.

In January 2011, Restrepo received the Prize for Young Investigators awarded by the National University of Colombia and by COLCIENCIAS, the Administrative Department of Science, Technology and Innovation. In 2017 she received a regional L'Oréal-Unesco Women in Science Award in recognition for her doctoral thesis on molecular markers for three species of catfish native to Colombia with environmental protections, found in the Cauca River. She has also published various articles in specialised scientific journals in the United Kingdom and Central America.

== Prizes and awards ==
- 2011 - Young Investigator Prize, Universidad Nacional de Colombia y Colciencias.
- 2017 - L'Oréal- Unesco Regional Prize for Women in Science Central America and Andean Region (Colombia, Ecuador, Panama and Peru)

== Selected publications ==
- Restrepo-Escobar, Natalia; Alzate, Juan F.; Márquez, Edna J. (2016-05-03). "Mitochondrial genome of the Neotropical catfish Ageneiosus pardalis, Lütken 1874 (Siluriformes, Auchenipteridae)". Mitochondrial DNA Part A. 27 (3): 2176–2177. doi:10.3109/19401736.2014.982613. ISSN 2470-1394. PMID 25423507.
- Restrepo-Escobar, Natalia; Alzate, Juan F.; Márquez, Edna J. (2016). "Mitochondrial genome of the Trans-Andean shovelnose catfish Sorubim cuspicaudus (Siluriformes, Pimelodidae)". Mitochondrial DNA Part A. 27 (6): 3964–3965. doi:10.3109/19401736.2014.989506. ISSN 2470-1394. PMID 25541312.
- Restrepo-Escobar, N.; Hurtado-Alarcón, J. C.; Mancera-Rodríguez, N. J.; Márquez, E. J. (2016). "Variations of body geometry in Brycon henni (Teleostei: Characiformes, Bryconidae) in different rivers and streams". Journal of Fish Biology. 89 (1): 522–528. doi:10.1111/jfb.12971. ISSN 0022-1112. PMID 27117920.
- Márquez, Edna Judith; Restrepo-Escobar, Natalia; Montoya-Herrera, Francisco Luis (2016-07-20). "Shell shape variation of queen conch Strombus gigas (Mesograstropoda: Strombidae) from Southwest Caribbean". Revista de Biología Tropical. 64 (4). Universidad de Costa Rica: 1585–1595. doi:10.15517/rbt.v64i4.21468. ISSN 2215-2075. PMID 29465920.
- Restrepo-Escobar, N.; Rangel-Medrano, J. D.; Mancera-Rodríguez, N. J.; Márquez, E. J. (2016). "Molecular and morphometric characterization of two dental morphs of Saccodon dariensis (Parodontidae)". Journal of Fish Biology. 89 (1): 529–536. doi:10.1111/jfb.12961. ISSN 0022-1112. PMID 27109861.
