= María Isabel Urrutia =

Colombian weightlifter, athlete and politician

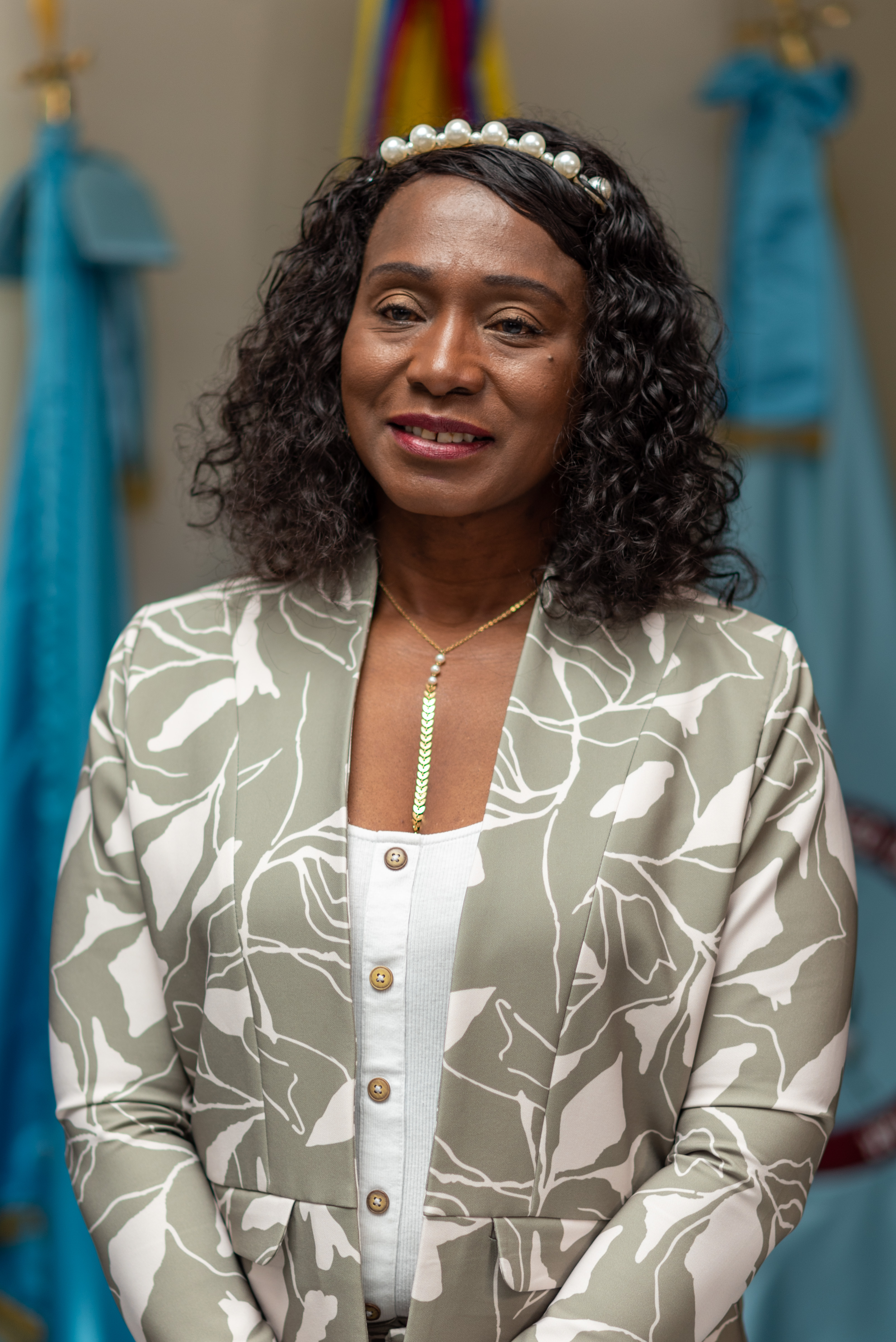
- Urrutia in 2022

Minister of Sports
- In office 11 August 2022 – 7 March 2023
- President: Gustavo Petro
- Preceded by: Guillermo Herrera Castaño
- Succeeded by: Astrid Rodríguez

Member of the Chamber of Representatives
- In office 20 July 2002 – 20 July 2010
- Constituency: Valle del Cauca

Personal details
- Born: María Isabel Urrutia Ocoró; 25 March 1965 (age 61) Candelaria, Valle del Cauca, Colombia
- Party: Humane Colombia
- Other political affiliations: Social Afrocolombian Alliance (2006–2010); United People's Movement (2002–2006)

María Isabel Urrutia
Medal record

Representing Colombia

Women's weightlifting

Olympic Games
Gold medal – first place	2000 Sydney	– 75 kg

World Championships
Gold medal – first place	1990 Sarajevo	82.5 kg
Gold medal – first place	1994 Istanbul	83 kg
Silver medal – second place	1989 Manchester	82.5 kg
Silver medal – second place	1991 Donaueschingen	82.5 kg
Silver medal – second place	1995 Guangzhou	83 kg
Silver medal – second place	1997 Chiang Mai	83 kg
Bronze medal – third place	1996 Warsaw	83 kg
Bronze medal – third place	1998 Lahti	+75 kg

World Games
Gold medal – first place	1997 Lahti	83 kg

Pan American Games
Silver medal – second place	1999 Winnipeg	+75 kg

Women's athletics

South American Games
Gold medal – first place	1982 Santa Fe	Shot put
Gold medal – first place	1982 Santa Fe	Discus throw
Gold medal – first place	1994 Valencia	Discus throw

Bolivarian Games
Gold medal – first place	1981 Barquisimeto	Discus throw
Gold medal – first place	1989 Maracaibo	Shot put
Gold medal – first place	1989 Maracaibo	Discus throw
Gold medal – first place	1993 Cochabamba	Shot put
Gold medal – first place	1993 Cochabamba	Discus throw
Gold medal – first place	1997 Arequipa	Shot put
Gold medal – first place	1997 Arequipa	Discus throw
Silver medal – second place	1981 Barquisimeto	Shot put

CAC Junior Championships (U20)
Gold medal – first place	1984 San Juan	Discus throw
Silver medal – second place	1984 San Juan	Shot put

María Isabel Urrutia Ocoró (born 25 March 1965) is a Colombian politician and former weightlifter and athlete. She won the first ever gold medal for Colombia at the Summer Olympic Games.

== Athletic career ==
Initially she competed in shot put and discus throw, and participated in the 1988 Summer Olympics in these events.

She switched to weightlifting in 1989, and won silver at the 1989 World Championships. She won gold at the 1990, silver 1991, gold 1994, silver 1995, bronze 1996, silver 1997, and bronze at the 1998 World Weightlifting Championships.

Urrutia won a gold medal in the women's 75 kg class in the 2000 Summer Olympics, her country's first Olympic gold medal.

== Personal life ==
Urrutia retired after the 2000 Olympics and entered politics. She held a seat in the Chamber of Representatives of Colombia from 2002 to 2010 (twice elected: 2002 and 2006).

== Achievements in track and field ==
Year	Competition	Venue	Position	Event	Notes
Representing Colombia
1981	Bolivarian Games	Barquisimeto, Venezuela	2nd	Shot put	13.34 m
1981	Bolivarian Games	Barquisimeto, Venezuela	1st	Discus	42.76 m
1982	Southern Cross Games	Santa Fe, Argentina	1st	Shot put	13.27 m
1982	Southern Cross Games	Santa Fe, Argentina	1st	Discus	44.84 m
1983	South American Championships	Santa Fe, Argentina	6th	Shot put	13.00 m
1983	South American Championships	Santa Fe, Argentina	2nd	Discus	45.00 m
1984	Central American and Caribbean Junior Championships (U-20)	San Juan, Puerto Rico	2nd	Shot put	13.57 m
1984	Central American and Caribbean Junior Championships (U-20)	San Juan, Puerto Rico	1st	Discus	48.74 m
1986	Central American and Caribbean Games	Santiago de los Caballeros, Dominican Republic	3rd	Shot put	14.48 m
1986	Central American and Caribbean Games	Santiago de los Caballeros, Dominican Republic	3rd	Discus	50.68 m
1986	Ibero-American Championships	Havana, Cuba	4th	Shot put	14.75 m
1986	Ibero-American Championships	Havana, Cuba	2nd	Discus	56.84 m
1987	Pan American Games	Indianapolis, United States	7th	Shot put	14.47 m
1987	Pan American Games	Indianapolis, United States	4th	Discus	57.08 m
1987	World Championships	Rome, Italy	18th	Discus	53.94 m
1988	Ibero-American Championships	Mexico City, Mexico	5th	Shot put	14.83 m A
1988	Ibero-American Championships	Mexico City, Mexico	3rd	Discus	54.22 m A
1988	Olympic Games	Seoul, South Korea	20th	Shot put	15.13 m
1988	Olympic Games	Seoul, South Korea	17th	Discus	53.82m
1989	Bolivarian Games	Maracaibo, Venezuela	1st	Shot put	15.41 m
1989	Bolivarian Games	Maracaibo, Venezuela	1st	Discus	50.22 m
1990	Central American and Caribbean Games	Mexico City, Mexico	3rd	Shot put	16.09 m
1990	Central American and Caribbean Games	Mexico City, Mexico	3rd	Discus	53.84 m
1991	South American Championships	Manaus, Brazil	1st	Shot put	16.34 m
1991	South American Championships	Manaus, Brazil	1st	Discus	51.70 m
1991	Pan American Games	Havana, Cuba	6th	Shot put	15.41 m
1991	Pan American Games	Havana, Cuba	5th	Discus	55.80 m
1992	Ibero-American Championships	Seville, Spain	3rd	Discus	57.46 m
1993	Bolivarian Games	Cochabamba, Bolivia	1st	Shot put	15.35 m A
1993	Bolivarian Games	Cochabamba, Bolivia	1st	Discus	54.08 m A
1993	South American Championships	Lima, Peru	2nd	Shot put	15.09 m
1993	South American Championships	Lima, Peru	1st	Discus	55.14 m
1993	Central American and Caribbean Games	Ponce, Puerto Rico	5th	Shot put	14.68 m
1993	Central American and Caribbean Games	Ponce, Puerto Rico	3rd	Discus	53.12 m
1994	South American Games	Valencia, Venezuela	1st	Discus	58.08 m
1995	South American Championships	Manaus, Brazil	2nd	Shot put	16.43 m
1995	South American Championships	Manaus, Brazil	2nd	Discus	54.60 m
1997	Bolivarian Games	Arequipa, Peru	1st	Shot put	15.51 m A
1997	Bolivarian Games	Arequipa, Peru	1st	Discus	51.80 m A
1998	Central American and Caribbean Games	Maracaibo, Venezuela	2nd	Shot put	14.25 m
1998	Central American and Caribbean Games	Maracaibo, Venezuela	3rd	Discus	50.44 m

== See also ==
- List of Afro-Latinos

Olympic Games
Preceded by Marlon Pérez Arango	Flagbearer for Colombia; Sydney 2000	Succeeded by Carmenza Delgado

Political offices
Preceded by Guillermo Herrera	Minister of Sports; 2022–2023	Succeeded by Astrid Rodríguez
Order of precedence
Preceded by Jorge Zorro as Former Minister of Culture	Order of precedence of Colombia as Former Gabinet Member	Succeeded by Astrid Rodríguez as Former Minister of Sports
