= Juan Carlos Florián =

Colombian politician (born 1982)

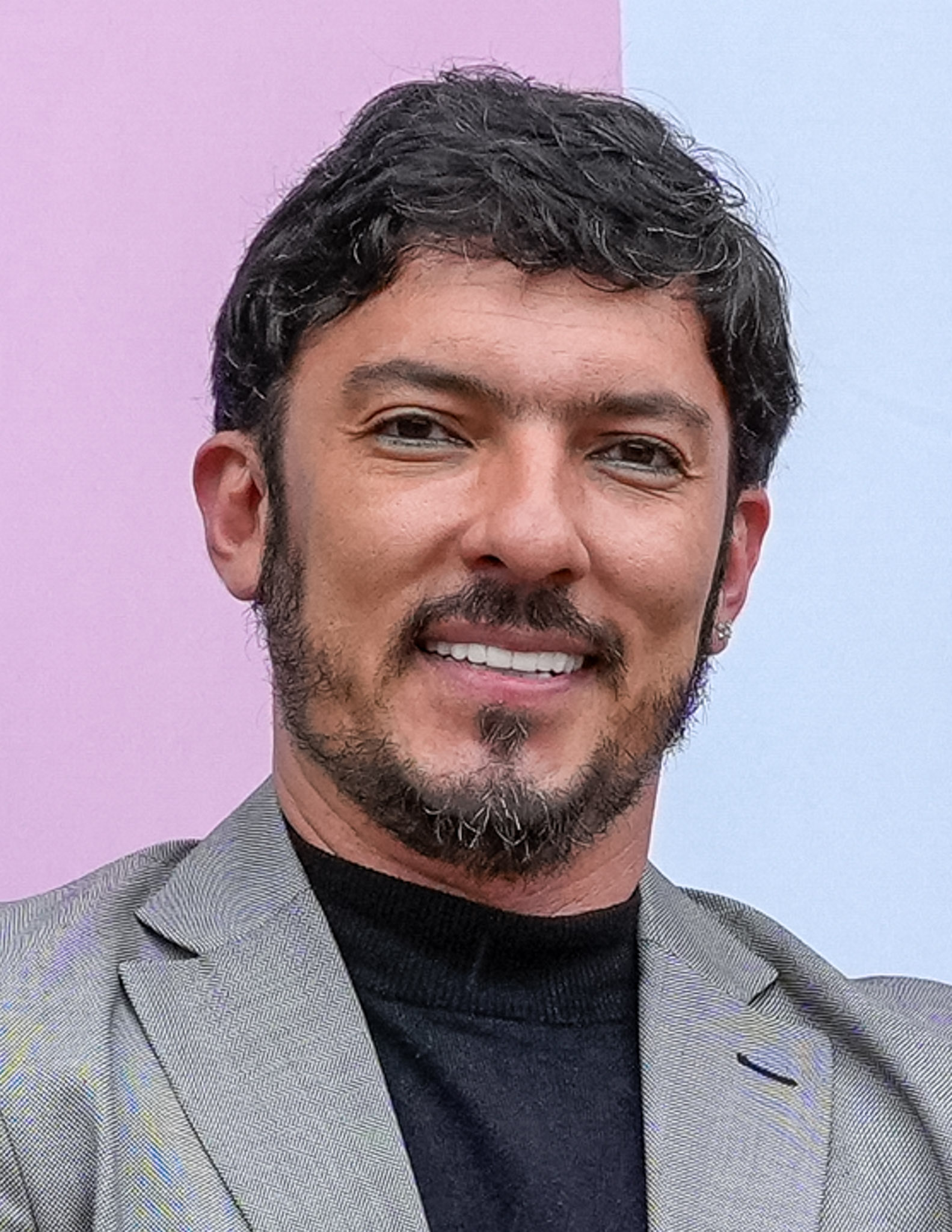
- Florián in 2025

Minister of Equality and Equity
- In office 5 August 2025 – 20 January 2026
- President: Gustavo Petro
- Preceded by: Carlos Rosero
- Succeeded by: Luis Alfredo Acosta

Deputy Minister of Diversity
- In office 4 February 2025 – 5 August 2025
- President: Gustavo Petro
- Preceded by: Position established
- Succeeded by: Dumar Guevara

Personal details
- Born: Juan Carlos Florián Silva; October 20, 1982 (age 43) Ibagué, Tolima, Colombia
- Party: Humane Colombia (2022-present)
- Education: Pontificia Universidad Javeriana (BSc)
- Occupation: Politician; activist

Juan Carlos Florián Silva (born October 20, 1982) is a Colombian political scientist, activist, human rights defender and politician who has served as Minister of Equality and Equity from 2025 to 2026 under President Gustavo Petro.

Born in Ibagué, Tolima, Florián has been known for his work within the LGBTQ community. In February 2025, he became the first Deputy Minister of Diversity under Minister Carlos Rosero and later became Minister of Equality and Equity in August 2025 following the resignation of Carlos Rosero.

== Biography ==
Florián holds a degree in political science from the Pontificia Universidad Javeriana. He holds a master's degree in political communication from the University of Lleida.He was a key figure during mayoralty of Gustavo Petro, serving as the first deputy director for LGBTI Affairs. He has also served as a communications strategy advisor at the Consulate of Colombia in Paris. He has worked in the public sector and in non-governmental organizations such as Save the Children and Doctors Without Borders.

Florián's appointment as Deputy Minister sparked debate in Colombian politics, as during his years living in Paris he worked as an adult film actor in productions aimed at gay audiences. With comments both for and against, the controversy led the then Minister of Equality, Francia Márquez, to oppose his appointment and block Florián's inauguration as Deputy Minister for over a year.

== Personal life ==
Florián is HIV-positive.

Political offices
New office	Deputy Minister of Diversity; 2025	Succeeded by Dumar Guevara
Preceded by Carlos Rosero	Minister of Equality and Equity; 2025-2026	Succeeded by Luis Alfredo Acosta
