= 1996 World Weightlifting Championships – Women's 83 kg =

The 1996 World Weightlifting Championships were held in Warsaw, Poland from 3 May to 11 May. The women's competition in the 83 kilograms division was staged on 10 May.

== Medalists ==
Event	Gold		Silver		Bronze	
Snatch	Wei Xiangying (CHN)	110.0 kg	Chen Shu-chih (TPE)	107.5 kg	María Isabel Urrutia (COL)	100.0 kg
Clean & Jerk	María Isabel Urrutia (COL)	135.0 kg	Chen Shu-chih (TPE)	135.0 kg	Wei Xiangying (CHN)	132.5 kg
Total	Wei Xiangying (CHN)	242.5 kg	Chen Shu-chih (TPE)	242.5 kg	María Isabel Urrutia (COL)	235.0 kg

== Records ==
Prior to this competition, the existing world records were as follows.

World record	Snatch	Zhang Xiaoli (CHN)	108.0 kg	Hiroshima, Japan	5 October 1994
World record	Clean & Jerk	Chen Shu-chih (TPE)	135.0 kg	Guangzhou, China	24 November 1995
World record	Total	Chen Shu-chih (TPE)	240.0 kg	Guangzhou, China	24 November 1995

== Results ==
Rank	Athlete	Body weight	Snatch (kg)				Clean & Jerk (kg)				Total
Rank	Athlete	Body weight	1	2	3	Rank	1	2	3	Rank	Total
1st place, gold medalist(s)	Wei Xiangying (CHN)	78.35	102.5	108.5	110.0	1st place, gold medalist(s)	130.0	132.5	~~135.0~~	3rd place, bronze medalist(s)	242.5
2nd place, silver medalist(s)	Chen Shu-chih (TPE)	82.80	102.5	107.5	~~110.0~~	2nd place, silver medalist(s)	130.0	135.0	~~137.5~~	2nd place, silver medalist(s)	242.5
3rd place, bronze medalist(s)	María Isabel Urrutia (COL)	79.50	~~100.0~~	100.0	~~105.0~~	3rd place, bronze medalist(s)	125.0	132.5	135.0	1st place, gold medalist(s)	235.0
4	Monique Riesterer (GER)	82.10	95.0	~~100.0~~	100.0	4	115.0	120.0	125.0	4	225.0
5	Line Mary (FRA)	80.90	92.5	97.5	~~100.0~~	5	110.0	~~115.0~~	~~115.0~~	6	207.5
6	Miyuki Arai (JPN)	82.45	82.5	87.5	~~90.0~~	7	107.5	112.5	~~115.0~~	5	200.0
7	Caroline Pileggi (AUS)	82.90	~~75.0~~	75.0	80.0	8	95.0	~~100.0~~	102.5	7	182.5
—	Natalia Chiriaeva (RUS)	82.35	95.0	~~100.0~~	~~102.5~~	6	~~115.0~~	~~115.0~~	~~115.0~~	—	—

== New records ==
Snatch	108.5 kg	Wei Xiangying (CHN)	WR
Snatch	110.0 kg	Wei Xiangying (CHN)	WR
Total	242.5 kg	Wei Xiangying (CHN)	WR
