= Astrid Rodríguez =

Colombian educator and researcher

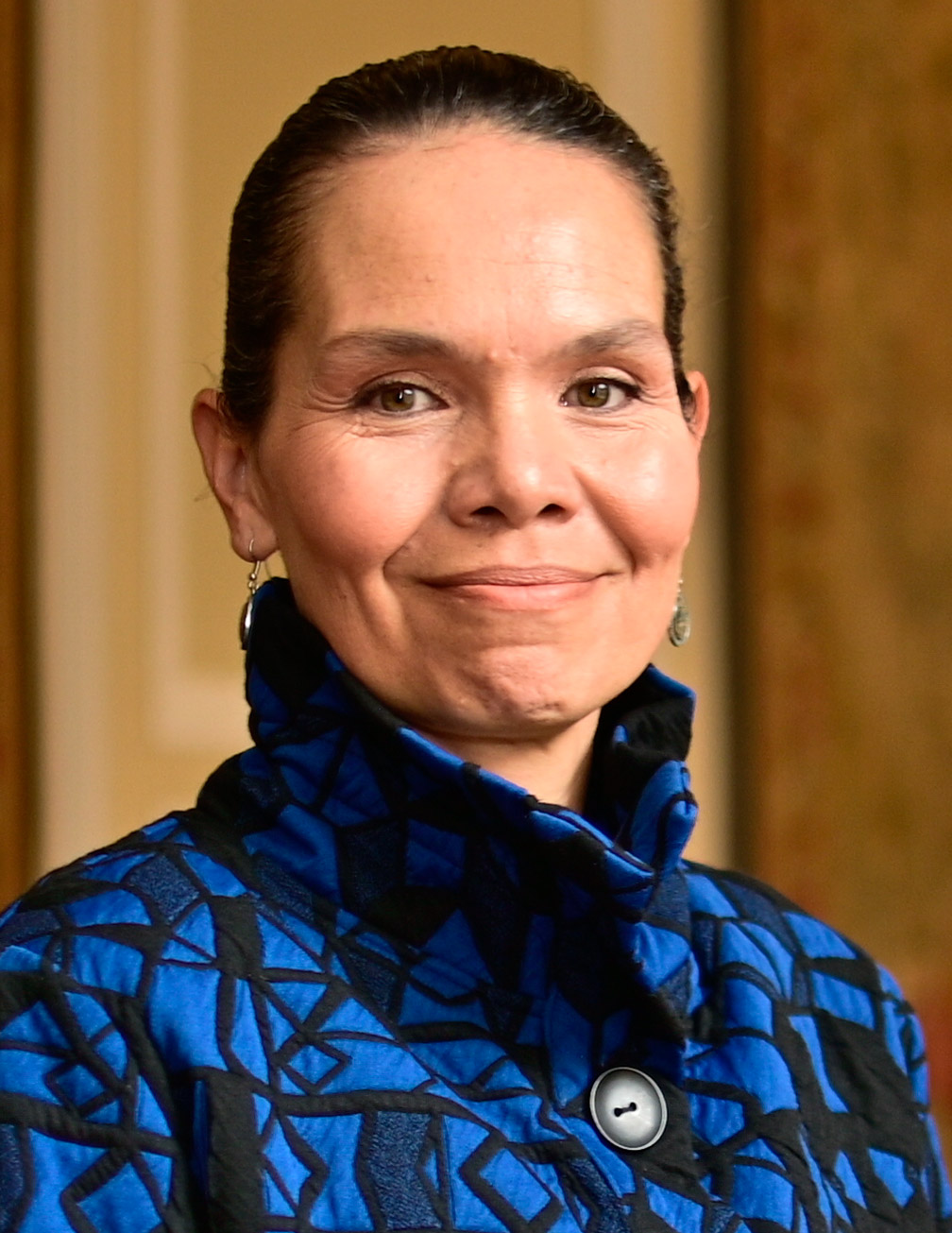

Minister of Sports
- In office March 7, 2023 – February 15, 2024
- President: Gustavo Petro
- Preceded by: María Isabel Urrutia
- Succeeded by: Luz Cristina López

Personal details
- Born: Astrid Bibiana Rodríguez Cortés Bogota, D.C., Colombia
- Education: National Pedagogic University; Universidad Externado de Colombia; Jorge Tadeo Lozano University
- Profession: Educator; researcher

Astrid Bibiana Rodríguez Cortés is a Colombian educator and researcher. Rodriguez was Minister of Sports during Gustavo Petro's administration from March 7, 2023, until her resignation on February 15, 2024, after the controversy caused by the removal of Barranquilla as hosts of the 2027 Pan American Games.

== Notes ==
Political offices
| Preceded by María Isabel Urrutia | Minister of Sports; 2023–2024 | Succeeded by Luz Cristina López |
