= Luz Cristina López =

Minister of Sports of Colombia (since 2024)

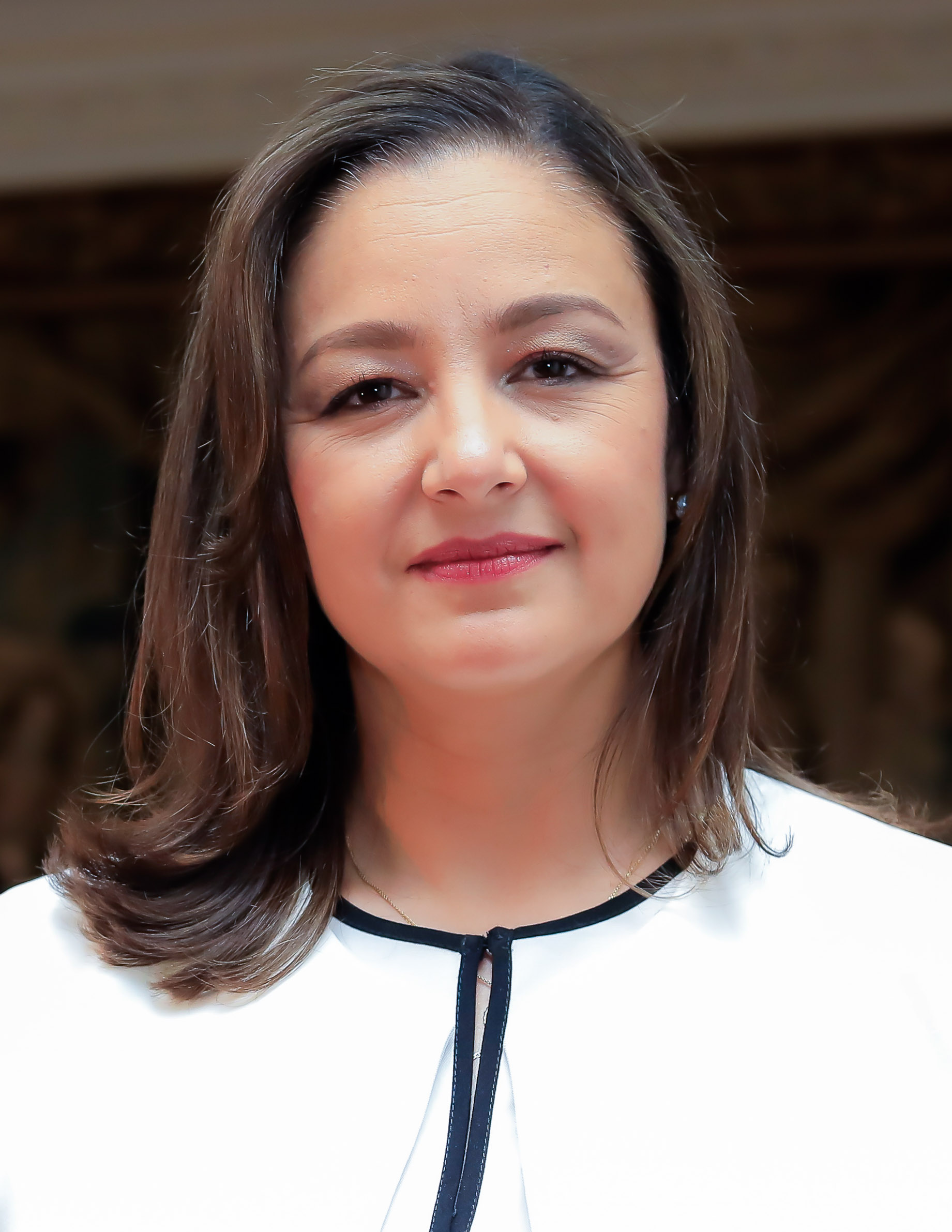

Minister of Sports
- In office March 4, 2024 – March 3, 2025
- President: Gustavo Petro
- Preceded by: Astrid Rodríguez
- Succeeded by: Patricia Duque

Personal details
- Born: Luz Cristina López Trejos; March 20, 1976 (age 50) Manizales, Caldas, Colombia
- Education: National Training Service
- Alma mater: Saint Thomas Aquinas University (BBA)
- Profession: Educator; business administrator

Luz Cristina López Trejos (born March 20, 1976) is a Colombian physical educator, business administrator, and politician who served as Minister of Sports from 2024 to 2025 during the Presidency of Gustavo Petro. A master in Active Pedagogies and Human Development and worked as Director of the Colombian Olympic Committee academy and general manager of the Colombian Paralympic Committee.

Born in Manizales, Caldas, she studied Physical Education at Saint Thomas Aquinas University, where she served as dean of the Faculty of Physical Culture.

== Notes ==
Political offices
Preceded by Astrid Rodríguez	Minister of Sports; 2024–2025	Succeeded by Patricia Duque
