= Angélica Mayolo Obregón =

Colombian lawyer and politician (born 1990)

Angélica María Mayolo Obregón
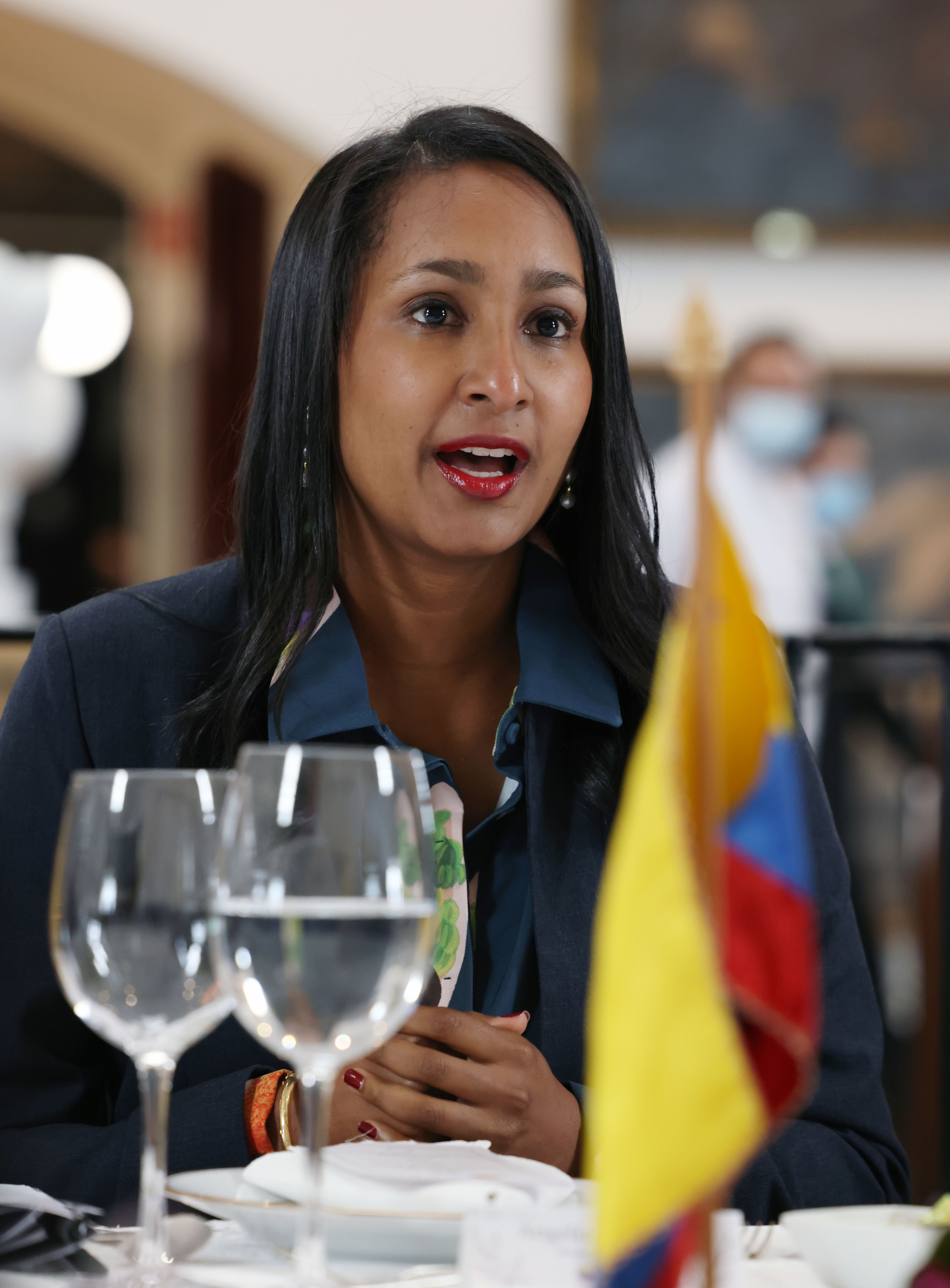

Personal details
- Born: January 6, 1990 (age 36) Buenaventura, Valle del Cauca, Colombia
- Education: Massachusetts Institute of Technology
- Alma mater: Pontificia Universidad Javeriana; University of California, Los Angeles

Angelica Maria Mayolo Obregón (born January 6, 1990) is a Colombian lawyer and politician who was the nation's Minister of Culture from 2018 to 2022. Obregón is a MLK Scholar in the Environmental Solutions initiative at the Massachusetts Institute of Technology. She was awarded the 2019 Policarpa Salavarrieta Medal in recognition of her work on gender equality.

== Early life and education ==
Obregón was born in Buenaventura. Her father, Antonio Mayolo, was the founder and principal of Colegio Gimnasio Buenaventura. Her mother, Merlyn Obregón, was a bacteriologist and manager of a clinical laboratory. Obregón studied law at the Pontificia Universidad Javeriana, where she specialised in administrative law. She was a graduate student in International and Comparative Law from the University of California, Los Angeles where she held a Critical Race Studies Fellowship.

== Career ==
Obregón completed her judiciary work in the Council of State. In 2012, under the government of Juan Manuel Santos, Obregón became an advisor to the Presidential Competitiveness Council.

In the 2016 ministry of Luis Gilberto Murillo, Obregón was appointed as Head of International Affairs of the Ministry of Environment and Sustainable Development. Two years later, she was made Secretary of Economic Development under the administration of Mayor Norman Maurice Armitage. In 2019, the Obama Foundation selected Obregón to meet Barack Obama and devise strategies to reduce inequality. She was awarded the Congress of the Republic of Colombia Policarpa Salavarrieta Medal in recognition of her efforts to advance women's rights.

Obregón was made Executive President of the Colombian Cámara de Comercio de Buenaventura in 2020. The following year, Iván Duque appointed her as the Minister of Culture. At the time, she was the youngest member of the presidential cabinet. Forbes Magazine named her one of the most powerful women in Colombia.

Obregón was selected as a Massachusetts Institute of Technology Martin Luther King Jr. Visiting Scholar. She is a Research Fellow in the Environmental Solutions initiative. She leads the Afro-Interamerican Forum on Climate Change, which encourages Afro-descendant communities to get involved with climate action.
