= Juan David Correa =

Colombian writer, journalist and editor (born 1976)

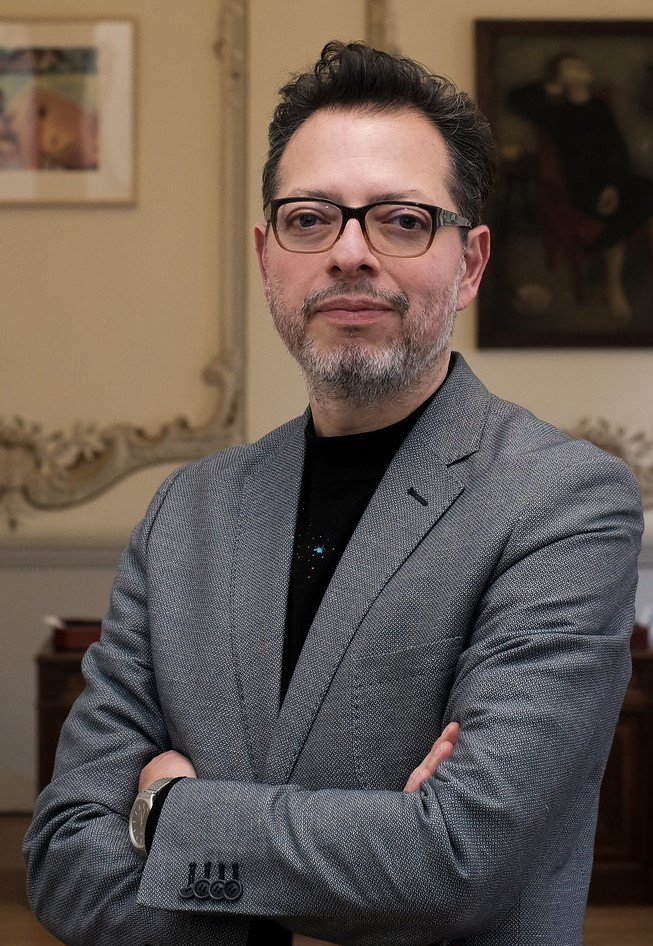
- Official portrait, 2023

Minister of Culture
- In office August 13, 2023 – February 5, 2025
- President: Gustavo Petro
- Preceded by: Patricia Ariza
- Succeeded by: Yannai Kadamani

Personal details
- Born: Bogotá, D.C., Colombia
- Party: Humane Colombia (2021-present)
- Other political affiliations: Historic Pact (2021-present)
- Education: University of the Andes (BA)

Juan David Correa Ulloa (c. 1976) is a Colombian politician. From August 2023 to February 2025, he served as Minister of Culture.

Political offices
Preceded by Patricia Ariza	Minister of Culture; 2023–2025	Succeeded by Yannai Kadamani
