= 1997 World Weightlifting Championships – Women's 83 kg =

The 1997 World Weightlifting Championships were held in Chiang Mai, Thailand from December 6 to December 14. The women's competition in the 83 kg division was staged on 13 December 1997.

== Medalists ==
Event	Gold		Silver		Bronze	
Snatch	Tang Weifang (CHN)	117.5 kg	Albina Khomich (RUS)	107.5 kg	María Isabel Urrutia (COL)	105.0 kg
Clean & Jerk	Tang Weifang (CHN)	142.5 kg	María Isabel Urrutia (COL)	130.0 kg	Aye Mon Khin (MYA)	127.5 kg
Total	Tang Weifang (CHN)	260.0 kg	María Isabel Urrutia (COL)	235.0 kg	Aye Mon Khin (MYA)	227.5 kg

== Records ==
Prior to this competition, the existing world records were as follows.

World Record	Snatch	115.0 kg
World Record	Clean & Jerk	142.5 kg
World Record	Total	257.5 kg

== Results ==
Rank	Athlete	Body weight	Snatch (kg)				Clean & Jerk (kg)				Total
Rank	Athlete	Body weight	1	2	3	Rank	1	2	3	Rank	Total
1st place, gold medalist(s)	Tang Weifang (CHN)	76.30	110.0	115.0	117.5	1st place, gold medalist(s)	135.0	140.0	143.0	1st place, gold medalist(s)	260.0
2nd place, silver medalist(s)	María Isabel Urrutia (COL)	81.75	100.0	~~105.0~~	105.0	3rd place, bronze medalist(s)	130.0	~~137.5~~	~~137.5~~	2nd place, silver medalist(s)	235.0
3rd place, bronze medalist(s)	Aye Mon Khin (MYA)	81.25	95.0	100.0	~~105.0~~	4	120.0	125.0	127.5	3rd place, bronze medalist(s)	227.5
4	Albina Khomich (RUS)	81.70	100.0	105.0	107.5	2nd place, silver medalist(s)	~~120.0~~	120.0	~~125.0~~	4	227.5
5	Monique Riesterer (GER)	81.95	90.0	~~95.0~~	~~95.0~~	7	115.0	~~120.0~~	120.0	5	210.0
6	Karoliina Lundahl (FIN)	82.75	~~95.0~~	~~95.0~~	95.0	5	110.0	115.0	~~117.5~~	6	210.0
7	Caroline Pileggi (AUS)	82.75	~~87.5~~	87.5	92.5	6	~~107.5~~	107.5	~~115.0~~	8	200.0
8	Dilek Ünal (TUR)	78.65	80.0	85.0	~~87.5~~	9	100.0	105.0	110.0	7	195.0
9	Theano Zagkliveri (GRE)	76.10	82.5	85.0	~~87.5~~	8	100.0	105.0	~~110.0~~	9	190.0
10	Zuzana Kováčová (SVK)	81.40	75.0	~~80.0~~	~~80.0~~	11	100.0	105.0	~~110.0~~	10	180.0
11	Rosetta Penani (NRU)	78.05	65.0	70.0	75.0	10	90.0	95.0	~~100.0~~	11	170.0
DQ	Derya Açikgöz (TUR)	82.70	105.0	110.0	115.0	—	140.0	147.5	—	—	—

== New records ==
Snatch	117.5 kg	Tang Weifang (CHN)	WR
Clean & Jerk	143.0 kg	Tang Weifang (CHN)	WR
Clean & Jerk	~~147.5 kg~~	~~Derya Açikgöz (TUR)~~	~~WR~~
Total	260.0 kg	Tang Weifang (CHN)	WR
Total	~~262.5 kg~~	~~Derya Açikgöz (TUR)~~	~~WR~~
