= Ministry of Equality and Equity (Colombia) =

Colombian ministry under Gustavo Petro

- Ministerio de Igualdad y Equidad

Ministry overview
- Formed: June 29, 2023
- Dissolved: June 19, 2026
- Headquarters: Bogotá, D.C., Colombia
- Annual budget: COP$ 256,723,246,372
- Ministry executive: Luis Alfredo Acosta, Liquidating Agent for the Ministry of Equality and Equity (last)
- Website: www.minigualdadyequidad.gov.co/portal/

The Ministry of Equality and Equity (Spanish: Ministerio de Igualdad y Equidad, MIE) was an agency of the Executive Branch at the central level. It was in charge of formulating, directing, coordinating, articulating, strengthening, managing and executing policies that guarantee the inclusion and protection of the rights of women, ethnic peoples, the LGBTQ+ community, the migrant population, people with disabilities, the inhabitants street, children, peasants, people living in excluded territories and guarantee and enforce equality and the right to it.

The person that directed the Ministry was appointed by the President and occupied the nineteenth place in the order of ministerial precedence, at the time of its existence.

The Ministry was approved by Congress on December 12, 2022. The ministry's liquidation was ordered by Congress on June 5, 2026.

== List of Ministers ==
Name	Assumed office	Left office	President(s) served under
Francia Márquez	June 1, 2023	February 27, 2025	Gustavo Petro
Carlos Rosero	February 27, 2025	August 2, 2025	Gustavo Petro
Juan Carlos Florián	August 5, 2025	January 21, 2026	Gustavo Petro
Luis Alfredo Acosta	January 21, 2026	June 19, 2026	Gustavo Petro
