= Luis Alfredo Acosta =

Colombian indigenous leader (born 1973)

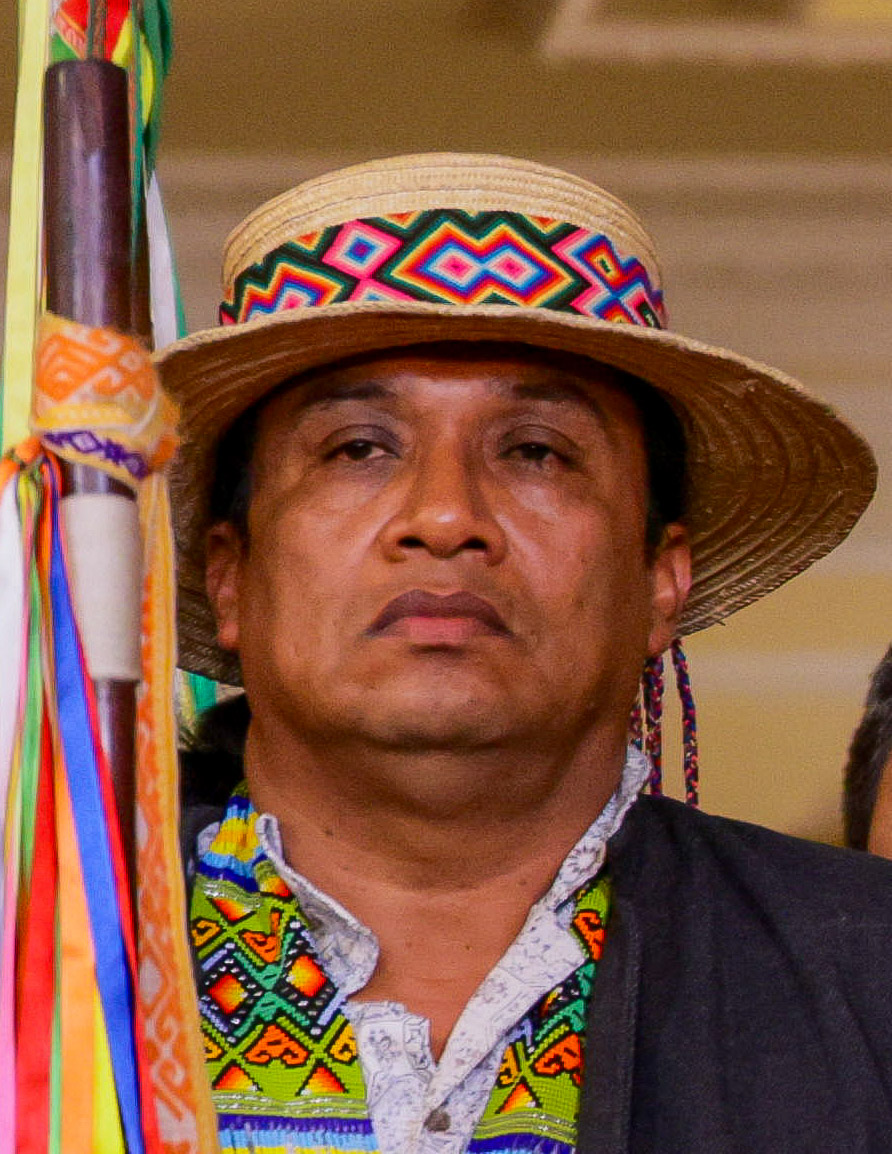
- Acosta in 2025

Liquidating Agent for the Ministry of Equality and Equity
- In office 19 June 2026 – 7 August 2026
- President: Gustavo Petro
- Preceded by: Office established
- Succeeded by: John Milton Rodríguez

Minister of Equality and Equity
- In office 21 January 2026 – 19 June 2026
- President: Gustavo Petro
- Preceded by: Juan Carlos Florián
- Succeeded by: Office abolished

Personal details
- Born: Luis Alfredo Acosta Zapata; 1973 (age 52–53) Caloto, Cauca, Colombia
- Party: Alternative Indigenous and Social Movement (2015-present)
- Other political affiliations: Historic Pact for Colombia (2021-2025)

Luis Alfredo Acosta Zapata (born c. 1973) is a Colombian indigenous leader and politician who served as the last Minister of Equality and Equity from January to June 2026, before the ministry's liquidation, and later serving as a liquidating agent for the aforementioned ministry until the end of the Petro administration.

Born in Caloto, Cauca, he is recognized for his activism in education. He participated in Operation Hope where children lost in the Amazon jungle were rescued after a plane crash in 2023. In 2026 he was appointed by President Gustavo Petro as Minister of Equality and Equity, replacing Juan Carlos Florián.

Acosta served his term until the start of the liquidation process for the ministry on 5 June 2026, after the process was ordered, Acosta was named as the liquidation agent for that ministry.

== Early life, education and family ==
Luis Alfredo Acosta Zapata was born in Caloto, Cauca, in 1973. His father was one of the founders of the Regional Indigenous Council of Cauca. His mother was governor of the Huellas indigenous reservation.

His father was disappeared when he was 8 years old by the FARC. As a teacher he has highlighted the importance of ethno-education, defending traditional indigenous education based on ancestral knowledge. He has served as national coordinator of the National Indigenous Organization of Colombia.

In 2023, he participated in Operation Hope where children lost in the Amazon jungle were rescued after a plane crash in 2023.

Political offices
Preceded by Juan Carlos Florián	Minister of Equality and Equity; 2026	Incumbent
