= Luis Angel Acosta =

Mexican swimmer (born 1948)

Personal information
- Born: 14 September 1948 (age 77) Mexico City, Mexico

Sport
- Sport: Swimming

Luis Angel Acosta (born 14 September 1948) is a Mexican former swimmer. He competed in two events at the 1968 Summer Olympics.
