= Strengthening =

Strengthening may refer to:

- Strengthening (phonology) or Fortition, a change that increases the degree or duration of stricture of a consonant
- Strength training, exercise designed to improve physical strength

== See also ==
- Strength (disambiguation)
