= Patricia Ariza =

Colombian poet, playwright, actor and politician

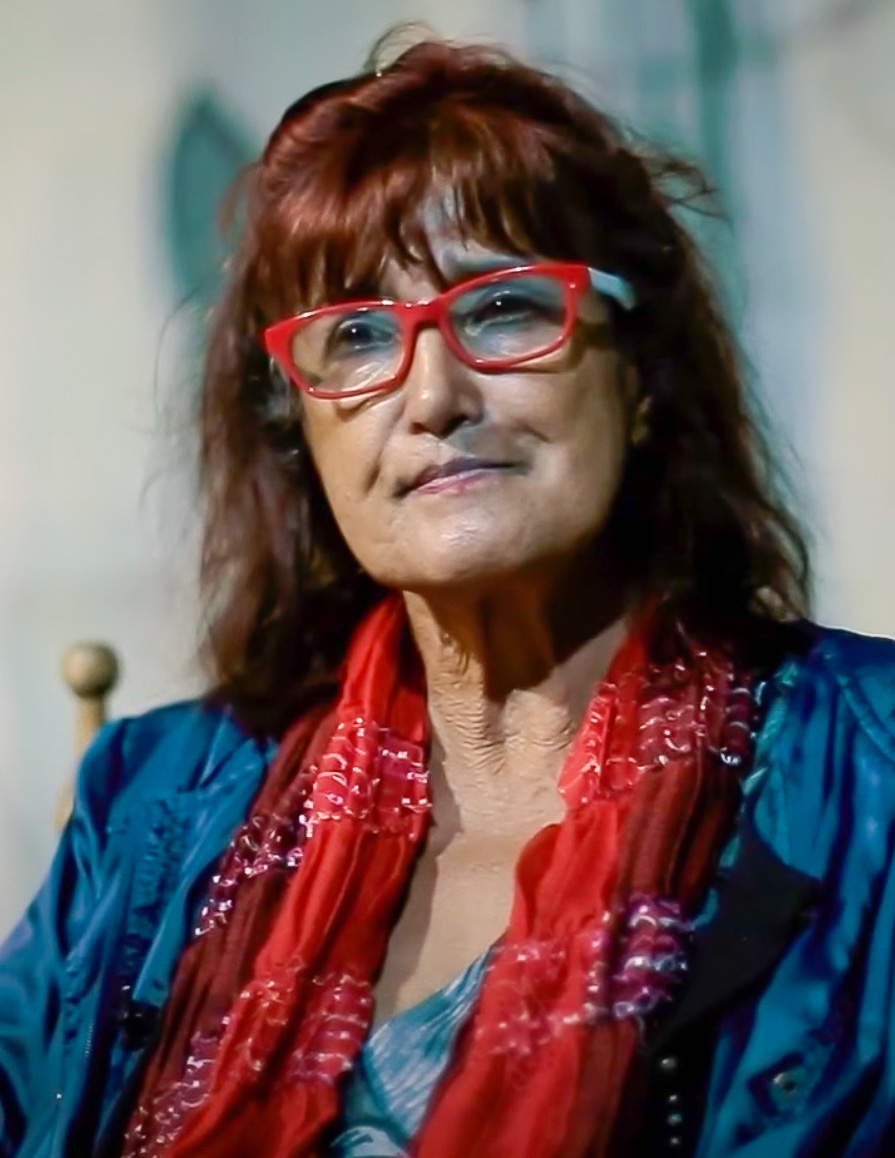
- Ariza in 2016

Minister of Culture
- In office 7 August 2022 – 27 February 2023
- President: Gustavo Petro
- Preceded by: Angelica Mayolo Obregón
- Succeeded by: Jorge Zorro(acting)

Personal details
- Born: Patricia Elia Ariza Flórez; 27 January 1946 (age 80) Vélez, Santander, Colombia
- Party: Patriotic Union
- Spouse: Santiago García Pinzón
- Education: National University (BA); University of Arts of Cuba (BVA)
- Profession: Plastic artist; poet; actress; playwright

Patricia Elia Ariza Flórez (Spanish pronunciation: [paˈtɾisja ˈelja aˈɾisa ˈfloɾes]; born 27 January 1946) is a Colombian poet, playwright, actor and former Minister of Culture of the Government of Petro.

== Life and career ==
Patricia Elia Ariza Flórez was born on 27 January 1946 in Vélez, Santander, Colombia. On the run from violence, her family arrived in the Colombian capital of Bogotá in 1948. During her youth she was grasped by Nadaism in Medellín, together with, among others, Gonzalo Arango. Around the same time, at the end of the 1960s, she joined the Colombian Communist Youth (JUCO), being influenced by her future husband Santiago García. In 1992 she left JUCO, meanwhile, she had left García at this time.

In 1966, she and García founded the culture house Casa de la Cultura, which was renamed Teatro La Candelaria later. This was the first alternative theater in Colombia. From 1967 to 1969 she studied art history at the Faculty of Fine Arts of the National University of Colombia in Bogota.

Ariza distinguishes herself in the theatrical world for her special approach which focuses on promoting social interaction and reducing conflicts. For instance, she shows women who left their homes because of violence, elderly, or market salesmen, by letting them tell their life stories and giving them an active role in the development of the narrative. In her scripts, their problems play an important role.

In 1991 she invited the feminist María Evelia Marmolejo to reconstruct her performance 11 de Marzo in commemoration of the International Women's Day along with the dance group Flores de Otoño, with who she later founded La Escuela de Mujeres En Escena por la Paz in 2018. The performance ended with a group of dancers covering Simón Bolívar's statue in the Plaza de Bolívar with a cloth that had traces of menstrual blood. It resulted in strong reactions from people who were walking by and yelled at her to take it down. This event was invented by dancers in present time.

In 2009 the culture scene was shattered by the accusation in a secret police dossier, that claimed she had done her work only as a cover to spread mass propaganda for the communist rebel movement FARC.

In 2007 she was honored with a Culture and conflict Prince Claus Award from the Netherlands for "her outstanding work over decades to empower the disadvantaged, enabling them to transform their lives through cultural activities, for her efforts to counteract injustice and restore social memory, and for her energetic commitment to the reduction of conflict."

In 2014 Ariza was honored by the League of Professional Theatre Women (LPTW) in New York City with the Gilder/Coigney International Theatre Award. The award was presented to Ariza in New York City in October 2014 at a ceremony at the Martin E. Segal Theatre Center, of the Graduate Center, CUNY, and was accompanied by a week of events and workshops with her or celebrating her work.

== Bibliography ==
Ariza was the coauthor of many works. She published a number alone as well, of which the following is a selection:

- 1986: El viento y la ceniza
- 1981: La alegría de leer
- 1984: Tres mujeres y prevert.
- 1989: Mujeres en trance de viaje
- 1991: La Kukhualina
- 1991: Onic; Mi Parce
- 1992: 400 Assa
- 1994: La calle y el parche
- 1992-1993: Seran Diablos o Qué Seran
- 1993: Maria Magdalena,
- 1993: Luna menguante
- 1995: Opera Rap
- 1996: Del cielo a la tierra
- 1996: Proyecto Emily
- 1997: A fuego lento
- 1998: Danza mayor
- 1999: La madre
- 1992: Medea Hungara
- 2000-2001: Antégona
- 2001: Los nadaístas
- 2000: Mujeres desplazándos
- 2001: Camilo vive
- 2012: Soma Mnemosine

== Filmography ==
The following is a selection of her roles as an actress:

- 2006: Antígona
- 2003: Gran Hermano Colombia
- Amar y vivir
- Guadalupe años sin cuenta

The following is a selection of her roles as a director:

- 2006: Antígona
- El viento y la ceniza

Political offices
Preceded by Angelica Mayolo Obregón	Minister of Culture; 2022–2023	Succeeded by Jorge Zorro
Order of precedence
Preceded by Guillermo Reyes as Former Minister of Transport	Order of precedence of Colombia as Former Cabinet Member	Succeeded by Jorge Zorro as Former Minister of Sports
