= Minister of Culture (Colombia) =

Minister of the Government of Colombia

- Council of Ministers; Ministry of Culture
- Style: Mr. Minister (informal)
- Member of: Government of Colombia; Executive Branch
- Reports to: President of Colombia
- Seat: Bogota, D.C.
- Appointer: President of Colombia with Senate advice and consent
- Formation: 7 August 1997; 29 years ago
- First holder: Ramiro Osorio
- Succession: Tenth
- Salary: COL$12,981,949 (monthly)
- Website: www.mincultura.gov.co

The minister of culture is the head of the Ministry of Culture. The minister serves as the principal advisor to the president of Colombia, and the national government, on policies, programs, and activities related to all cultures in Colombia. As a member of the Cabinet of Colombia, the Minister is sixteenth in the line of succession to the presidency.

== Functions and duties ==
The minister of culture leads the formulation of the integral policy of the creative economy in the National Government and develops programs and projects in the terms indicated in the law.

The Ministry of Culture is responsible for leading the intersectoral coordination process to strengthen public, private and mixed institutions, aimed at the promotion, defense, dissemination and development of cultural and creative activities and adequately promote the potential of the cultural and creative economy.

== List ==
Name	Assumed office	Left office	President served under	Ref.
Ramiro Osorio	7 August 1997	7 August 1998	Ernesto Samper	
Alberto Casas	7 August 1998	19 August 1999	Andrés Pastrana	
Juan Luis Mejía	19 August 1999	18 July 2000	Andrés Pastrana	
Consuelo Araújo	18 July 2000	11 March 2001	Andrés Pastrana	
Araceli Morales	11 March 2001	7 August 2002	Andrés Pastrana	
María Consuelo Araújo	7 August 2002	24 January 2006	Álvaro Uribe	
Elvira Cuervo	24 January 2006	10 May 2007	Álvaro Uribe	
Paula Moreno	10 May 2007	7 August 2010	Álvaro Uribe	
Mariana Garcés	7 August 2010	7 August 2018	Juan Manuel Santos	
Angélica Mayolo	7 August 2018	7 August 2022	Iván Duque	
Patricia Ariza	7 August 2022	27 February 2023	Gustavo Petro	
Jorge Zorro (Acting)	27 February 2023	2 August 2023	Gustavo Petro	
Juan David Correa	2 August 2023	5 Febreuay 2025	Gustavo Petro	
Yannai Kadamani	5 February 2025	7 August 2026	Gustavo Petro	
