= Ministry of Science, Technology and Innovation (Colombia) =

Government ministry of Colombia

Ministry of Science, Technology, and Innovation
- Ministerio de Ciencia, Tecnología e Innovación

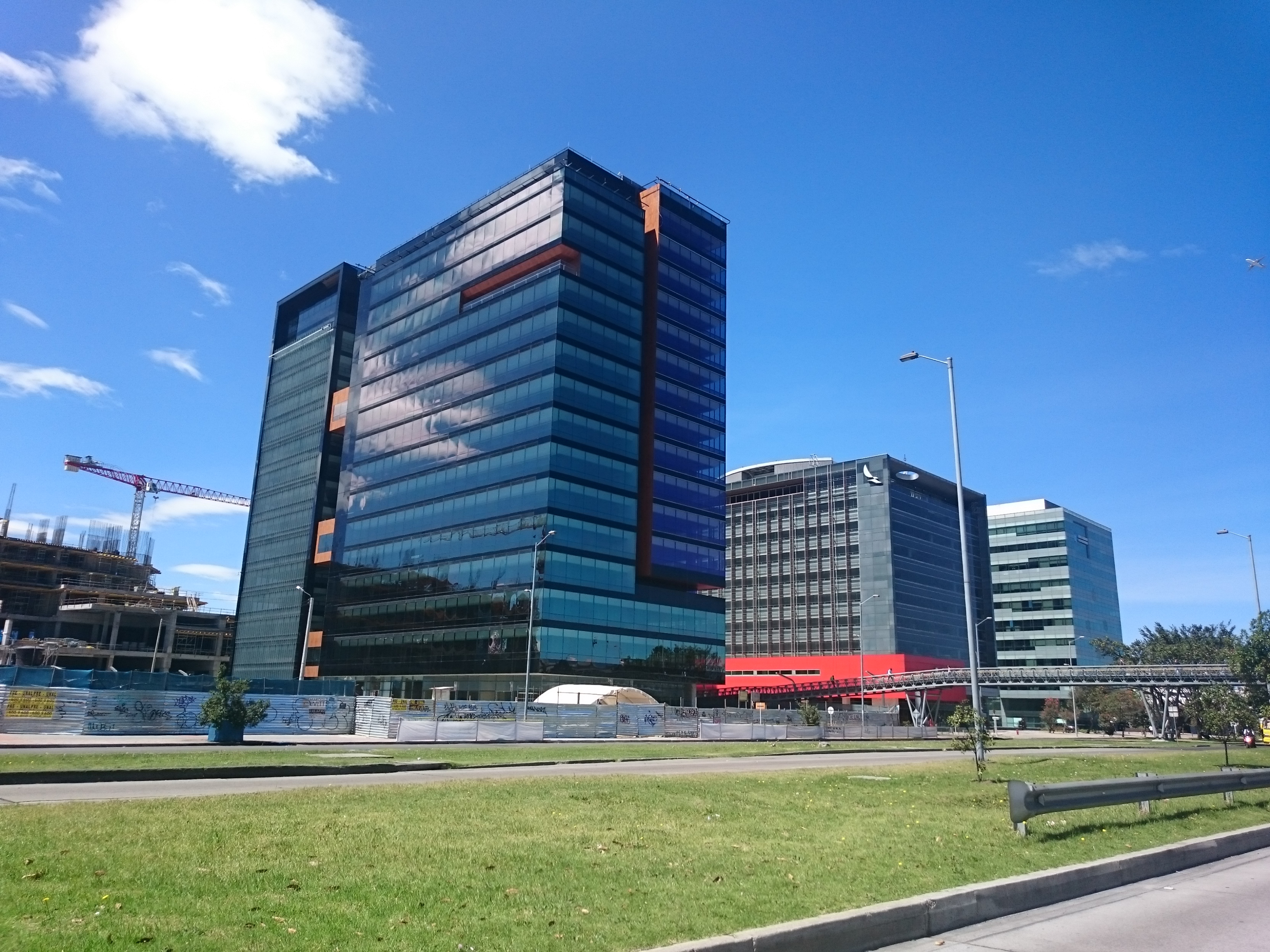
- Ministry Headquarters Building.

Ministry overview
- Formed: 24 January 2020
- Headquarters: Avenida Calle 26 No. 57 - 83 -Tower 8 - Floor 2 to 6 Bogotá, Colombia
- Annual budget: COL$ 392,362 million
- Ministry executive: Claudia Benavides Salazar, Minister; Vice Ministry
- Website: https://minciencias.gov.co/

The Ministry of Science, Technology, and Innovation (Ministerio de Ciencia, Tecnología e Innovación, MinCiencias), a successor to the Administrative Department of Science, Technology and Innovation (Colciencias), is the body of the National Government of Colombia for the management of public administration, rector of the sector and of the National Science System, Technology, and Innovation (SNCTI), in charge of formulating, guiding, directing, coordinating, executing, implementing and controlling the State policy in this matter, in accordance with the development plans and programs, in accordance with Law 2237 of 2022, through which its creation was made official.

The Ministry of Sciences is headed by Minister Yesenia Olaya Requene, born in Tumaco, Nariño She is a sociologist from the University of Caldas, a Master's in Pedagogy from the Autonomous University of Mexico and a PhD from the same university.

She was a research associate at the 'Hutchins Center for African and African American Research' at Harvard University. Her broad approach to diversity and racial equality in Latin America led her to be in 2019 the academic coordinator of the Certificate in Afro-Latin American Studies of this same institution.

== Structure ==
The Ministry of Science, Technology, and Innovation is made up of the Minister's Office, the advisory and support offices, two vice ministries and the general secretariat, as follows:

- Minister of Science, Technology, and Innovation
- Vice Ministry of Knowledge, Innovation, and Productivity
  - Knowledge Generation Department
  - Direction of Transfer and Use of Knowledge
- Vice Ministry of Talent and Social Appropriation of Knowledge
  - Direction of Capabilities and Dissemination of the CTel
  - Direction of Vocations and Formation in CTel
- General Secretary
  - Human Talent Department
  - Administrative and Financial Management

== Publindex ==
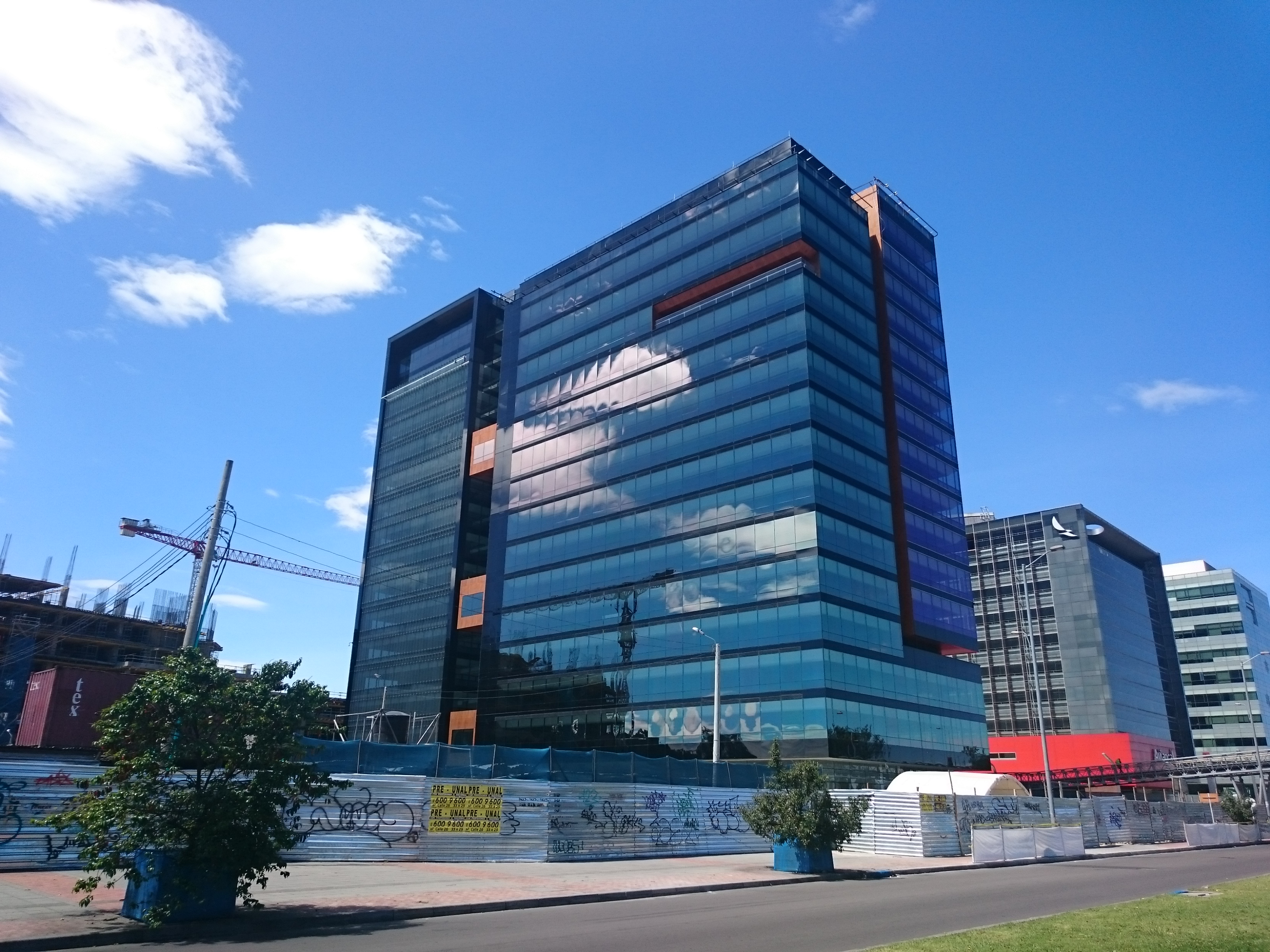
COLCIENCIAS Headquarters.

MinCiencias runs Publindex, the National Abstracting and Indexing System for Serial Publications in Science, Technology and Innovation (Spanish: Sistema Nacional de Indexación de Publicaciones Especializadas de Ciencia, Tecnología e innovación), which is a ranking of academic journals in four categories (C, B, A2, and A1).

== See also ==
- Colciencias
