= Carlos Rosero =

Colombian anthropologist (born 1959)

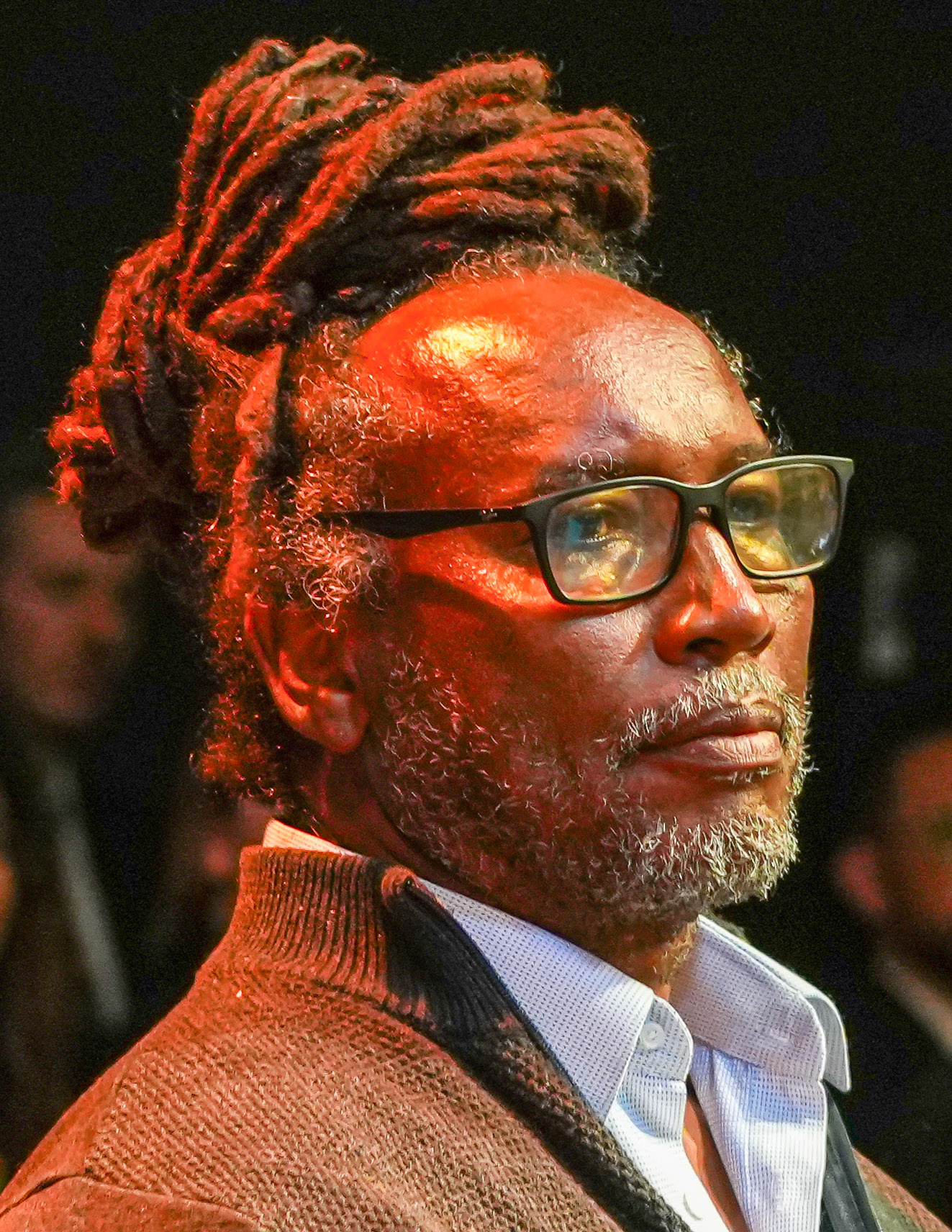
- Official portrait, 2025

Minister of Equality and Equity
- In office February 27, 2025 – August 2, 2025
- President: Gustavo Petro
- Preceded by: Francia Márquez
- Succeeded by: Juan Carlos Florián

Personal details
- Born: Carlos Alfonso Racero; September 7, 1959 (age 67) Buenaventura, Cauca Valley, Colombia
- Party: Soy Porque Somos (2020-present)
- Other political affiliations: Historic Pact for Colombia (2021-present)
- Education: National University of Colombia (BSocSc)
- Occupation: Anthropologist; researcher; social leader; politician

Carlos Alfonso Racero (born September 5, 1959) is a Colombian anthropologist, researcher, social leader, and politician who served as Minister of Equality and Equity from February to August 2025. A member of the Soy Porque Somos Party, he is a member and co-founder of the Black Communities Process political movement.

Born in Buenaventura, Cauca Valley, Rosero studied anthropology at the National University of Colombia. His activism against racism and in support of Afro-Colombian resistance led him to work alongside Francia Márquez.

Political offices
Preceded by Francia Márquez	Minister of Equality and Equity; 2025	Succeeded by Juan Carlos Florián
