= Ministry of Sports (Colombia) =

- Ministerio del Deporte

Ministry overview
- Formed: 11 July 2019
- Preceding Ministry: Ministry of Sports
- Headquarters: Avenida 68 No. 55-65, Bogotá, Colombia
- Annual budget: COL$ 553.000 millones
- Ministry executive: Minister; Viceminister
- Website: https://www.mindeporte.gov.co/

The Ministry of Sport of the Republic of Colombia (Spanish: Ministerio del Deporte, Mindeporte - MD) is the governmental entity of the Executive Branch in charge of formulating, coordinating and monitor the practice of sports, recreation, physical education, the use of free time and physical activity, aimed at improving the quality of life of Colombian society.

It is headquartered at Avenida 68 No. 55-65, in Bogotá. Patricia Duque is the current Minister of Sports, having served since February 2025.

== Structure ==
The Ministry of Sport is made up of the Office of the Minister, the advisory offices, the General Secretariat and the Vice Ministry of Sport, as follows:

- Office of the Minister of Sport
  - Planning Advisory Office
  - Legal Advisory Office
  - Internal Control Office
  - Advisory Office of Internal Disciplinary Control
  - General Secretary
- Office of the Vice Minister of Sport
  - Direction of Positioning and Sports Leadership
  - Inspection, Surveillance and Control Directorate
  - Department of Promotion and Development
  - Directorate of Resources and Tools of the National Sports System

== List of Ministers of Sports ==
Name	Assumed office	Left office	President(s) served under
Ernesto Lucena	September 16, 2019	July 14, 2021	Iván Duque
Gullermo Herrera	July 23, 2021	August 7, 2022	Iván Duque
María Isabel Urrutia	August 11, 2022	March 7, 2023	Gustavo Petro
Astrid Rodríguez	March 7, 2023	February 15, 2024	Gustavo Petro
Luz Cristina López	March 4, 2024	August 7, 2026	Gustavo Petro

== See also ==
- Coldeportes
- Colombian Olympic Committee
- Colombian Paralympic Committee
