= Administrative Department of Science, Technology and Innovation =

Colombian government agency

- Departamento Administrativo de Ciencia, Tecnología e Innovación
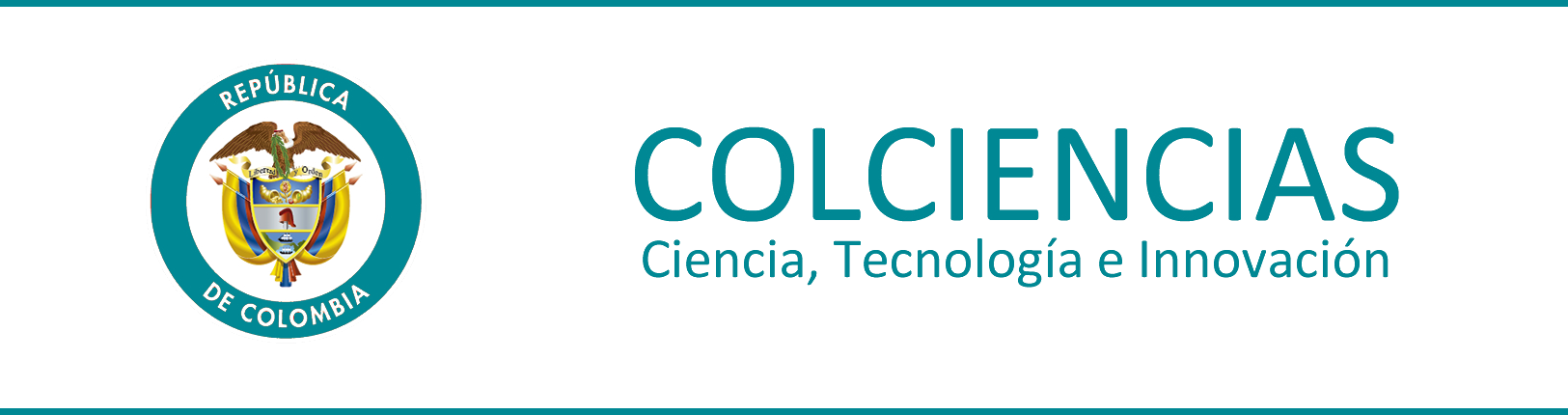

Agency overview
- Formed: January 23, 2009
- Preceding agency: Colombian Institute for the Development of Science and Technology Francisco José de Caldas
- Dissolved: December 06, 2021
- Superseding agency: Ministry of Science, Technology and Innovation
- Annual budget: COP$148,292,622,987,234 (est. 2010)
- Parent agency: National Planning Department
- Key document: Ley 1286 de 2009

The Administrative Department of Science, Technology and Innovation (Spanish: Departamento Administrativo de Ciencia, Tecnología e Innovación), also known as Colciencias, was a Colombian government agency that supported fundamental and applied research in Colombia. The department was officially integrated into the newly established Ministry of Science, Technology, and Innovation. This integration was enacted through Law 2162 of 2021. The key purpose of this merger was to centralize and streamline efforts in these fields under one unified governmental entity. This change aimed to foster a more coordinated and strategic approach to science, technology, and innovation, thereby enhancing the efficiency and impact of governmental policies and initiatives in these crucial areas.
