= Patricia Duque =

Colombian business administrator and politician

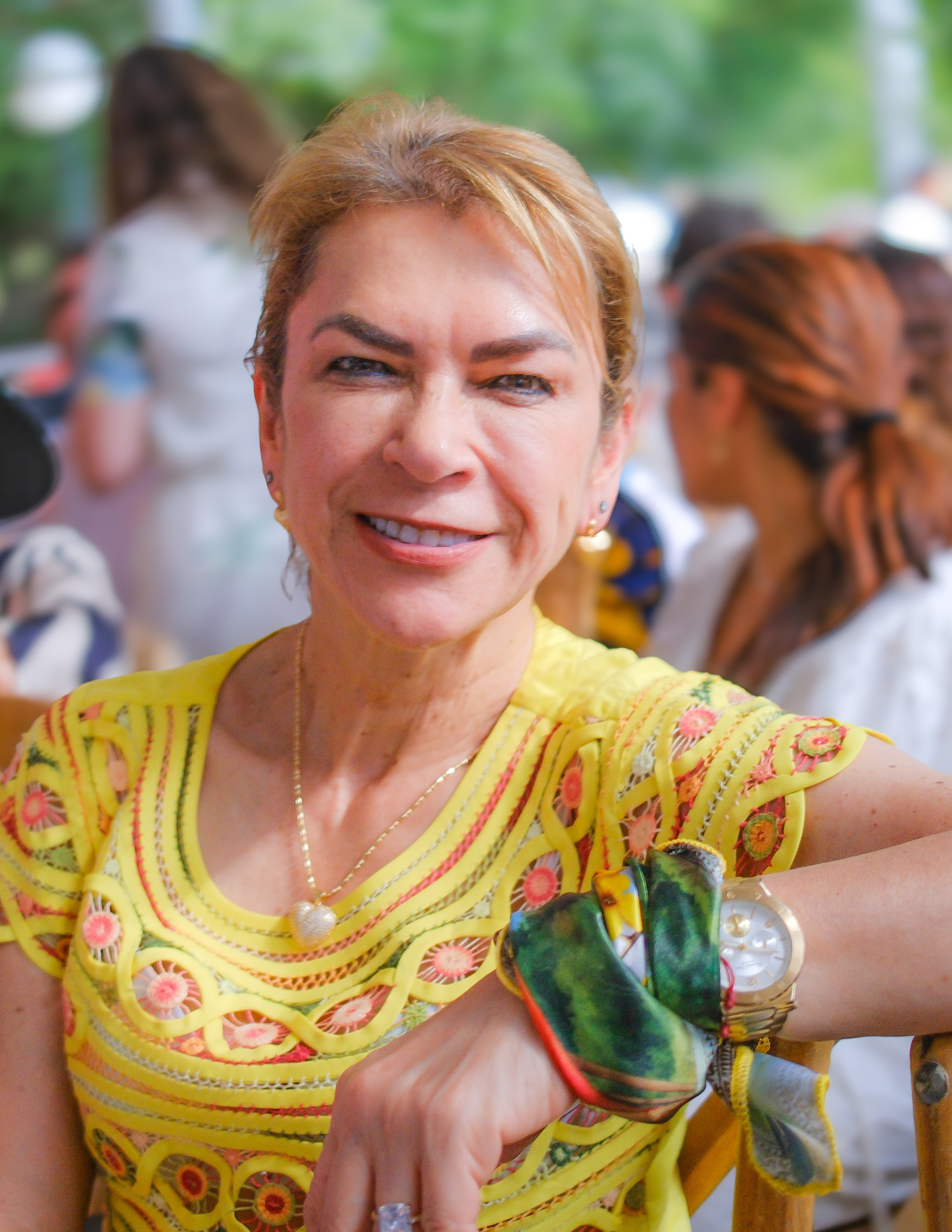
- Patricia Duque in 2025

Minister of Sports
- In office 4 March 2025 – 7 August 2026
- President: Gustavo Petro
- Preceded by: Luz Cristina López

Personal details
- Born: Cartago, Valle del Cauca, Colombia
- Party: Independent
- Education: Universidad Católica de Pereira; Central University of Colombia; New Granada Military University

Patricia Duque Cruz is a Colombian business administrator and politician. She has served as Minister of Sports of Colombia between 2025 and 2026.

== Early life ==
Duque was born in Cartago, Valle del Cauca, Colombia. She earned a degree in business administration from the Catholic University of Risaralda and specialized in administration and finance at the Central University and in administrative, economic, and financial sciences at the New Granada Military University.

== Career ==
She served as Bogotá’s local ombudswoman from 2003 to 2005, as the Bogotá City Council’s chief financial officer from 2005 to 2010, and as an advisor to the District Institute of Recreation and Sports (IDRD) from 2011 to 2012.

During the administration of President Juan Manuel Santos, she served as superintendent of Residential Public Utilities from 2013 to 2016. She also served as an advisor to the Bogotá Comptroller's Office until 2025, where she also worked until 2001.

Following the resignation of Luz Cristina López on 13 February 2025, President Gustavo Petro announced Duque as the new Minister of Sports. She was sworn in on 4 March 2025. Although she is an independent politician, she holds the seat on behalf of the Colombian Conservative Party.

== Personal life ==
She is married to Héctor Palau Saldarriaga, a well-known cycling commentator.
