= Colombian Institute of Culture =

- Instituto Colombiano de Cultura

Agency overview
- Formed: June 10, 1968
- Dissolved: 1997
- Headquarters: Bogotá, Colombia
- Parent agency: Ministry of Culture

The Colombian Institute of Culture (Spanish: Instituto Colombiano de Cultura; short name Colcultura) (1968–1997), was established by the Colombian government in 1968 to manage official activity in the cultural arena and to serve as a cultural intermediary between the government and the people.

The Institute was a division of the National Ministry of Education, charged with preserving, promoting, and encouraging Colombian popular, archeological, historical, and artistic culture. Main focus was to stimulate scientific research, reading by the public, and the spread of books, public libraries, cultural centers, and museums. It assisted the country's regional governments in setting up their own cultural programs. The Colombian Institute of Anthropology and History (ICANH) was part of the Colombian Institute of Culture.

In 1997, the national government created the Ministry of Culture, replacing the Institute. As a Ministry, the new organization could be larger and more powerful, covering other aspects of culture as well, such as ethnic groups, youth, and film production.
