= Ministry of Culture (Colombia) =

Government ministry of Colombia

Ministry of Cultures, Arts, and Knowledges
- Ministerio de las Culturas, las Artes y los Saberes

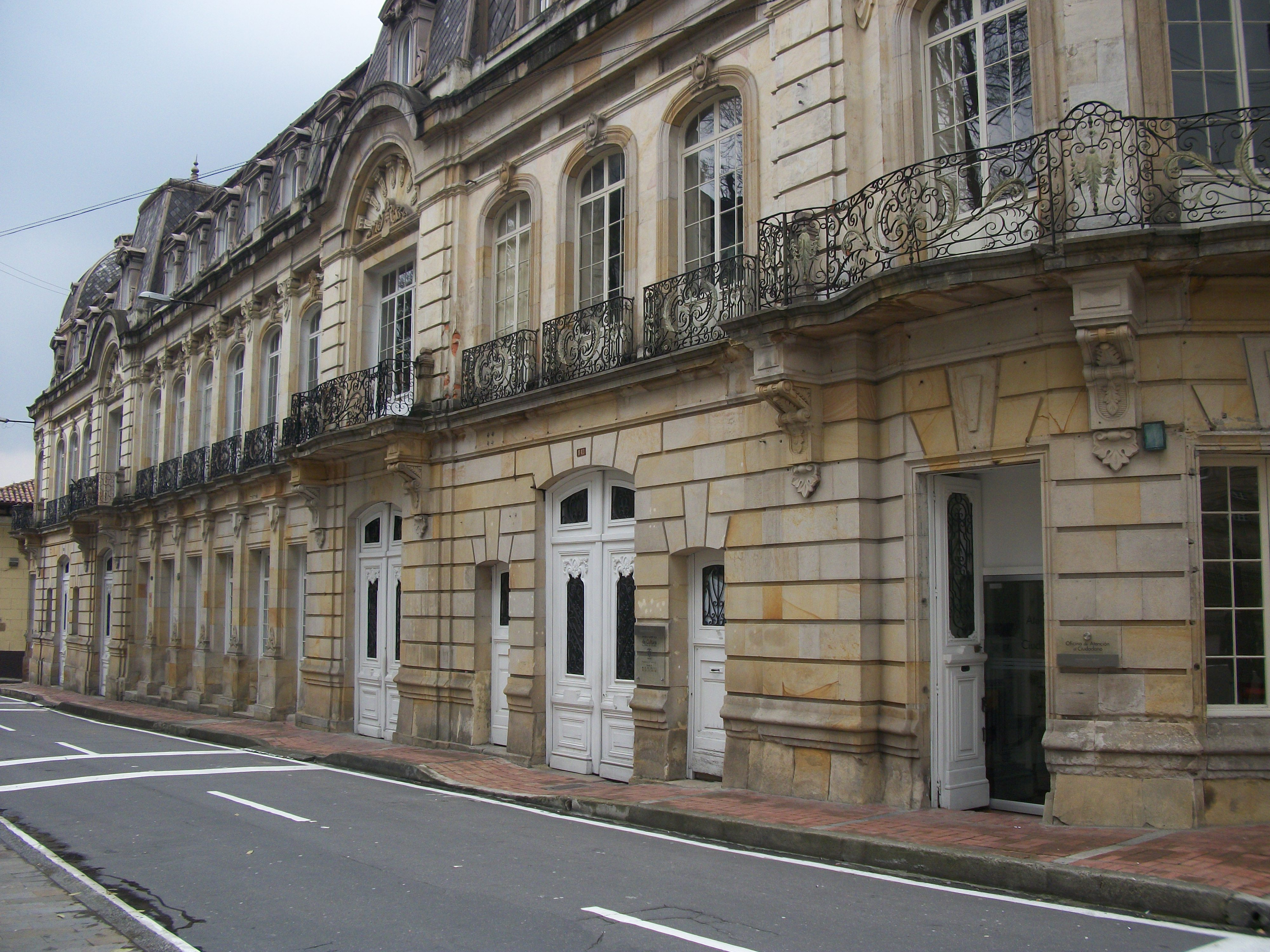
- Echeverry Palace, headquarters of the MinCulturas.

Ministry overview
- Formed: 7 August 1997
- Preceding Ministry: Colombian Institute of Culture
- Headquarters: Palacio Echeverry; Carrera 8 № 8-43; Bogotá, Colombia; 04°35′47.36″N 74°04′40.03″W
- Annual budget: COP$701,000,000,000 (2023)
- Ministry executive: Yannai Kadamani, Minister of Culture
- Website: www.mincultura.gov.co

The Ministry of Cultures, Arts, and Knowledges (Ministerio de las Culturas, las Artes y los Saberes; shortened to MinCulturas) is the national executive ministry of the Government of Colombia charged with preserving, promoting, and encouraging the growth, free expression and understanding of the culture of Colombia in all its multi-ethnic forms.

== Budget ==
Year	Budget (in COP$)	Ref.
2012	$256,723,246,372	
2013	$356,394,560,988	
2014	$354,451,666,369	
2023	$701,000,000,000	
