= Presidency of Juan Manuel Santos =

Colombian presidencial administration from 2010 to 2018

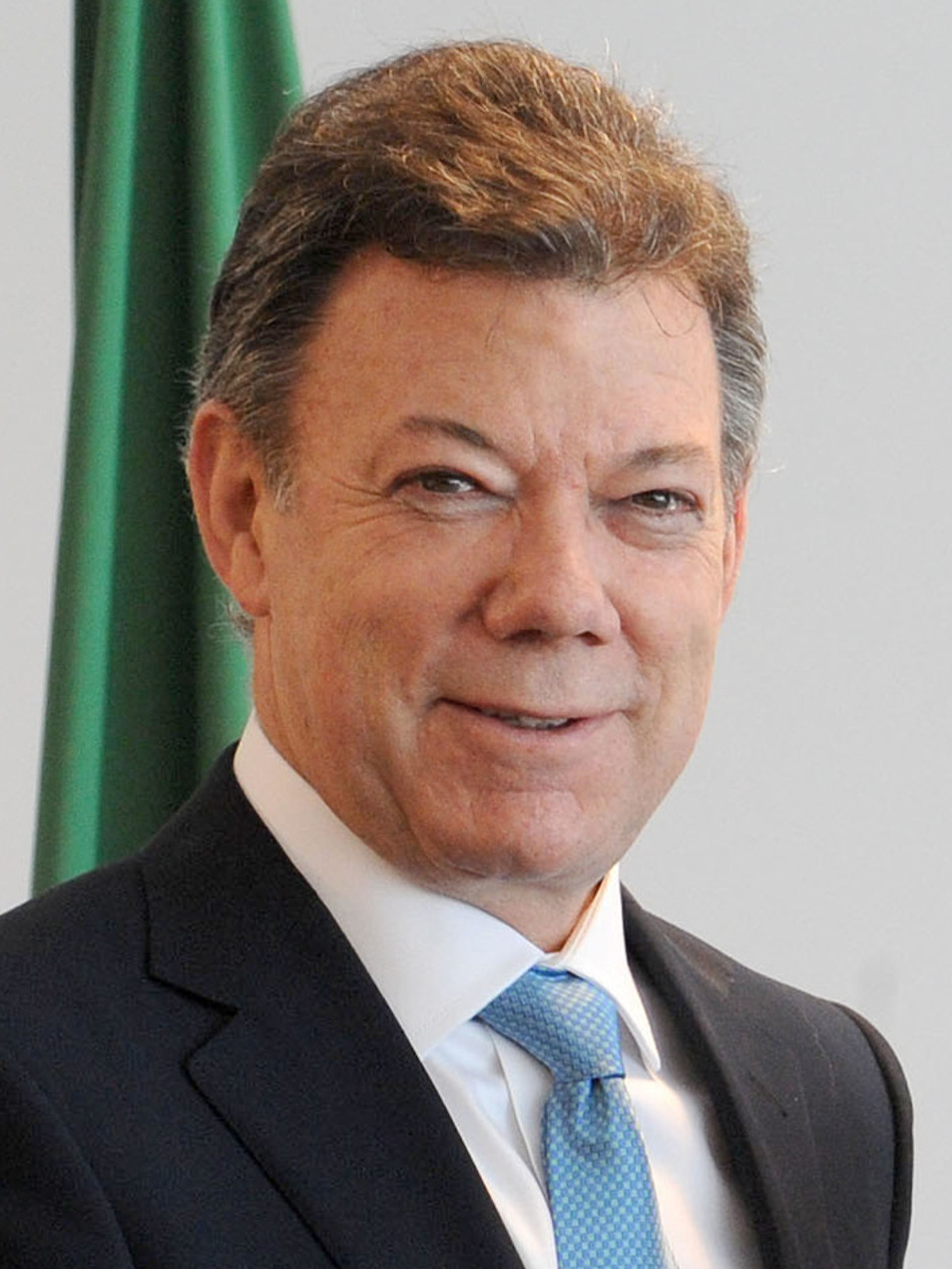
- Presidency of Juan Manuel Santos; 7 August 2010 – 7 August 2018
- Vice President: Angelino Garzón, Germán Vargas Lleras, Oscar Naranjo
- Cabinet: See list
- Party: Party of the U
- Election: 2010; 2014
- Seat: Casa de Nariño

Juan Manuel Santos's tenure as the 32nd president of Colombia began with his first inauguration on 7 August 2010, and ended on 7 August 2018. Santos, a center-right politician from Bogotá, took office after a landslide victory over the leftist leader. Antanas Mockus in the 2010 presidential election. Four years later, in the 2014 presidential election, he defeated the Democratic Center candidate Óscar Iván Zuluaga to win re-election. Santos was succeeded by right-wing leader Iván Duque, who won the 2018 presidential election.

In 2010, Santos won the presidential election as the protégé of Uribe. Some months after Santos' possession, Uribe became his strongest opponent, and also founded three years later the opposition party Democratic Center. This rivalry determined both Santos' unpopularity and his near-missed defeat during the 2014 Colombian presidential election against Uribe's protégé Óscar Iván Zuluaga.

On 7 October 2016, Santos was announced as recipient of the Nobel Peace Prize for his efforts negotiating a peace treaty with the FARC guerrillas in the country, despite his defeat in the referendum held over the deal, where the "No" campaign led by Uribe's Democratic Center won. The Colombian government and the FARC signed a revised peace deal on 24 November and sent it to Congress for ratification instead of conducting a second referendum. Both houses of Congress ratified the revised peace accord on 29–30 November 2016, marking an end to the conflict. The treaty brought deep divisions and polarization in the country, which questions its legitimacy. Santos has been named as one of Time's 100 most influential people. Santos left office with one of the lowest levels of popular approval ever, and his successor was Uribe's new protégé, Iván Duque, a moderate critic of Santos' peace treaty with the FARC guerillas.

== Election ==
Santos achieved a landslide victory, with 69 per cent of the votes. Mockus got 27.51 per cent of votes. This was the largest margin of victory for a president in the democratic period of Colombia's history. Santos won 32 of the country's 33 electoral districts. His allies have an overwhelming majority in the Colombian Congress. Santos vowed to continue his predecessor's hardline stance against the country's Marxist rebels. He paraphrased Isaac Newton – "If we have come far it's because we are standing on the shoulders of giants" – and said he would rid Colombia of what he described as the "nightmare of violence".

The United States State Department said it was "pleased" with the election of Santos and praised the "spirited debate" before the runoff and Colombia's "longstanding commitment to democratic principles".

== Administration ==
=== Cabinet ===
Office	Name	Term
President	Juan Manuel Santos	August 7, 2010 – August 7, 2018
Vice President	Angelino Garzón	August 7, 2010 – August 7, 2014
Vice President	Germán Vargas Lleras	August 7, 2014 – March 21, 2017
Vice President	Óscar Naranjo	March 29, 2017 – August 7, 2018
Minister of the Interior and Justice	Germán Vargas Lleras	August 7, 2010 – August 11, 2011
Minister of the Interior	Germán Vargas Lleras	August 11, 2011 – May 21, 2012
Minister of the Interior	Federico Renjifo	May 21, 2012 – September 3, 2012
Minister of the Interior	Fernando Carrillo	September 3, 2012 – September 11, 2013
Minister of the Interior	Aurelio Iragorri	September 11, 2011 – August 7, 2014
Minister of the Interior	Juan Fernando Cristo	August 7, 2014 – May 25, 2017
Minister of the Interior	Guillermo Rivera	May 25, 2017 – August 7, 2018
Minister of Foreign Affairs	María Ángela Holguín	August 7, 2010 – August 7, 2018
Minister of Finance and Public Credit	Juan Carlos Echeverry	August 7, 2010 – September 3, 2012
Minister of Finance and Public Credit	Mauricio Cárdenas	September 3, 2012 – August 7, 2018
Minister of Justice and Law	Juan Carlos Esguerra	August 11, 2011 – July 12, 2012
Minister of Justice and Law	Ruth Stella Correa	July 12, 2012 – September 13, 2013
Minister of Justice and Law	Alfonso Gómez Méndez	September 13, 2013 – August 11, 2014
Minister of Justice and Law	Yesid Reyes	August 11, 2014 – April 25, 2016
Minister of Justice and Law	Jorge Eduardo Londoño	April 25, 2016 – March 1, 2017
Minister of Justice and Law	Enrique Gil Botero	March 9, 2017 – August 7, 2018
Minister of National Defence	Rodrigo Rivera	August 7, 2010 – September 5, 2011
Minister of National Defence	Juan Carlos Pinzón	September 5, 2011 – June 22, 2015
Minister of National Defence	Luis Carlos Villegas	June 22, 2015 – August 7, 2018
Minister of Agriculture and Rural Development	Juan Camilo Restrepo	August 7, 2010 – June 2, 2013
Minister of Agriculture and Rural Development	Francisco Estupiñán	June 2, 2013 – September 13, 2013
Minister of Agriculture and Rural Development	Rubén Darío Lizarralde	

== First term ==
Santos said he would run for the Colombian presidency in 2010, according to him, if President Álvaro Uribe did not do so if a referendum was approved that would allow him to serve as president for the third time. After the Constitutional Court of Colombia determined that the re-election referendum was unconstitutional and unenforceable, Santos announced his presidential aspirations for the period 2010–2014 on behalf of the U party. Santos led the polls with Green Party candidate Antanas Mockus as possible options to win the Presidency of Colombia.

Santos's presidential campaign was based on continuing with the democratic security policy, implemented during the eight years of the Uribe government. Santos selected the ex-minister and ex-governor of Valle, Angelino Garzón, as the vice-presidential formula.

Santos shaking hands with the President of the Spanish Government, J.L. Rodríguez Zapatero in June 2010. Santos had the support of important sectors of the Liberal Party, the formal adherence Cambio Radical (third in the first round) and the Conservative Party (fifth) in this second round.

On May 30, 2010, Santos obtained 46.56% of the valid votes, so he agreed to the second round of elections, against the Colombian Green Party candidate Antanas Mockus, which took place on June 20. That day and with 68.9% of the vote (9,004,221 votes out of a total vote of 14 million), he emerged victorious for the post of president of Colombia against his rival.

Santos' first foray outside of Bogotá, already inaugurated as president, was in La Mojana Sucreña, in San Jorge, a region in northern Colombia severely hit by floods. The Colombian government estimated that more than 160 thousand people from the municipalities of Sucre, Guaranda, San Benito Abad and Majagual, in the department of Sucre; as well as San Jacinto del Cauca and Achí, in the department of Bolívar; and Ayapel, in the department of Córdoba were affected, in the department of Putumayo he had to face the tragedy of Mocoa.

== Second term ==
From the beginning of the government of Juan Manuel Santos, speculation began about the possible candidates for the Presidency.9 2013 was the decisive year for the definition of the candidacies for the 2014 elections.

Within the government coalition, reunited under the name of National Unity, not only was the possibility that the president aspired for re-election sounded, but there was also speculation that government allies such as the former Minister of Housing, Germán Vargas Lleras, the vice president, Angelino Garzón, and the retired general of the Police, Óscar Naranjo, could aspire to the Presidency of the Republic. None of these speculations could be confirmed until November 20, 2013, when the current president publicly announced his intention to run for re-election for the 2014–2018 period.12 Juan Manuel Santos' candidacy for re-election was supported by the Liberal parties, 1314 of the U and Radical Change.15

== Domestic policy ==
=== Security ===
Continuing with his predecessor's democratic security policy, Santos promised from his inauguration speech to fight narco-terrorist groups without truce. On August 12, 2010, there was an attack on Caracol Radio whose authorship was attributed to the FARC-EP, in addition this group carried out a series of attacks on members of the National Police as a welcome to the Santos government. From Montería, President Santos expressed;

On September 19, 2010, the Military and Police Forces bombed a camp of the 48th Front of the FARC-EP where its commander Domingo Biojó died,8 and on September 23 Operation Sodoma was carried out, in which Jorge Briceño Suárez, alias El Mono Jojoy, military chief of the FARC-EP.9 On November 4, 2011, within the framework of Operation Odysseus, Guillermo León Sáenz, alias Alfonso Cano, who had served until that moment as commander-in-chief of the FARC-EP after the death of Manuel Marulanda due to natural causes.10 He would be succeeded in the command of the FARC-EP by Rodrigo Londoño 'Timochenko'. 11

In his government, the Victims and Land Restitution Law (Law 1448 of 2011) was approved, to restore, through the Unit for the Attention and Comprehensive Reparation of Victims, the lands seized by the armed actors (paramilitary and guerrilla groups ) to civilian victims of the war and recognizing the existence of the internal armed conflict in Colombia.12

Regarding the fight against Criminal Bands (BACRIM) or Organized Armed Groups (GAO), as the government has called them since March 2016 to empower the Military Forces to combat these criminal groups13 supporting the National Police; He managed to dismantle three dangerous criminal gangs, one of them with a nationwide presence: Los Rastrojos. In February 2015, he ordered the dismantling of the GAO Clan del Golfo or self-styled Gaitanista Self-Defense Forces of Colombia (AGC), led by Dairo Antonio Úsuga David, alias Otoniel, in Operation Agamemnon (reinforced and continued in the next government). In the Solemn Operation of October 2015, Víctor Ramón Navarro Serrano 'Megateo', commander of the dissidence of the Popular Liberation Army (EPL): GAO 'Los Pelusos' dedicated to drug trafficking, was killed.14 Since November 2017, the dissident groups they are considered Residual Organized Armed Groups (GAOR), fought by the Military Forces.1516

== Peace agreements with the FARC-EP ==
Shortly after assuming his mandate, Juan Manuel Santos began rapprochement with the FARC-EP in order to end the most important confrontation of the Colombian internal armed conflict. The peace talks began with exploratory meetings on March 1, 2011, and on October 18, 2012, the talks were established in Oslo, Norway. On August 24, 2016, the delegations of the Government of Colombia and the FARC-EP announced that they had reached a final, comprehensive and definitive agreement, which was signed in Cartagena de Indias on September 26, 2016, but was not ratified by a narrow margin in the referendum plebiscite on October 2, 2016.

In the following days, Santos began to negotiate with the opposition possible changes to the peace agreement with the FARC-EP. On November 12, a month and a half after the plebiscite, the renegotiation and modification of the agreements with the FARC-EP taking into account the arguments and objections of the promoters of the NO, ratified the agreement in Congress for its implementation as of December 1 of that year.

This agreement earned Juan Manuel Santos the 2016 Nobel Peace Prize. The announcement of the award was made at 11:00 a.m. (CEST) on Friday, October 7, 2016, by the chairperson of the Norwegian Parliament Committee for the Prize Nobel Peace Prize winner, Kaci Kullmann Five, who stated:

Despite these achievements, President Santos officially announced in March 2016 the start of peace talks with the other guerrilla in the country, the National Liberation Army (ELN), after more than two years of exploratory phase to discuss an agenda of possible points for an eventual peace process; however, the start of the talks was suspended until the ELN released the hostages it had in its possession. After the release of the former Chocoano congressman, Odin Sanchez, on February 4, 2017, on the 7th of that month, the conversation table with the armed group was officially established and, in this way, try to definitively end the conflict armed with left-leaning guerrillas.

== Foreign policy ==
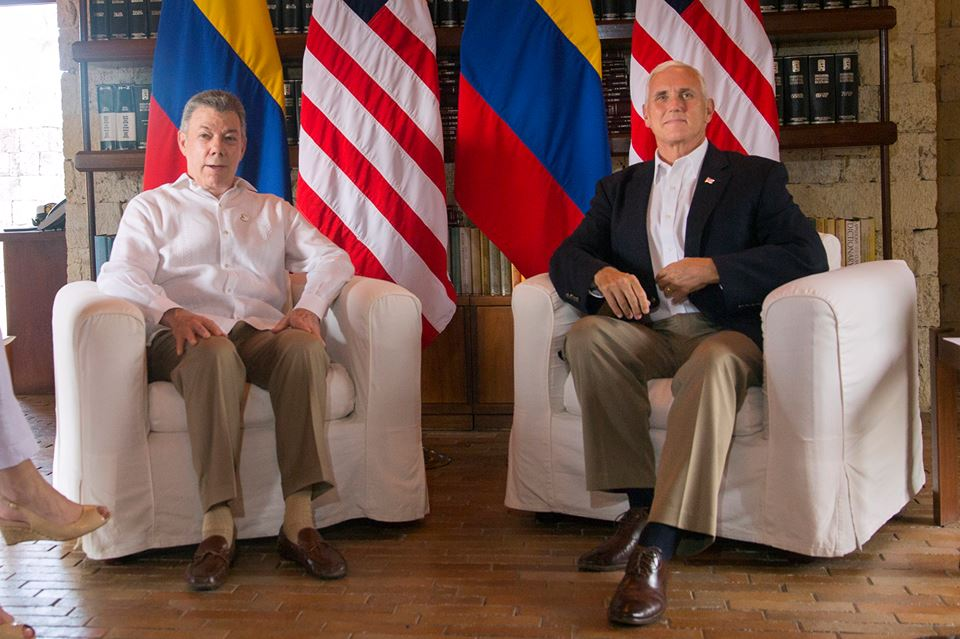
Santos with US Vice President Mike Pence in Cartagena, 13 August 2017

After the diplomatic crisis between Colombia and Venezuela broke out in July 2010, Santos decided not to issue statements on the matter, arguing that President Uribe was still the acting president. Santos, who was on a tour of Latin America visiting heads of state, also met privately with Unasur Secretary General Néstor Kirchner and his wife, Argentine President Cristina Fernández de Kirchner to discuss the crisis. On August 10, 2010, President Santos and President Chávez met in Santa Marta to discuss the crisis.

During his tenure, on November 19, 2012, the International Court of Justice issued a historic ruling on the border dispute with Nicaragua, ratifying Colombian sovereignty over seven keys of the San Andrés y Providencia archipelago, fixing the border but with a significant loss 40% of territorial sea for Colombia.

His last determination, in matters of foreign relations, occurred on August 3, 2018, when he recognized Palestine as a "free, independent and sovereign State"; in contrast to what he had stated on April 18, 2018, during an event commemorating the seventieth anniversary of the creation of the State of Israel. On that occasion, Santos stated:

However, a few days after finishing his second Government, he changed his mind. A change that was only announced on Wednesday, August 8, one day after the inauguration of the new president Iván Duque Márquez, through a statement from the Palestinian Diplomatic Mission in Colombia, a fact that caused a stir in some sectors of the public opinion, since, among other things, Foreign Minister María Ángela Holguín, when asked about the issue on August 6, 2018 (last day of her administration), in an interview with Vicky Dávila for W Radio, refused to make public the president's decision that had already been materialized by then. When the news was released, the incoming Minister of Foreign Affairs, Carlos Holmes Trujillo, acknowledged that the new Executive had been previously informed and that, in the interests of Colombia, the decision that deprived the country of the particularity of being the only one in South America that had not recognized the Palestinian state.
