= List of ministers of justice and law of Colombia =

The following is a list of ministers of justice and law of Colombia.

Period	Minister	Government
1830-1831	Estanislao Vergara y Sanz de Santamaría	Rafael Urdaneta
1890	José María González Valencia	Carlos Holguín Mallarino
1892	Luis Antonio Mesa	Carlos Holguín Mallarino
1892–1894	Emilio Ruiz Barreto	Miguel Antonio Caro
1946	Arturo Tapias Pilonieta	Mariano Ospina Pérez
1947	Alejandro Cabal Pombo	Mariano Ospina Pérez
1947	Samuel Arango Reyes	Mariano Ospina Pérez
1947	José Antonio Montalvo	Mariano Ospina Pérez
1948	Samuel Arango Reyes	Mariano Ospina Pérez
1949–1950	Miguel San Juan	Mariano Ospina Pérez
1950	Pedro Manuel Arenas Osses	Mariano Ospina Pérez
1950–1951	Guillermo Amaya Ramirez	Laureano Gómez
1951–1952	Juan Uribe Holguín	Laureano Gómez
1952–1953	José Gabriel de la Vega	Roberto Urdaneta
1953–1954	Antonio Escobar Camargo	Roberto Urdaneta
1954	Gabriel París	Gustavo Rojas Pinilla
1954–1956	Luis Caro Escallon	Gustavo Rojas Pinilla
1956	Pedro Manuel Arenas Osses	Gustavo Rojas Pinilla
1956–1957	Luis Carlos Giraldo	Gustavo Rojas Pinilla
1957	Gral. Alfredo Duarte Blum	Junta Militar de Colombia
1957	José María Villareal	Junta Militar de Colombia
1958	Fernando Isaza	Junta Militar de Colombia
1958	Rodrigo Noguera Laborde	Junta Militar de Colombia
1958–1960	Germán Zea Hernández	Alberto Lleras Camargo
1960	Alfredo Araújo Grau	Alberto Lleras Camargo
1960	Ignacio Reyes Posada	Alberto Lleras Camargo
1960	Eliseo Arango	Alberto Lleras Camargo
1960	Victor Mosquera Chaux	Alberto Lleras Camargo
1960–1962	Vicente Laverde Aponte	Alberto Lleras Camargo
1962–1963	Héctor Charry Samper	Guillermo León Valencia
1963–1965	Alfredo Araújo Grau	Guillermo León Valencia
1965	Raimundo Emiliani Román	Guillermo León Valencia
1965–1966	Fernando Posada de la Peña	Guillermo León Valencia
1966–1967	Hernán Salamanca	Carlos Lleras Restrepo
1967–1968	Darío Echandía	Carlos Lleras Restrepo
1968–1970	Fernando Hinestrosa Forero	Carlos Lleras Restrepo
1970–1973	Miguel Escobar Méndez	Misael Pastrana Borrero
1973–1974	Jaime Castro Castro	Misael Pastrana Borrero
1974–1976	Alberto Santofimio Botero	Alfonso López Michelsen
1976	Samuel Hoyos Arango	Alfonso López Michelsen
1976	Víctor Renán Barco	Alfonso López Michelsen
1976–1978	César Gómez Estrada	Alfonso López Michelsen
1978–1980	Hugo Escobar Sierra	Julio César Turbay
1980–1982	Felio Andrade Manrique	Julio César Turbay
1982–1983	Bernardo Gaitán Mahecha	Belisario Betancur
1983–1984	Rodrigo Lara Bonilla (murdered in office)	Belisario Betancur
1984–1986	Enrique Parejo González	Belisario Betancur
1986–1987	José Manuel Arias Carrizosa	Virgilio Barco
1987	Edmundo López Gómez	Virgilio Barco
1987	Eduardo Suescún Monroy	Virgilio Barco
1987–1989	Enrique Low Murtra	Virgilio Barco
1989–1990	Mónica de Greiff	Virgilio Barco
1990	Roberto Salazar Manrique	Virgilio Barco
1990–1991	Jaime Giraldo Ángel	César Gaviria
1991–1992	Fernando Carrillo Flórez	César Gaviria
1992–1994	Andrés González Díaz	César Gaviria
1994–1996	Néstor Humberto Martínez	Ernesto Samper
1996–1997	Carlos Medellín Becerra	Ernesto Samper
1997–1998	Alma Beatriz Rengifo López	Ernesto Samper
1998–1999	Parmenio Cuéllar Bastidas	Andrés Pastrana
1999–2002	Rómulo González Trujillo	Andrés Pastrana
2002–2003	Fernando Londoño Hoyos	Álvaro Uribe
2003–2006	Sabas Pretelt de la Vega	Álvaro Uribe
2006–2008	Fabio Valencia Cossio	Álvaro Uribe
2008–2010	Carlos Holguín Sardi	Álvaro Uribe
2010–2011	Germán Vargas Lleras	Juan Manuel Santos
2011–2012	Juan Carlos Esguerra	Juan Manuel Santos
2012–2013	Ruth Stella Correa	Juan Manuel Santos
2013–2014	Alfonso Gómez Méndez	Juan Manuel Santos
2014–2016	Yesid Reyes Alvarado	Juan Manuel Santos
2016–2017	Jorge Eduardo Londoño	Juan Manuel Santos
2017–2018	Enrique Gil Botero	Juan Manuel Santos
2018–2019	Gloria Maria Borrero	Ivan Duque Marquez
2019–2020	Margarita Cabello Blanco	Ivan Duque Marquez
2020–2020	Javier Sarmiento	Ivan Duque Marquez
2020–2020	Wilson Ruiz Orejuela	Ivan Duque Marquez

- Fernando Londono Hoyos was referred to as the Minister of the Interior and in charge of Justice and later as Minister of the Interior and Justice. His successors Sabas Pretelt de la Vega, Fabio Valencia Cossio, Carlos Holguin Sardi and German Vargas Lleras also had the same title.
- During his tenure, Lleras would be known as the Minister of Interior that oversaw Justice.

== See also ==
- Anexo:Ministros de Justicia de Colombia (Annex: Ministers of Justice of Colombia)
- Ministry of Justice and Law (Colombia)
- Justice ministry
- Politics of Colombia
