= Juan Carlos Galindo =

Colombian civil servant

Juan Carlos Galindo Vacha (Bogotá) (1962-) is the current head of Registraduría Nacional del Estado Civil, replacing Alma Beatriz Rengifo in 2006. He was in charge of presidential elections in 2006 and is the most important figure in the national organization.
