= Rengifo =

Rengifo is a surname. Notable people with the surname include:

- Alma Beatriz Rengifo (1953–2015), Colombian lawyer and politician
- César Rengifo (1915–1980), Venezuelan painter, writer, poet and journalist
- Federico Rengifo, 25th Ambassador of Colombia to France
- Hernán Rengifo (born 1983), Peruvian footballer
- Luis Rengifo (born 1997), Venezuelan baseball player
- Manuel Rengifo (1793–1845), Chilean politician
- Raúl Gonzalo Cuero Rengifo, African Colombian professor of microbiology
- Tomás Rengifo, Salvadoran former swimmer
- Ana Rengifo (born 1994), Colombian bookkeeper.

== See also ==
- FAP Captain David Abensur Rengifo International Airport (IATA: PCL, ICAO: SPCL), Pucallpa, Ucayali Region, Peru
- Moisés Benzaquén Rengifo Airport (IATA: YMS, ICAO: SPMS), Yurimaguas, a town on the Huallaga River, Loreto Region, Peru
- RENGO
- Rengo
