= Cannabis trafficking penalties for juveniles =

This page is about the penalties juveniles are subject to if found guilty of trafficking Cannabis. Most juveniles suffer the same, or very similar, penalties as adults. However this varies between countries, cultures and according to where the nation's minimum age of criminal responsibility lies. Information and laws regarding minors are difficult to find as they are usually classified or protected. This is due to laws preventing crimes committed, under the minimum age of criminal responsibility, being kept on a criminal record.

In some countries, possession or trafficking of Cannabis (also known as Marijuana, Hashish, Weed, Grass, Pot) is an outrageous felony, punishable with life sentences or the death penalty. Other countries (mainly in the western world) consider cannabis a recreational drug and in the last decade some have even decriminalised the use of Cannabis and allow it to be used for medical purposes. Penalties for possession or trafficking of Cannabis vary a lot.

== Minimum ages of criminal responsibility ==
=== Europe ===
==== Switzerland ====
Children can be held liable for a criminal offence from the age of 10.

==== United Kingdom ====
===== England =====
Children can be held liable for a criminal offence from the age of 10.

===== Wales =====
Children can be held liable for a criminal offence from the age of 10.

===== Northern Ireland =====
Children can be held liable for a criminal offence from the age of 10.

===== Scotland =====
Children can be held liable for a criminal offence from the age of 8. Children under the age of 12 may not be prosecuted for a criminal offence.

=== Asia ===
==== Afghanistan ====
Children can be held liable for a criminal offence from the age 12.

==== Saudi Arabia ====
Children can be held liable for a criminal offence from the age of 12, however girls and in qisas cases can be held criminal liable from the age 7.

==== Singapore ====
Children can be held liable for a criminal offence from the age of 7.

==== China ====
===== Mainland China =====
Children can be held liable for a criminal offence from the age of 16. Children, however, can be held criminally responsible for intentional homicide, intentionally hurting another person to cause severe injuries or death, rape, robbery, drug-trafficking, arson, explosions or poisoning from the age of 14.

===== Hong Kong =====
Children can be held liable for a criminal offence form the age of 10.

===== Macao =====
Children can be held liable for a criminal offence from the age of 12, however no child under the age of 16 can be subject to criminal penalties.

=== Americas ===
==== United States ====
In 33 states no minimum age of criminal responsibility has been set. Of the states that do set a minimum age of criminal responsibility, North Carolina has the lowest at the age of 7 and Wisconsin has the highest at the age of 10.

==== Colombia ====
Children can be held liable for a criminal offence by the age of 14, but they are subject to the Juvenile Penal Responsibility System, under which they do not establish a criminal record.

== Judicial systems ==
=== Europe ===
==== Switzerland ====
The political structure of Switzerland consists of three different political levels: the Confederation, the 26 cantons, and the local authorities. The Confederation only has authority where it is empowered by the Constitution, the Cantons deal with all the other tasks. In some areas, the Confederation and the cantons share certain responsibilities. The organisation of the courts and the jurisdiction in civil and criminal matters stays with the cantons.

The Swiss court system is divided into civil, criminal, and administrative courts. Cantonal courts apply federal law when dealing with civil and criminal matters. The Swiss Federal Supreme Court is primarily a court of last resort.

The juridical system is organised in three grades of judgement: 1 Trial (First Instance – cantonal level), 2 Appeal (Second Instance – cantonal level), 3 Federal Supreme Court (Third and last Instance – federal level).

If a minor incurs in any unlawful importation of narcotic, thus including cannabis, sanctions will be decided on the quantity by a judge of minors in the concerned canton.

==== England ====
England's judicial system is structured as follows; magistrates' courts, which deals with less serious crimes, and the Crown Court, which deals with more serious crimes. The accused or the prosecution may appeal to the High Court if they don't agree with the trial's outcome. If the accused or prosecution don't accept the High Court's outcome, they may take their case to the Court of Appeal. Once the Court of Appeal has made a decision, further appeals to the Supreme Court will only be heard if the case meets the regulations as outlined in the Criminal Appeal Act 1968 and the Administration of Justice Act 1960.

Criminal cases involving minors are tried in a magistrates' court and are usually completed there, in exceptional cases of general public importance youth offenders may be tried at a higher level.

Criminal cases involving drugs are tried in the Crown Court and may be appealed in higher courts as well.

=== Asia ===
==== Saudi Arabia ====
The Saudi judicial system is based on Sharia law, it is divided in two sections: Public Right and Private Right.

The Private Right section allows an individual to claim restitution from another person if they are injured, as a result of the accused actions. It also gives the injured person legal heirs the right to either claim or waive the right to claim compensation or the imposition of the death penalty.

The Public Right section allows the judicial authorities to pursue and prosecute an individual suspected of committing a criminal act.

Civil 'Private Right' cases are bail-able but Criminal 'Public Right' cases are not. A person accused of a Private Right offence would be asked to provide either financial guarantee or an appearance guarantee, or both.

==== Singapore ====
The Singapore Judicial System consists of the Supreme Court and the State Courts. The Supreme Court hears both civil and criminal cases and consists of the Court of Appeal and the High Court. The Court of Appeal exercises appellate criminal and civil jurisdiction, while the High Court exercises both original and appellate criminal and civil jurisdiction.

The Juvenile Court is the State Court which takes care of offences committed by minors. It is empowered to deal with juvenile offenders by putting them under the care of someone else as deemed fit. The court can also give community service orders, probation orders, as well as require the offender to undergo detention and reformative training.

=== Americas ===
==== United States of America ====
The USA judicial system consists of three main components: the law enforcement, the courts and the Corrections. Crimes fall under two main categories: misdemeanour's, which is less serious and felony, which is more serious. The USA's court system is structured as follows; county courts, state courts and federal courts. The federal courts consist of the Supreme Court and the lower courts (trial courts and appeal courts). The Supreme Court can overthrow any lower courts decision. Criminal cases are usually tried at the state level. If at the end of the trial the defendant is found guilty, he can appeal to the lower courts at federal level.

To decide whether to commence trial proceedings, the US Attorney must provide the grand jury with all evidence against the defendant, so they may decide whether the defendant is required to stand trial. Depending on the charges the judge decides whether the defendant should be held in Jail until trial (cases can take up to 18 months before going to trial). Before a trial the defendant is often offered a plea bargain by the US Attorney, if the defendant accepts the plea bargain the case is not taken to trial.

During a criminal trial it is the government's duty to provide the trial with evidence proving the defendant's guilt, the defendant does not need provide evidence to prove innocence. If at the end of the trial the defendant is not found guilty, he is released and the prosecution may not appeal.

==== Colombia ====
The Colombian judicial system is made of a Constitutional Court, Supreme Court of Justice, Council of State, the Higher Judiciary Council, and superior and municipal courts. It does not have a single supreme entity to oversee the lower courts, instead it has four high courts, which are the supreme tribunals of decision in their respective fields. The four high courts are the Constitutional Court (head of the constitutional jurisdiction), the Supreme Court (head of the ordinary jurisdiction), the Council of State (head of the administrative jurisdiction), and the Superior Council of Judicature (head of the disciplinary jurisdiction).

== Penalties for import of Marijuana WP ==
=== Europe ===
==== Switzerland ====
Trafficking of Marijuana in Switzerland is punished with a 1 to 3 year prison sentence and a fine.

==== England ====
Marijuana is considered a Class B drug. Trafficking of a Class B drug can result in up to 14 years in prison, an unlimited fine, or both.

=== Asia ===
==== Saudi Arabia ====
Trafficking of Marijuana in Saudi Arabia is punished by public flogging, fines, lengthy imprisonment, or death.

==== Singapore ====
Trafficking of Marijuana in Singapore is punished with the death penalty.

===== China =====
Marijuana is classified as a Class A drug under the Misuse of Drugs Act. Trafficking of more than 500 grams of Marijuana is punished with the death penalty.

=== Americas ===
==== United States ====
Federal Penalties for Trafficking of a Mixture of Marijuana.
Offence Committed	First Offence	Second Offence
Trafficking of less than 50 kilograms of marijuana.	Up to 5 years in prison and a fine of up to $250,000.	Up to 10 years in prison and a fine of $500,000.
Trafficking of 50 to 99 kilograms of marijuana.	Up to 20 years in prison and a fine of $1 million.	Up to 30 years in prison and a fine of $2 million.
Trafficking of 100 to 999 kilograms of marijuana.	5 to 40 years in prison and a fine of up to $5 million.	From 10 years to life in prison and a fine of up to $8 million.
Trafficking of 1000 kilograms or more of marijuana.	From 10 years to life in prison and a fine of up to$10 million.	From 20 years to life in prison and a fine of up to $20 million.

==== Colombia ====
It is legal to possess up to 20 grams or 20 plants of marijuana for personal use only. Marijuana is also legalized for medical and scientific purpose. Anyone trafficking marijuana for other purposes can expect long prison sentences from 4 to 20 years under harsh conditions. Colombian law also requires serious offenders to remain in the country to serve a lengthy parole (in which the offenders aren't given housing and might not be permitted to work) after their release from jail.

== See also ==
- Legality of cannabis by country
- Illegal drug trade
