= Estupiñán =

Estupiñán is a Spanish surname. Notable people with the surname include:

== Footballers ==
- Alfonso Estupiñán (born 1948), Costa Rican footballer
- Ítalo Estupiñán (1952–2016), Ecuadorian footballer
- Javier Estupiñán (born 1984), Colombian footballer
- Óscar Estupiñán (born 1996), Colombian footballer
- Pervis Estupiñán (born 1998), Ecuadorian footballer
- Víctor Estupiñán (born 1988), Ecuadorian footballer

== Other ==
- Ana María Estupiñán (born 1992), Colombian actress and singer
- Francisco Estupiñán Heredia, Colombian politician and banker
- Nelson Estupiñán Bass (1912–2002), Ecuadorian novelist
- Saskia Estupiñán, Ecuadorian dentist, public health official
