= Judicial districts of Colombia =

The judicial districts of Colombia are the territorial divisions into which the judicial branch is organized to determine the jurisdiction of its courts and offices. There is no single division; the ordinary jurisdiction, the administrative litigation jurisdiction, the disciplinary jurisdiction and the agrarian and rural jurisdiction each have their own territorial map.

In the ordinary jurisdiction, each district is seated in a Superior Tribunal, which is the functional superior of the courts in its territory; these courts are grouped into judicial circuits made up of municipalities. According to the Geographic Information System of the Judiciary, there are 34 districts and 203 circuits in the ordinary jurisdiction, and 27 districts in the administrative litigation jurisdiction, each with its own administrative tribunal. The disciplinary jurisdiction operates through 25 sectional commissions of judicial discipline, and the agrarian and rural jurisdiction, recently created, currently has one agrarian and rural judicial district.

== Legal framework ==
The Statutory Law on the Administration of Justice (Law 270 of 1996) regulates the "deconcentration and division of the territory for judicial purposes" (Article 50) and sets the rules for that division (Article 89). The law establishes that the superior tribunals, administrative tribunals and sectional councils of the judiciary have jurisdiction within their respective judicial or administrative district. Law 1285 of 2009, which amended Law 270, includes among the bodies of the ordinary jurisdiction the Supreme Court of Justice, the superior tribunals of judicial districts and the courts.

Statutory Law 2570 of 2026 amended Article 50 of Law 270 so that the territory is divided, for judicial purposes, into judicial districts, administrative judicial districts and agrarian and rural judicial districts, and established that the latter two are divided into circuits.

In practice, the judicial map is adjusted through agreements of the Superior Council of the Judiciary, which create or modify districts, circuits and offices.

== History ==
The division of the territory into judicial districts predates the 1991 Constitution. Law 63 of 1905 divided the territory of the Republic into judicial districts. Law 33 of 1935 established that the territory would be divided, for the administration of justice, into municipalities, judicial circuits and judicial districts.

In December 1996, following the enactment of Law 270, the Administrative Chamber of the Superior Council of the Judiciary published the New Judicial Map of Colombia.

Until 2022 the country had 33 ordinary judicial districts, a figure used, for example, to schedule the gradual entry of the districts into the oral system between 2011 and 2013. Agreement PCSJA22-12028, of 19 December 2022, created the Judicial District of San José del Guaviare, which began operating on 11 January 2023 and raised the total to 34. Its official opening took place on 10 August 2023.

== Judicial districts of the ordinary jurisdiction ==
=== Structure ===
The territorial organization of the ordinary jurisdiction has three levels:

- Municipality: seat of the municipal courts.
- Judicial circuit: groups several municipalities, with a seat in one of them, where the circuit courts operate.
- Judicial district: groups several circuits, with a seat where the Superior Tribunal operates.

A district does not necessarily coincide with departmental boundaries. Some departments are divided into several districts, such as Antioquia and Medellín, or Cali and Buga in Valle del Cauca. In addition, there are districts whose circuits include municipalities from more than one department, such as San José del Guaviare, which covers municipalities in Guaviare, Guainía, Vaupés and Meta.

=== Superior tribunals ===
A Superior Tribunal operates in each judicial district, created by the Superior Council of the Judiciary to perform the functions assigned to it by procedural law in its territory. Some superior tribunals also have jurisdiction beyond their district. For example, the specialized civil chambers for land restitution, created by Agreement PSAA12-9268 of 2012, hear cases from several districts.

=== List of ordinary judicial districts ===
The following table lists the 34 districts of the ordinary jurisdiction and the judicial circuits of each, identified by their seat. The respective Superior Tribunal is seated in the head municipality of each district.

Judicial district	No.	Judicial circuits
Antioquia	33	Abejorral, Amagá, Amalfi, Andes, Apartadó, Bolívar, Caucasia, Cisneros, Concordia, Dabeiba, El Bagre, El Santuario, Fredonia, Frontino, Ituango, Jericó, La Ceja, Marinilla, Puerto Berrío, Rionegro, San Pedro de los Milagros, Santa Bárbara, Santa Fe de Antioquia, Santa Rosa de Osos, Segovia, Sonsón, Sopetrán, Támesis, Titiribí, Turbo, Urrao, Yarumal, Yolombó
Arauca	2	Arauca, Saravena
Archipelago of San Andrés and Providencia	1	San Andrés
Armenia	2	Armenia, Calarcá
Barranquilla	4	Barranquilla, Puerto Colombia, Sabanalarga, Soledad
Bogotá	1	Bogotá
Bucaramanga	4	Barrancabermeja, Bucaramanga, Málaga, San Vicente de Chucurí
Buga	7	Buenaventura, Buga, Cartago, Palmira, Roldanillo, Sevilla, Tuluá
Cali	1	Cali
Cartagena	6	Cartagena, El Carmen de Bolívar, Magangué, Mompós, Simití, Turbaco
Cúcuta	3	Cúcuta, Los Patios, Ocaña
Cundinamarca	16	Cáqueza, Chocontá, Facatativá, Funza, Fusagasugá, Gachetá, Girardot, Guaduas, La Mesa, La Palma, Leticia, Pacho, Soacha, Ubaté, Villeta, Zipaquirá
Florencia	3	Belén de los Andaquíes, Florencia, Puerto Rico
Ibagué	10	Chaparral, Espinal, Fresno, Guamo, Honda, Ibagué, Lérida, Líbano, Melgar, Purificación
Manizales	10	Aguadas, Anserma, Chinchiná, La Dorada, Manizales, Manzanares, Pensilvania, Puerto Boyacá, Riosucio, Salamina
Medellín	6	Bello, Caldas, Envigado, Girardota, Itagüí, Medellín
Mocoa	3	Mocoa, Puerto Asís, Sibundoy
Montería	8	Ayapel, Cereté, Chinú, Lorica, Montelíbano, Montería, Planeta Rica, Sahagún
Neiva	4	Garzón, La Plata, Neiva, Pitalito
Pamplona	1	Pamplona
Pasto	8	Barbacoas, Ipiales, La Cruz, La Unión, Pasto, Samaniego, Tumaco, Túquerres
Pereira	7	Apía, Belén de Umbría, Dosquebradas, La Virginia, Pereira, Quinchía, Santa Rosa de Cabal
Popayán	8	Bolívar, Caloto, Guapi, Patía (El Bordo), Popayán, Puerto Tejada, Santander de Quilichao, Silvia
Quibdó	4	Bahía Solano, Istmina, Quibdó, Riosucio
Riohacha	4	Maicao, Riohacha, San Juan del Cesar, Villanueva
San José del Guaviare	3	Inírida, Mitú, San José del Guaviare
San Gil	6	Charalá, Cimitarra, Puente Nacional, San Gil, Socorro, Vélez
Santa Marta	6	Ciénaga, El Banco, Fundación, Pivijay, Plato, Santa Marta
Santa Rosa de Viterbo	7	Duitama, El Cocuy, Paz de Río, Santa Rosa de Viterbo, Soatá, Socha, Sogamoso
Sincelejo	5	Corozal, Majagual, San Marcos, Sincé, Sincelejo
Tunja	7	Chiquinquirá, Garagoa, Guateque, Miraflores, Moniquirá, Ramiriquí, Tunja
Valledupar	3	Aguachica, Chiriguaná, Valledupar
Villavicencio	6	Acacías, Granada, Puerto Carreño, Puerto López, San Martín, Villavicencio
Yopal	4	Monterrey, Orocué, Paz de Ariporo, Yopal
Total	203	

== Administrative judicial districts ==
The administrative litigation jurisdiction has its own territorial division. Each administrative judicial district has an Administrative Tribunal with jurisdiction in its territory, and is divided into administrative judicial circuits, where the administrative courts operate. Unlike the ordinary districts, these districts generally coincide with departments, and their map is adjusted by agreements of the Superior Council of the Judiciary. For example, Agreement PCSJA20-11653 of 2020 created administrative judicial circuits in Antioquia and Norte de Santander and adjusted the map of the jurisdiction.

=== List of administrative judicial districts ===
There are currently 27 administrative judicial districts. The following table shows them with their circuits, identified by their seat:

Administrative judicial district	No.	Administrative judicial circuits
Antioquia	3	Apartadó, Medellín, Turbo
Arauca	1	Arauca
Archipelago of San Andrés and Providencia	1	San Andrés
Atlántico	1	Barranquilla
Bolívar	2	Cartagena, Magangué
Boyacá	3	Duitama, Sogamoso, Tunja
Caldas	1	Manizales
Caquetá	1	Florencia
Casanare	1	Yopal
Cauca	1	Popayán
Cesar	2	Aguachica, Valledupar
Chocó	1	Quibdó
Córdoba	1	Montería
Cundinamarca	5	Bogotá, Facatativá, Girardot, Leticia, Zipaquirá
Huila	1	Neiva
La Guajira	2	Maicao, Riohacha
Magdalena	1	Santa Marta
Meta	3	Granada, San José del Guaviare, Villavicencio
Nariño	2	Pasto, Tumaco
Norte de Santander	3	Cúcuta, Ocaña, Pamplona
Putumayo	1	Mocoa
Quindío	1	Armenia
Risaralda	1	Pereira
Santander	3	Barrancabermeja, Bucaramanga, San Gil
Sucre	1	Sincelejo
Tolima	1	Ibagué
Valle del Cauca	4	Buenaventura, Buga, Cali, Cartago
Total	53	

== Disciplinary judicial districts ==
The disciplinary jurisdiction has its own territorial organization. Legislative Act 2 of 2015 created the National Commission of Judicial Discipline, which replaced the Disciplinary Jurisdictional Chamber of the Superior Council of the Judiciary, and ordered that the disciplinary chambers of the sectional councils of the judiciary be transformed into sectional commissions of judicial discipline. The disciplinary jurisdictional function is exercised by the National Commission and the sectional commissions, which may be internally divided into chambers or sub-chambers.

The sectional commissions hear, at first instance, disciplinary complaints against lawyers, judges of the Republic, judicial employees and justices of the peace. In Judiciary documents their territory is called a "disciplinary judicial district", such as that of Meta.

=== List of sectional commissions of judicial discipline ===
There are 25 sectional commissions, located in 24 departments and in Bogotá:

Sectional commission	Seat
Antioquia	Medellín
Atlántico	Barranquilla
Bogotá	Bogotá
Bolívar	Cartagena
Boyacá	Tunja
Caldas	Manizales
Caquetá	Florencia
Casanare	Yopal
Cauca	Popayán
Cesar	Valledupar
Chocó	Quibdó
Córdoba	Montería
Cundinamarca	Bogotá
Huila	Neiva
La Guajira	Riohacha
Magdalena	Santa Marta
Meta	Villavicencio
Nariño	Pasto
Norte de Santander	Cúcuta
Quindío	Armenia
Risaralda	Pereira
Santander	Bucaramanga
Sucre	Sincelejo
Tolima	Ibagué
Valle del Cauca	Cali

== Agrarian and rural judicial districts ==
The agrarian and rural jurisdiction was incorporated into the Constitution by Legislative Act 03 of 2023 to resolve disputes over land and agrarian production. Its structure was defined by Statutory Law 2570 of 2026, signed on 27 March 2026, following the Constitutional Court's constitutional review in Judgment C-340 of 2025.

According to the law, the agrarian and rural tribunals are created by the Superior Council of the Judiciary in each agrarian and rural judicial district, with a number of magistrates that may not be fewer than three. The agrarian and rural courts operate in the circuits or municipalities determined by the Council, and the court of last resort of the jurisdiction is the Civil, Agrarian and Rural Cassation Chamber of the Supreme Court of Justice. Agrarian and rural judicial districts, like administrative ones, are divided into circuits.

=== Agrarian and Rural Judicial District of Tunja ===
Before the enactment of the statutory law, the Superior Council of the Judiciary had already created the Agrarian and Rural Judicial District of Tunja, the first in the country, effective 2 May 2024. It is made up of five agrarian and rural circuits: Cartagena, Pasto, Popayán, Quibdó and Tunja. The first four group 38 municipalities, and the Tunja circuit has jurisdiction over the municipalities of the Judicial District of Tunja of the ordinary jurisdiction. To define these municipalities, the Council took into account, among other criteria, ethnic and peasant territorialities, the municipalities of the Development Programs with a Territorial Focus (PDET) and potential conflicts.

The Council also created three magistrate offices of the Agrarian and Rural Tribunal of Tunja and five agrarian and rural circuit courts, one in each seat.

Agrarian and rural circuit	Municipalities
Cartagena	El Carmen de Bolívar, Córdoba, El Guamo, María la Baja, San Jacinto, San Juan Nepomuceno, Zambrano.
Pasto	Cumbitara, El Rosario, Leiva, Los Andes, Policarpa.
Popayán	Argelia, Balboa, Buenos Aires, Cajibío, Caldono, Caloto, Corinto, El Tambo, Jambaló, Mercaderes, Miranda, Morales, Patía, Piendamó.
Quibdó	Acandí, Bojayá, Carmen del Darién, Condoto, El Litoral de San Juan, Istmina, Medio Atrato, Medio San Juan, Nóvita, Riosucio, Sipí, Unguía.
Tunja	Municipalities of the Judicial District of Tunja of the ordinary jurisdiction (Chiquinquirá, Garagoa, Guateque, Miraflores, Moniquirá, Ramiriquí and Tunja are its circuits).

=== Proposed agrarian judicial map ===
The Superior Council of the Judiciary has designed a proposed judicial map to extend the jurisdiction nationwide, which provides for six judicial districts and 42 judicial circuits. According to the Council, this structure does not replicate the country's political-administrative division, but follows a technical methodology based on a prioritization index of agrarian and rural territories, and is subject to adjustment after the approval of the ordinary law regulating the jurisdiction. The statutory law establishes that the creation of offices must prioritize rural areas, PDET territories and regions with high conflict over land tenure.

== See also ==
- Judiciary of Colombia
- National Commission of Judicial Discipline
- Superior Council of the Judiciary
