= Lizarralde =

Lizarralde is a Basque language surname. Notable people with the surname include:

- José Luis Astigarraga Lizarralde (1940–2017), Peruvian bishop
- Iñigo Lizarralde (born 1966), Spanish footballer
- Marian Beitialarrangoitia (born 1968), Spanish politician, full name Maria Angeles Beitialarrangoitia Lizarralde
- Rubén Darío Lizarralde Montoya, Colombian politician
- Txusta (born 1986), Spanish footballer, full name Jon Irazustabarrena Lizarralde
