= Herrán (surname) =

Herrán is a surname. Notable people with the surname include:

- Eduardo Barriobero y Herrán (1875 – 1939), Spanish lawyer and activist
- Joaquín Leguina Herrán (born 1941), Spanish politician and writer
- Jorge Herrán (1897-1969), Uruguayan architect
- Josefina Herrán (1930–2024), First Lady of Uruguay 1972-1976
- María Teresa Herrán (born 1946), Colombian journalist and artist
- Miguel Herrán (born 1996), Spanish actor
- Pedro Alcántara Herrán (1800 – 1872), President of the Republic of New Granada
- Saturnino Herrán (1887 – 1918), Mexican Painter
- Tomás Herrán (1834 – 1904), Colombian diplomat

See also

- Herrán (disambiguation)
