= Enrique Gil Botero =

Colombian politician and lawyer

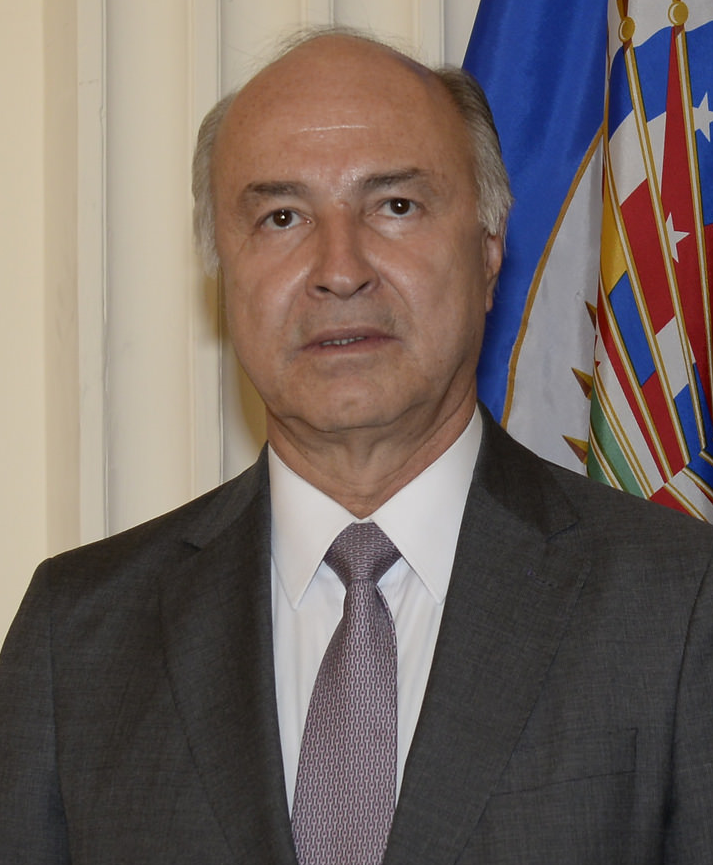

Minister of Justice and Law
- In office 9 March 2017 – 7 August 2018
- President: Juan Manuel Santos
- Preceded by: Jorge Eduardo Londoño
- Succeeded by: Gloria María Borrero

Magistrate of the Council of State of the Republic of Colombia
- In office 2003–2011
- Preceded by: Gustavo Aponte
- Succeeded by: Rafael Ostau de Lafont

Personal details
- Born: 9 December 1953 (age 72) Fredonia, Antioquia, Colombia
- Party: Colombian Conservative Party
- Spouse: Beatriz Ochoa
- Children: Ricardo Gil Ochoa
- Education: University of Antioquia; University of Salamanca
- Profession: Lawyer; Jurist

Enrique de Jesús Gil Botero (Fredonia, Antioquia, December 9, 1953) is a Colombian politician and lawyer, who was a Magistrate of the State Council, rapporteur of the Inter-American Commission on Human Rights, and a specialist in Administrative and Constitutional Law.

Gil Botero served as Counselor of State of Colombia between January 2008 and December 2015, of which he was president between April 2008 and March 2009. From March 9, 2017 to August 7, 2018, he was Minister of Justice and Law of Colombia, replacing Jorge Eduardo Londoño.

== Biography ==
Gil Botero is a lawyer from Antioquia, a member of the Colombian Conservative Party and the seventh Minister of Justice, in the government of President Juan Manuel Santos. He has been Counselor of State, litigant, arbitrator of the Medellin Chamber of Commerce for Antioquia, professor and member of the Inter-American Commission on Human Rights.

=== Presidency of Álvaro Uribe Vélez ===
In 2008 he was elected Judge of the State Council, filling the vacancy of Judge Ricardo Hoyos Duque, also from Antioquia and a conservative. Gil Botero was supported by then Minister of the Interior Carlos Holguin Sardi and President Álvaro Uribe.

He was president of the Council of State between 2008 and 2009. During that last year, his brother Luciano Gil Botero, an electrical engineer, who was chatting with two friends on public roads, was shot by two men on a motorcycle.

=== Presidency of Juan Manuel Santos ===
After completing his period in the Council of State, Gil Botero was a contractor for the Attorney General's Office. Said contracts generated a scandal, according to public opinion, because they corresponded to a consideration for the vote of the then magistrate Gil, for the continuity of Prosecutor Eduardo Montealegre in his position.

On July 16, 2015, Gil Botero was elected Member of the Inter-American Commission on Human Rights for the period 2016 - 2019, at the proposal of Colombian Foreign Minister María Ángela Holguín, before the Organization of American States. During 2016, he served as special rapporteur of the Commission in Mexico.

Also during the year 2016, Gil Botero was on the national front page for the interest of his party, the Colombian Conservative Party, to have him on the list to elect the new Inspector General of the Nation and retain said entity for the party. Thus, his party proposed his name to the president of the republic, along with those of Wilson Ruiz and Jaime Arrubla Paucar, to choose among their three proposed people. President Santos finally decided to have María Mercedes López on the list.

However, his party continued to maintain an interest in having Gil Botero in one of the high positions in the state and that is how, in the first days of 2017, the new president of the Conservative Party, Senator Hernán Andrade, proposed to President Juan Manuel Santos to pre-select Gil to fill one of the four vacancies in the Constitutional Court of Colombia.

Finally, Santos chose to appoint Gil Botero as Minister of Justice of Colombia, replacing Jorge Londoño, on February 24, 2017.

== Studies ==
Enrique Botero Gil is a lawyer graduated from the University of Antioquia, with a specialization in administrative law from the Pontifical Bolivarian University of Medellín and in constitutional law from the University of Salamanca in Spain. Likewise, he is a graduate of the High Government Program (Programa de Alto Gobierno) of the Alberto Lleras Camargo School of Government of the University of los Andes.

== Professional life ==
Gil Botero founded in 1993, together with other legal professionals (among whom are the former magistrate of the Supreme Court of Justice Javier Tamayo Jaramillo, the treatise writer and academic Gilberto Martínez Rave and the also former Councilor of State Ricardo Hoyos Duque), the IARCE (Antioquia Institute of Civil and State Responsibility).

=== Public and private positions in Colombia ===
- Trial lawyer before the Contentious Administrative Jurisdiction (1984-2006).
- Deputy Judge of the Contentious Administrative Court of Antioquia (1988-1998).
- Deputy Judge of the Council of State, third section (1997-2006).
- Arbitrator of the Medellin Chamber of Commerce for Antioquia (1984-2006).
- Counselor of State of Colombia (2008-2015).
- President of the State Council of Colombia (2008-2009).
- Member of the Inter-American Commission on Human Rights (2016-2017).

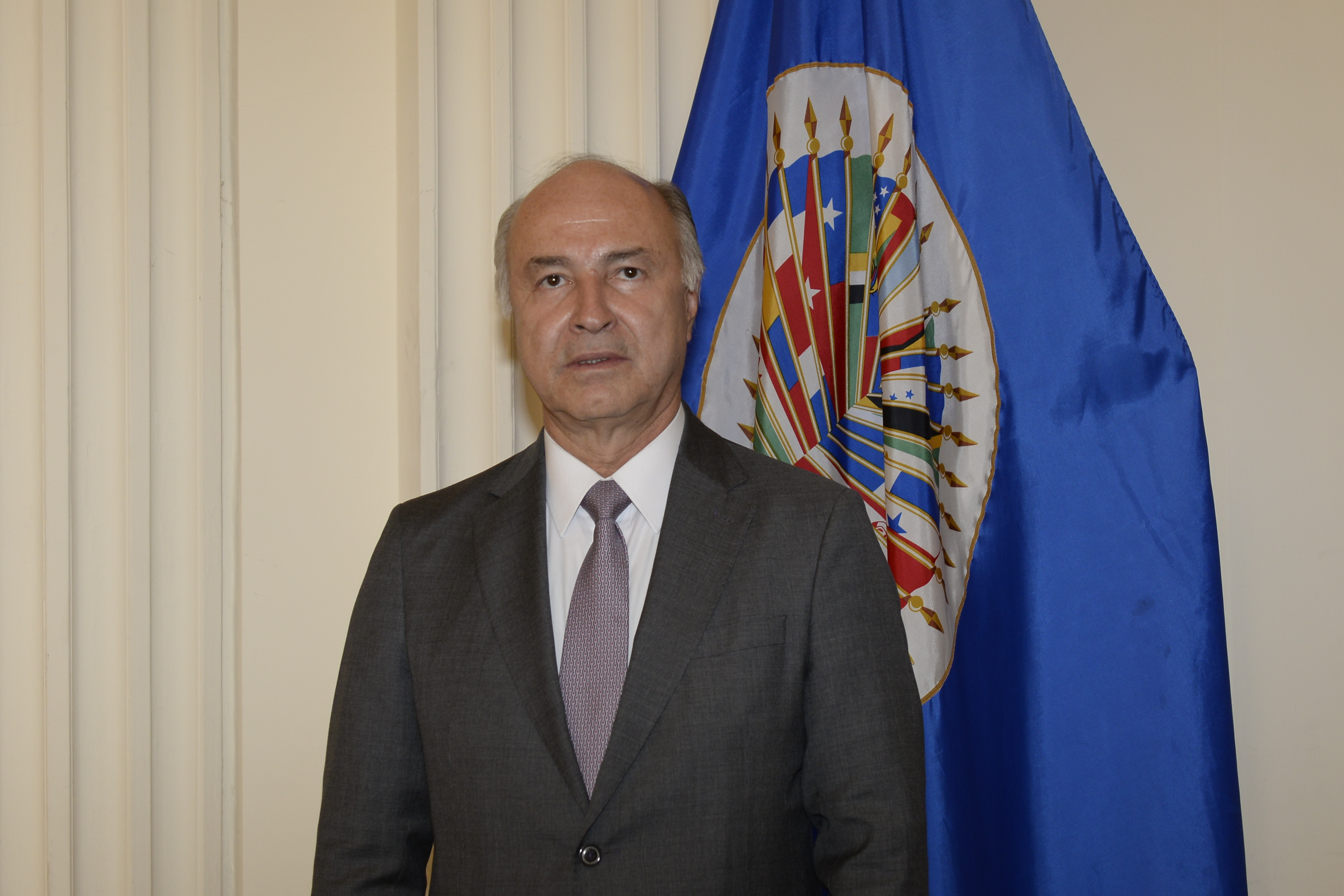
Gil Botero, as member of the Inter-American Commission on Human Rights

=== Professor positions ===
He has also stood out in the academic field, as a professor at the following universities:

- University of Medellin (1981-1992), (1994-2002).
- University of Antioquia (1990-1996).
- Pontifical Bolivarian University (1993-2015).
- University of San Buenaventura (1993-2015).

== State Counselor ==
Gil Botero did a remarkable job in the Council of State; he was elected president of the high court in 2008, with just a few months as a magistrate.

Ideologically, Gil Botero was in the block of magistrates close to President Álvaro Uribe and of conservative positions. He was a rapporteur for numerous processes of administrative reparation by the Colombian state.

The most notable process of all, and which generated great media exposure in the country, was the condemnation of the Colombian state for the crimes of the Los Doce Apóstoles paramilitary group, about which there were accusations of being led by the brother of former president Álvaro Uribe, Santiago Uribe Vélez, who faced a process for his financing. In 2013, Gil Botero pointed out that said paramilitary group was financed by merchants in its area of influence and had the support of the Public Force and the Catholic Church. Similarly, Gil Botero condemned the Colombian state for the El Aro massacre, which occurred in the village of the same name in the municipality of Ituango, Antioquia in 1997, where 15 defenseless peasants lost their lives and others were stripped of their property and displaced from their territory.

During his last months as a magistrate, Gil Botero voted in favor of maintaining the four-year term in office of prosecutor Eduardo Montealegre until 2016 and not applying the institutional term, which would end the term of the prosecutor in 2014. Of a total of 23 votes, 20 were in favor of the position taken by Gil Botero.

== Justice minister ==
On February 24, 2017, he was appointed by President Juan Manuel Santos as Minister of Justice and Law; Santos defined him as a jurist with the best credentials and assigned him the primary task of contributing from Justice, so that the Colombian state continues to consolidate itself as the best ally of the rights of Colombians, starting with a supreme right, the most sublime of all, which is the right to peace.

When he began his term at the head of the Ministry of Justice, his main challenges were: to carry out the Ten-Year Justice Plan and continue promoting the Special Jurisdiction for Peace (JEP), which only needed one more debate to be approved by the Congress when Gil Botero took office and which is a fundamental part of the peace agreement reached with the FARC.

He took office on March 9, 2017 at the Casa de Nariño. At that time, President Juan Manuel Santos announced that the Government would seek an agreement with the High Courts on sensitive issues of justice, at the initiative of the new head of the Ministry of Justice.

== Secretary General of the COMJIB ==
On July 25, 2019, Botero Gil was appointed as Secretary General of the COMJIB (Conference of Ministers of Justice of Ibero-American Countries). This organization's main objective is to strengthen cooperation on Justice issues among the members associated with this organization, through the adoption of legal treaties, as well as resolutions and recommendations for the member countries. Another purpose of the organization is to analyze and discuss possible reforms of the penitentiary systems of the member states.

Political offices
Preceded by Jorge Eduardo Londoño	Minister of Justice and Law of Colombia; 9 March 2017- 7 August 2018	Succeeded by Gloria María Borrero

== See also ==
- Ministry of Justice and Law (Colombia)
- Colombian Conservative Party
- Colombian parapolitics scandal
- El Aro Massacre
