= Herrán =

The name Herrán may refer to:

Geography

- Herrán, Norte de Santander, a Colombian municipality
- Herran, French commune in the Haute-Garonne
- Herran Street, a road in Manila, Philippines
- Herrán, Burgos, a village in Valle de Tobalina, Burgos Province, Spain
- Herrán (Cantabria), a village in Santillana del Mar, Cantabria, Spain

History

- Hay–Herrán Treaty, a 1903 treaty between America and Colombia

See also

- Herrán (surname)
