= Superior Tribunal of Antioquia =

Colombian appellate court

Superior Tribunal of the Judicial District of Antioquia
- Tribunal Superior del Distrito Judicial de Antioquia
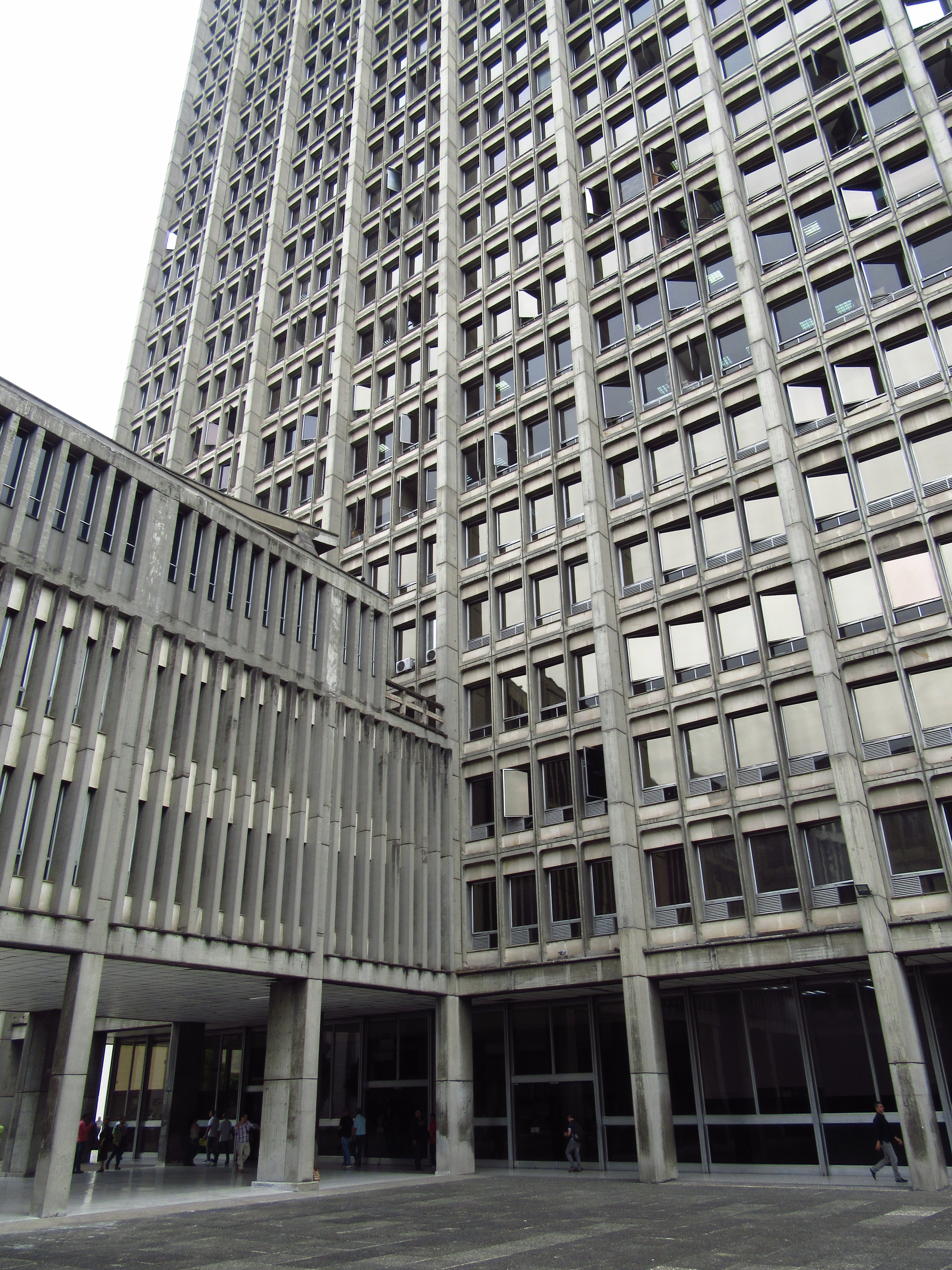
- José Félix de Restrepo Palace of Justice, seat of the tribunal
- Established: 7 September 1990
- Jurisdiction: Judicial District of Antioquia
- Location: José Félix de Restrepo Palace of Justice, Medellín, Antioquia Department, Colombia
- Composition method: Appointment by the Supreme Court of Justice of Colombia from judicial-career lists
- Authorised by: Law 270 of 1996
- Number of positions: 17
- Website: tribunalsuperiorantioquia.com

President
- Currently: William Enrique Santa Marín
- Since: 2026

Vice President
- Currently: Javier Enrique Castillo Cadena
- Since: 2026

The Superior Tribunal of Antioquia, formally the Superior Tribunal of the Judicial District of Antioquia (Spanish: Tribunal Superior del Distrito Judicial de Antioquia), is a Colombian appellate court forming part of the ordinary jurisdiction. It serves as the court of second instance for the Judicial District of Antioquia. Although it is based in Medellín, its territorial jurisdiction covers the municipalities of the Antioquia Department that do not form part of the separate Judicial District of Medellín.

The tribunal is composed of seventeen magistrates divided among four specialized chambers: the Civil and Family Chamber, the Civil Chamber Specialized in Land Restitution, the Labor Chamber and the Criminal Chamber.

== History ==
Until the end of the 1980s, the department of Antioquia constituted a single judicial district. One superior tribunal, located in Medellín, exercised jurisdiction throughout the department.

Population growth and an increase in litigation caused the superior tribunals of Medellín and Bogotá to reach a size that complicated their administration. Law 2 of 1984 therefore ordered their division and provided for the creation of several new judicial districts, including the Judicial District of Antioquia.

Decree 2270 of 1989 implemented the division of Antioquia into two judicial districts. The Judicial District of Medellín retained the judicial circuits of Medellín, Bello, Envigado, Girardota and Itagüí, while the remainder of the department was assigned to the new Judicial District of Antioquia. The decree established the new tribunal's seat in Medellín and initially organized it into six chambers: Criminal, Civil, Labor, Family, Disciplinary and Agrarian.

The tribunal was formally constituted on 7 September 1990. At the time, it comprised nineteen magistrates divided among six chambers. Its founding magistrates included Jorge Aníbal Gómez Gallego, the tribunal’s first president, and Sigifredo Espinosa Pérez, both of whom later served as magistrates of the Supreme Court of Justice of Colombia. Carmenza Correa was the first woman to serve as president of the tribunal.

In 2012, as part of the implementation of Law 1448 of 2011—commonly known as the Victims and Land Restitution Law—the Superior Council of the Judiciary created the tribunal's Civil Chamber Specialized in Land Restitution through Agreement PSAA12-9268 of 24 February 2012.

== Organization ==
The tribunal is currently composed of seventeen magistrates serving in four specialized chambers:

- the Civil and Family Chamber, with five magistrates;
- the Civil Chamber Specialized in Land Restitution, with three magistrates;
- the Labor Chamber, with three magistrates; and
- the Criminal Chamber, with six magistrates.

The magistrates of the tribunal hold judicial-career positions and are appointed by the Plenary Chamber of the Supreme Court of Justice of Colombia from lists prepared under the judicial merit system, in accordance with the Statutory Law on the Administration of Justice.

The tribunal exercises its administrative functions through its Plenary Chamber, consisting of all its magistrates, and through its Governing Chamber. Each specialized chamber also elects a president and vice president.

== Jurisdiction and functions ==
The Judicial District of Antioquia comprises the municipalities of the department that do not belong to the Judicial District of Medellín. These municipalities are organized into more than thirty judicial circuits, covering most of the department's territory.

As a superior tribunal of a judicial district, it primarily hears appeals from decisions issued by circuit courts within its territory. Its specialized chambers also exercise the jurisdiction assigned to them by Colombia's civil, family, labor and criminal procedural legislation.

The Civil Chamber Specialized in Land Restitution hears proceedings concerning the restitution and formalization of land that was dispossessed or abandoned as a result of the Colombian armed conflict, particularly cases in which an opposing party has appeared. It also serves as the functional superior of the specialized civil circuit courts for land restitution within the territorial area assigned to it by the Superior Council of the Judiciary.

== Seat ==
The tribunal is housed in the José Félix de Restrepo Palace of Justice in the administrative district of La Alpujarra, in central Medellín. Its offices and courtrooms are principally located on the building's 26th and 27th floors.

== Presidents ==
Magistrates who have served as president of the tribunal include Jorge Aníbal Gómez Gallego, its first president; Alberto Giraldo; Sigifredo Espinosa Pérez; José Luciano Sanín; Gabriel Moncada; Jaime Nanclares; Aldemar Muñoz; Carmenza Correa; Juan Diego Ocampo; Darío Ignacio Estrada Sanín; María Teresa Holguín; Jorge Mauricio Burgos; Héctor Hernando Álvarez; William Enrique Santa Marín; Juan Pablo Suárez Orozco; Nancy Ávila de Miranda; Nancy Edith Bernal Millán; Javier Enrique Castillo Cadena; and Wilmar José Fuentes Cepeda.

William Enrique Santa Marín was an elected president for 2026, with Javier Enrique Castillo Cadena serving as a vice president.

== See also ==
- Judiciary of Colombia
