= Alma Beatriz Rengifo =

Colombian lawyer and politician

National Registrar of Colombia
- In office August 2002 – 1 January 2007
- President: Álvaro Uribe
- Preceded by: Iván Duque Escobar
- Succeeded by: Juan Carlos Galindo

Minister of Justice and Law of Colombia
- In office 1997–1998
- President: Ernesto Samper
- Preceded by: Carlos Eduardo Medellín Becerra
- Succeeded by: Parmenio Cuéllar Bastidas

Personal details
- Born: Alma Beatriz Rengifo López; 1953 Silva, Colombia
- Died: 10 January 2015 (aged 61–62) Bogotá, Colombia
- Party: Colombian Liberal Party
- Education: Pontifical Xavierian University
- Occupation: Lawyer, politician

Alma Beatriz Rengifo López (1953 – 10 January 2015) was a Colombian lawyer and politician of the Colombian Liberal Party. She served as general secretary of the Ministry of Foreign Trade, Minister of Justice and Law, and National Registrar.

== Biography ==
Alma Beatriz Rengifo was born in Silvia, Cauca in 1953. She earned a law degree from the University of Cauca, and a doctorate in political science at the Xavierian University in 1975.

She was appointed Minister of Justice and Law of Colombia, as well as delegate minister with executive functions in the government of Ernesto Samper. In addition, she served as legal secretary and deputy director of the Administrative Department of the Presidency, ad hoc legal secretary to learn about matters related to the events that occurred in the Palace of Justice siege by the 19th of April Movement, delegate for administrative contracting, and adviser of the Ministry of Development.

In August 2002, Rengifo became National Registrar in the administration of President Álvaro Uribe. Additionally, she served as legal secretary of the presidency and as general secretary of the Communications and Foreign Trade portfolios. She served as executive director of the Scenarios Corporation, and was a postgraduate speaker at the Xavierian University, within the Faculty of Legal Sciences. Her law practice focused on consultancy in administrative law, administrative contracting, and commercial law.

She was general secretary and head of the legal office of Telecóm at Caracol Radio's Primera Cadena Radial Colombiana SA.

Alma Beatriz Rengifo died in Bogotá on 10 January 2015.
