= Ruth Stella Correa Palacio =

Colombian politician (born 1959)

8th Minister of Justice and Law of Colombia
- In office 12 July 2012 – 13 September 2013
- President: Juan Manuel Santos Calderón
- Preceded by: Juan Carlos Esguerra Portocarrero
- Succeeded by: Alfonso Gómez Méndez

Magistrate of the Council of State of Colombia
- In office 8 October 2004 – 12 July 2012

Personal details
- Born: 13 November 1959 (age 66) Pereira, Risaralda, Colombia
- Party: Liberal
- Education: Free University of Colombia (LLB, 1982)
- Profession: Lawyer

Ruth Stella Correa Palacio (born 13 November 1959) served as the 8th Minister of Justice and Law of Colombia.

== Career ==
A Law and Political Sciences graduate of the Free University of Colombia at Pereira in 1982, she pursued postgraduate studies in Labour Law and Industrial Relations in 1990 at the Externado University, with additional training studies in State Administration at the Pontifical Xavierian University in 1996, and in University Teaching at Saint Thomas Aquinas University in 2000.

Right off college, she was appointed First Civil Municipal Judge of Santa Rosa de Cabal on 1 September 1983. From then on she rose through the judiciary being appointed First Labour Judge for the Pereira Circuit 1985, then Secretary of the Third Division of the Council of State in 1991, Auxiliary Magistrate of the Third Division of the Council of State in 1998, and finally Magistrate of the Council of State in the Third Division. As a prosecutor she worked for the Office of the Inspector General assigned to the Third Division of the Council of State from 1998 to 2001, and in private practice from 2001 to 2004.

=== Minister of Justice ===
On 6 July 2012 President Juan Manuel Santos Calderón announced the appointment of Correa as Minister of Justice and Law. Correa was sworn in on 12 July 2012 by President Santos in a ceremony at the Palace of Nariño. Correa replaced Juan Carlos Esguerra Portocarrero who had submitted his resignation after the failed attempt to reform the Judicial Branch. With her appointment, President Santos fulfilled the Law of Quotas that called for at least a 30% of ministerial positions to go to women, and which had gone unfulfilled since Minister Beatriz Elena Uribe Botero was replaced as Minister of Housing, City and Territory by Germán Vargas Lleras, and two further posts had been filled by men.
