= María Teresa Herrán =

Colombian journalist (born 1946)

- Born: 29 June 1946 (age 80); Bogotá, Colombia
- Education: Paris II; Pontificia Universidad Javeriana (PhD)
- Occupations: Journalist and artist
- Spouse: Juan Camilo Restrepo Salazar
- Children: 3

María Teresa Herrán (born 1946) is a Colombian journalist and artist. A trained lawyer, political scientist and professor, she practiced journalism for 50 years and was a columnist for the newspapers El Espectador and El Tiempo. She has studied the role of the media in society extensively.

== Biography ==
Herrán holds a Master's degree from the DES Diplôme d'Etudes Supérieures (Paris II/1976) and earned her doctorate in Legal Sciences from Colombia's Pontificia Universidad Javeriana in 1969. She is a lawyer who pursued a career in journalism. She also directed the TV news program Promec and was editor-in-chief of the magazine Nueva Frontera.

Beginning when she was a law student, she wrote articles for the newspaper El Nuevo Siglo. She began writing for the women's section of the newspaper El Espectador, conducting interviews and reports, and crafted editorials from the age of 20. She remained a columnist for El Espectador until 2010, using the column to criticize the media. She also hosted a television program called Espacio Público.

As a university professor, she directed the Social Communication-Journalism program at Universidad Central in Colombia. She also directed the Master's program in Communication at Pontificia Universidad Javeriana and has also directed postgraduate programs in Communication Law, Constitutional Law and the Master's program in Communication at the Faculties of Law and Communication.

She has been invited to be a guest speaker at seminars and lectures both within and outside the country and wrote the chapter on Journalism in Colombia since 1998 for the 'New History of Colombia.'

== Artwork ==
Herrán has exhibited 17 works at the Galería Cero in Bogotá, under the curatorship of photographer Jairo A. Llano. The painting exhibit features three series of tree trunks named Grays, Identity and Predation. According to Herrán, “Grays” is the most abstract series. "Identity" is about the country of Colombia. “Predation” is the story of the violation of nature, but also, of its rebirth. Her medium is paint on wooden logs and has said, "Tree trunks have a soul when you look at them in a certain way."

== Private life ==
Herrán is married to Juan Camilo Restrepo Salazar, former Colombian minister and diplomat. They are the parents of three children: Ana María, Camilo and Alberto.

== Selected publications ==
- Herrán, María Teresa. "The school and the mass media." Education and the City, 4 (1997): 44-53.
- Herran, Maria Teresa. Palimpsests and journeys of communication in education. No. 3. National Pedagogical University, 1999.
- Restrepo, Javier Darío, María Teresa Herrán, Jesús Martín-Barbero, and Germán Rey. "War and the media." Journal of Social Studies 16 (2003): 117-119.
- Herrán, María Teresa. Ethics for Journalists. Editorial Norma, 2005.
- Jagua, Carlos Arturo Velandia, and María Teresa Herrán. Costs and effects of war in Colombia. Permanent Assembly of Civil Society for Peace, 2011.
