= Alfonso Gómez Méndez =

Colombian politician (born 1949)

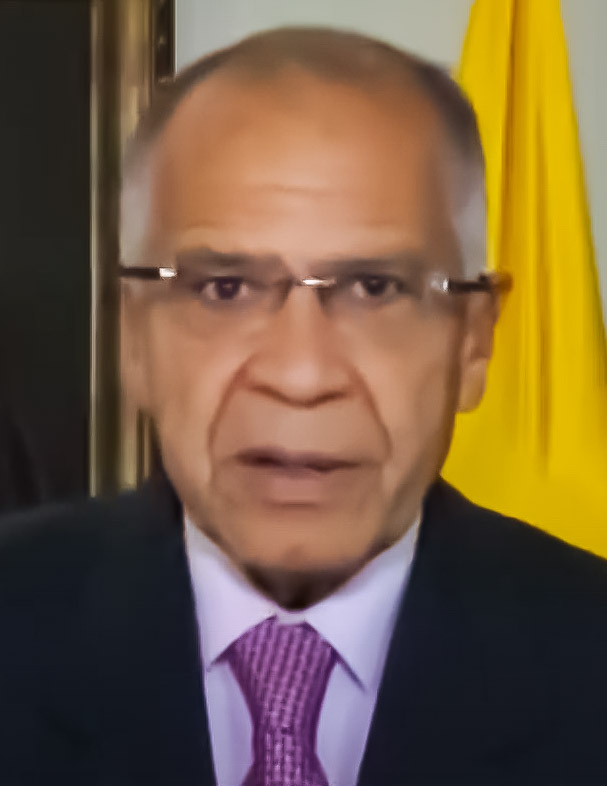
- Gómez campaigning in 2009.

Minister of Justice and Law
- In office 13 September 2013 – 11 August 2014
- President: Juan Manuel Santos
- Preceded by: Ruth Stella Correa Palacio
- Succeeded by: Yesid Reyes

3rd Attorney General of Colombia
- In office 3 July 1997 – 3 July 2001
- Nominated by: Ernesto Samper
- Preceded by: Alfonso Valdivieso
- Succeeded by: Luis Camilo Osorio

Colombia Ambassador to Austria
- In office 1991–1993
- President: César Gaviria Trujillo
- Preceded by: Mario Laserna Pinzón
- Succeeded by: Carlos Lemos Simmonds

Inspector General of Colombia
- In office 9 March 1989 – 23 November 1990
- Nominated by: Virgilio Barco Vargas
- Preceded by: Horacio Serpa Uribe
- Succeeded by: Carlos Gustavo Arrieta Padilla

Member of the Colombian Chamber of Representatives from Tolima
- In office 20 July 1986 – 9 March 1989

Personal details
- Born: 16 August 1949 (age 77) Chaparral, Tolima, Colombia
- Party: Liberal
- Spouse: Patricia Lara Salive (1989—present)
- Children: Alfonso Gómez Lugo; Rosa Gómez Lugo; María Gómez Lara; Federico Gómez Lara
- Education: Universidad Externado de Colombia (LLB, 1971); Panthéon-Assas University (DEA, 1976)
- Profession: Lawyer

Alfonso Gómez Méndez (born 19 August 1949) served as the 9th Minister of Justice and Law of Colombia.

Gómez was born on 19 August 1949 in Chaparral, Tolima. He attended Universidad Externado de Colombia where he graduated in Law in 1971.

On 9 March 1989, the Senate of Colombia elected Gómez to succeed Horacio Serpa Uribe as Inspector General of Colombia. Gómez, who at the time was serving as Chamber Representative, was nominated by President Virgilio Barco Vargas. On 23 November 1990 Gómez resigned citing political pressure; the Deputy Inspector, the Assistant Inspector, the Secretary General, and 23 Delegate Inspectors, all presented their resignation in solidarity with the Inspector General. The backlash from the Senate and others in military and right-wing political circles against Gómez and his department, stemmed from the ruling of the Office of the Inspector General against Army General Jesús Armando Arias Cabrales and Army Colonel Edilberto Sánchez Rubiano for their role during the 1985 Palace of Justice siege.

In January 1991, following his resignation as Inspector General, President César Gaviria Trujillo appointed Gómez Ambassador of Colombia to Austria. While in Vienna, Gómez also served as Permanent Representative of Colombia to the United Nations Office at Geneva.

In 1996 Gómez was elected to the International Narcotics Control Board for a five-year term. Shortly after, on 29 May 1997 the Supreme Court of Justice of Colombia elected Gómez to serve as the 3rd Attorney General of Colombia to succeed Alfonso Valdivieso Sarmiento. Gómez was elected out of a ternary slate presented by President Ernesto Samper Pizano that also included the names of Saturia Esguerra Portocarrero and Manuel Santiago Urueta Ayola. In 1998, Board President Hamid Ghodse asked Gómez to step down citing concerns of a possible conflict of interest; Gómez refused this request, but ultimately resigned citing his "extremely tight work schedule".

== Selected works ==
- Gómez Méndez, Alfonso (1998). Delitos Contra la Vida Y la Integridad Personal (in Spanish). Bogotá: Universidad Externado de Colombia. ISBN 9789586163361. OCLC 41871531.
