= Jorge Eduardo Londoño =

Colombian politician

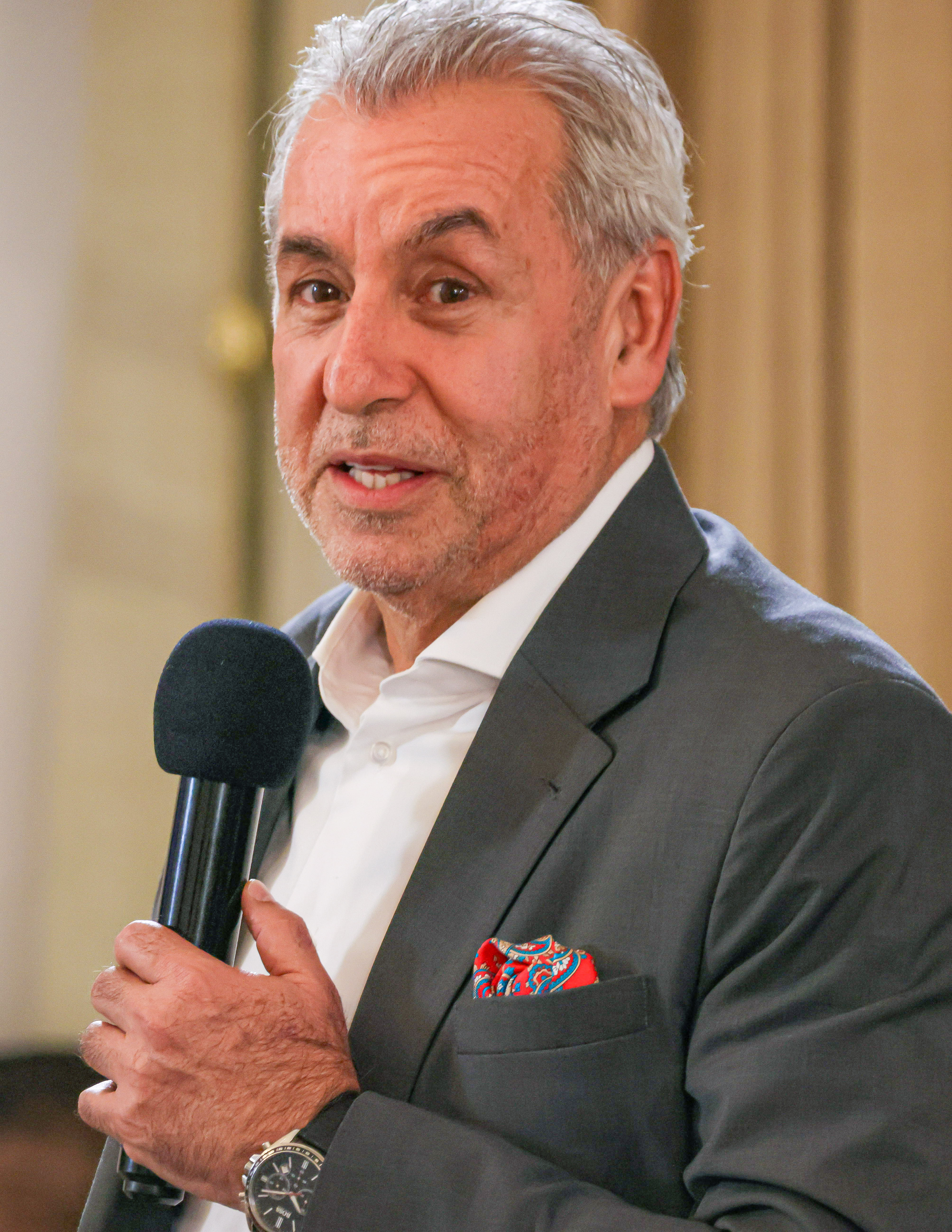

11th Minister of Justice and Law of Colombia
- In office 25 April 2016 – 1 March 2017
- President: Juan Manuel Santos
- Preceded by: Yesid Reyes
- Succeeded by: Enrique Gil Botero

Senator of Colombia
- In office 20 July 2010 – 20 July 2014

Governor Boyacá
- In office 1 January 2004 – 31 December 2007

Personal details
- Born: 25 November 1960 (age 65) Puerto Boyacá, Boyacá
- Party: Green Alliance
- Spouse: Gladys Constanza Medina Brando
- Education: Universidad Externado de Colombia

Jorge Eduardo Londoño (born November 25, 1960) is a Colombian politician, who served as the Minister of Justice and Law. Londoño also previously served as the governor of Boyaca and in 2010 was elected Senator with 62,848 votes as a member of the Green Alliance.
