= Juan Carlos Esguerra =

Colombian lawyer and politician

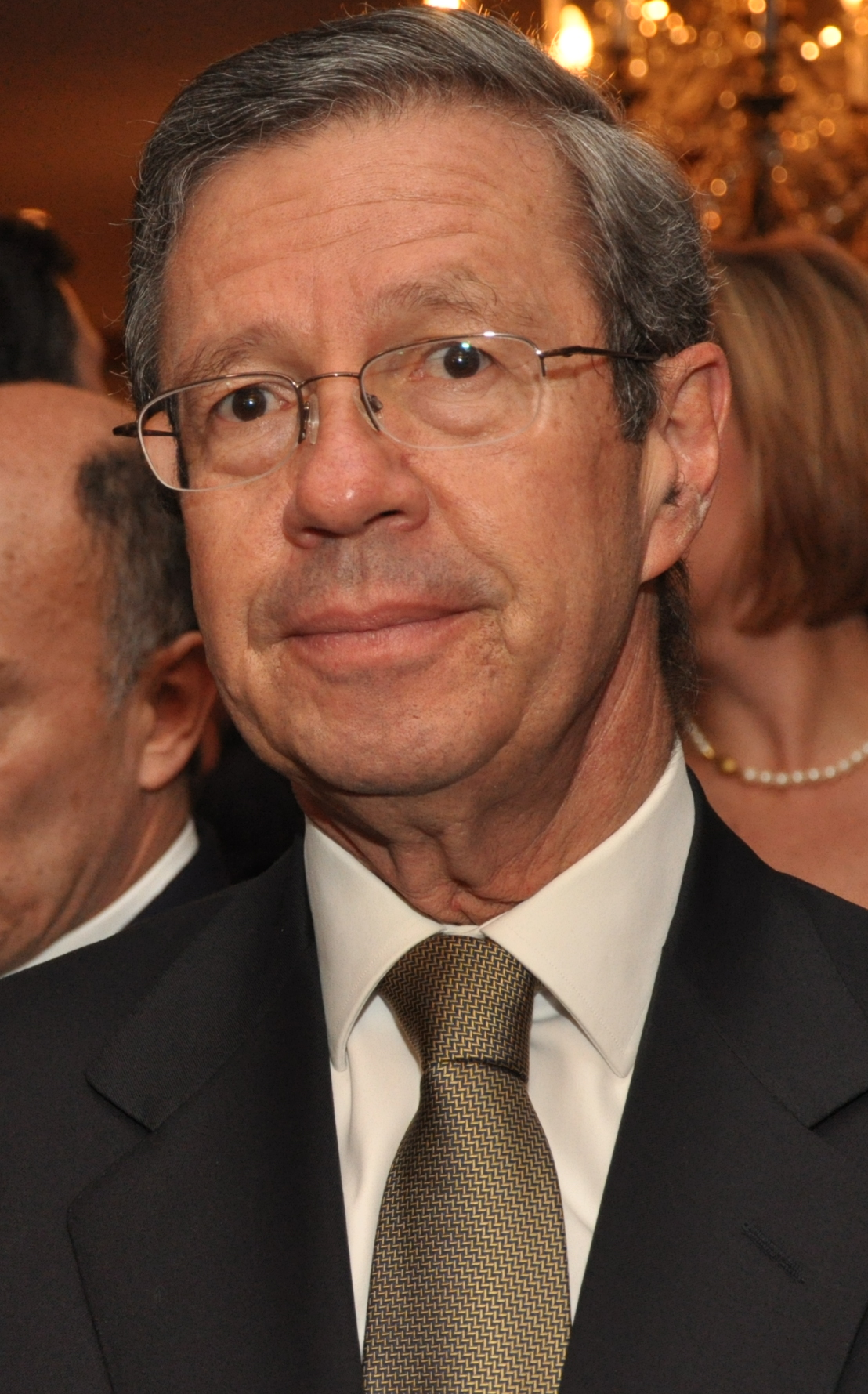

Minister of Justice and Law
- In office August 11, 2011 – July 12, 2012
- President: Juan Manuel Santos
- Preceded by: Rómulo González Trujillo
- Succeeded by: Ruth Stella Correa

28th Colombia Ambassador to the United States
- In office February 11, 1997 – October 27, 1998
- President: Ernesto Samper
- Preceded by: Carlos Lleras de la Fuente
- Succeeded by: Luis Alberto Moreno

Minister of National Defence
- In office August 7, 1995 – February 4, 1997
- President: Ernesto Samper
- Preceded by: Fernando Botero Zea
- Succeeded by: Guillermo Alberto González

Personal details
- Born: 13 March 1949 (age 77) Bogotá, D.C., Colombia
- Party: Liberal
- Other political affiliations: National Salvation Movement (1991)
- Spouse: Julia Miranda Londoño (1982-present)
- Children: Juan Carlos Esguerra Miranda; Cristina Esguerra Miranda; Nicolás Esguerra Miranda
- Education: Pontifical Xavierian University (LLB, 1972); Cornell Law School (LLM, 1973)
- Profession: Lawyer

Juan Carlos Esguerra Portocarrero (born March 13, 1949) is a Colombian lawyer and politician. He has previously served in the Colombian Government as the 7th Minister of Justice and Law, the 28th Ambassador of Colombia to the United States, and as Minister of National Defence.

== Career ==
On August 11, 2011, President Juan Manuel Santos Calderón appointed Esguerra Minister of Justice and Law of Colombia.

== Personal life ==
Born to José María Esguerra Samper and Ana Portocarrero Mutis on March 13, 1949, in Bogotá, D.C., Colombia, he married Julia Miranda Londoño, on December 10, 1982 whom he met while she was a law student and he her law professor at the Pontifical Xavierian University. Together they have three children: Juan Carlos, Cristina, and Nicolás. His wife is the current Director of the National Natural Parks System of Colombia.
