= Gloria María Borrero =

Colombian politician

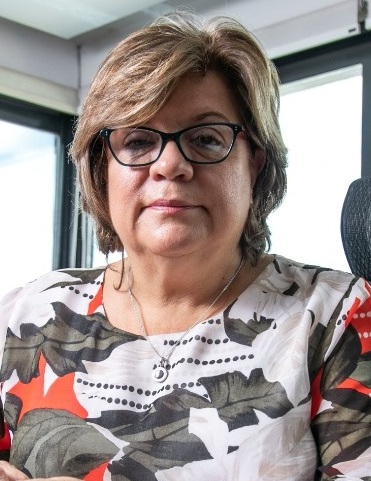
Borrero as a Minister.

Gloria María Borrero (born 1956) is a Colombian politician who served as Minister of Justice from 2018 to 2019.
