= Juan Camilo Restrepo Salazar =

Colombian politician and diplomat

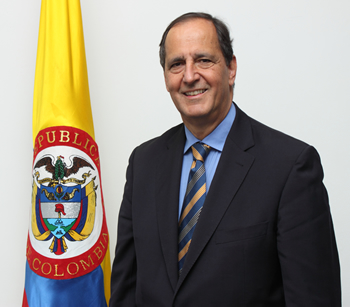
- Official portrait, 2010

Minister of Agriculture and Rural Development
- In office 7 August 2010 – 2 June 2013
- President: Juan Manuel Santos Calderón
- Preceded by: Andrés Fernández Acosta
- Succeeded by: Francisco Estupiñán Heredia

Colombia Ambassador to France
- In office 11 December 2000 – 17 November 2001
- President: Andrés Pastrana Arango
- Preceded by: Adolfo Carvajal Quelquejeu
- Succeeded by: Marta Lucía Ramírez Blanco

Minister of Finance and Public Credit
- In office 7 August 1998 – 7 August 2000
- President: Andrés Pastrana Arango
- Preceded by: Antonio José Urdinola Uribe
- Succeeded by: Juan Manuel Santos Calderón

Senator of Colombia
- In office 20 July 1994 – 20 July 1998

Minister of Mines and Energy
- In office 13 November 1991 – 5 July 1992
- President: César Gaviria Trujillo
- Preceded by: Luis Fernando Vergara Munárriz
- Succeeded by: Guido Alberto Nule Amín

Personal details
- Born: 19 October 1946 (age 79) Medellín, Antioquia, Colombia
- Party: Conservative
- Spouse: María Teresa Herrán
- Children: 3
- Education: Pontifical Xavierian University; University of Paris (Ph.D.)
- Profession: Lawyer
- Website: www.juancamilo.com.co

Juan Camilo Restrepo Salazar (born 19 October 1946) is a Colombian politician who was the 10th Minister of Agriculture and Rural Development of Colombia, serving in the administration of President Juan Manuel Santos Calderón. A veteran politician, he also served as the 63rd Minister of Finance and Public Credit of Colombia, the 17th Minister of Mines and Energy of Colombia, the 20th Ambassador of Colombia to France, and as Senator of Colombia. A lifelong member of the Conservative Party, he tried to run for the Conservative presidential nomination in 1998, losing in the primaries, and 2002, where he won the primaries but withdrew before the election.
