= National Civil Registry (Colombia) =

National Registry of the Civil Status
- Registraduría Nacional del Estado Civil
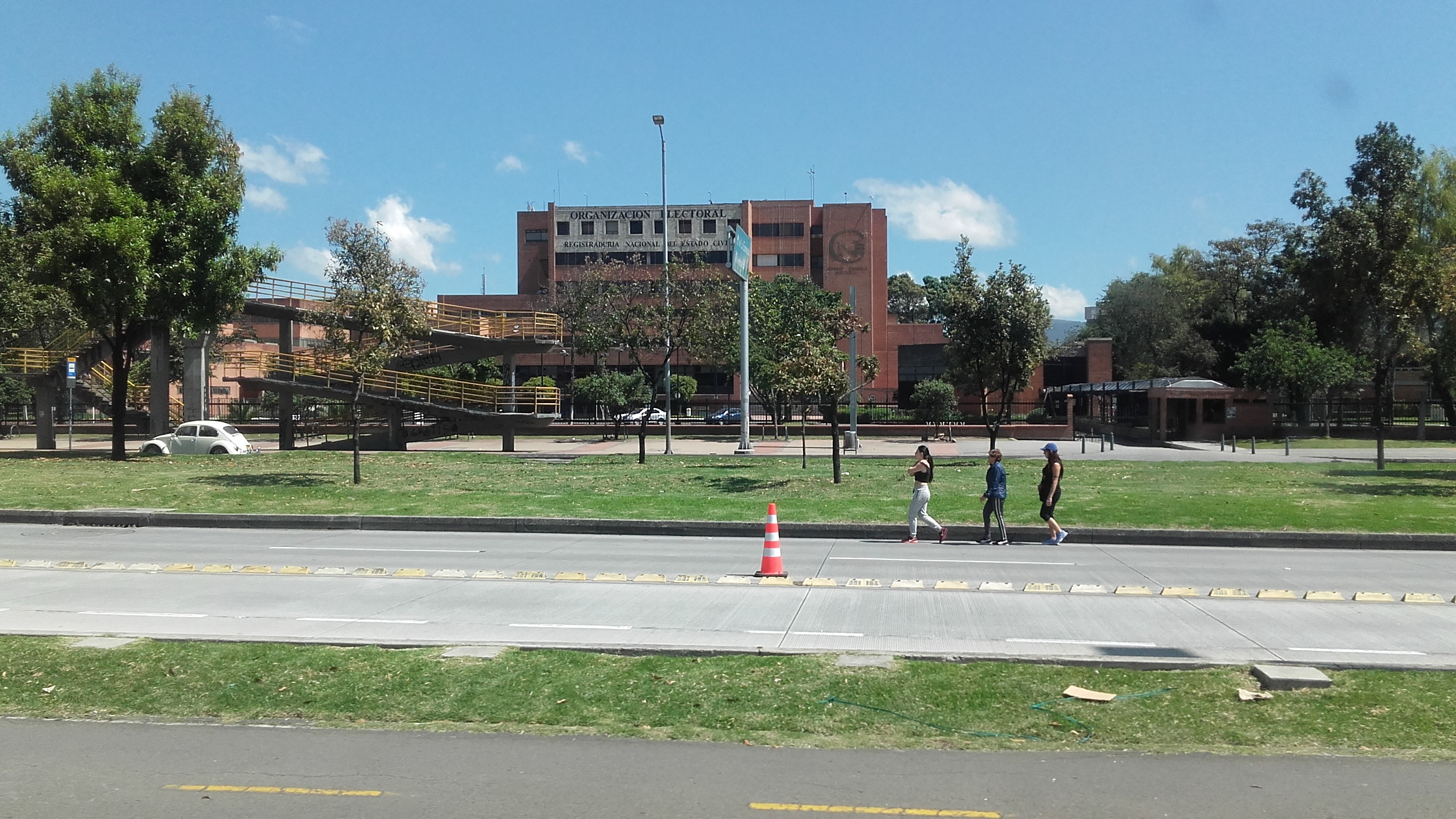

Agency overview
- Headquarters: Avenida Calle 26 # 51-50 CAN; Bogotá, Colombia
- Annual budget: COP$1,160,635,000,000 (2021)
- Agency executive: Alexander Vega Rocha, National Civil Registrar
- Website: www.registraduria.gov.co

The National Registry of the Civil Status (Spanish: Registraduría Nacional del Estado Civil) is the government agency of Colombia charged with collecting and storing the vital statistics and identifying information of all citizens, counts votes of campaigns for the Senate, presidency and the vice presidency, and to regulate the distribution and organization of identity documentation for each citizen for legal purposes.

Colombian citizens obtain their ID (cedula), to be able to vote, and also do all the permits tramits. Their headquarters are located in Bogotá. The current manager of the office is Alexander Vega Rocha. The current legislation made it mandatory for all citizens to carry this document and be able to present the cedula upon request by the authorities. Lack of the cedula allows the local authorities to detain the citizen while the identity is verified in the government data base. This differs with the American legislation. The cedula is a required document for entering and departing the country regardless of the place of residence or second nationality of a Colombian citizen. This requirement is only waved to Colombians that have renounced to the Colombian citizenship, after a lengthy process. The Colombian government made significant changes to the cedula and is requiring all citizens to change to the new national ID in preparation for the presidential elections early 2010.
