= Francisco Estupiñán Heredia =

Colombian banker and politician

11th Minister of Agriculture and Rural Development of Colombia
- In office June 2, 2013 – September 13, 2013
- President: Juan Manuel Santos Calderón
- Preceded by: Juan Camilo Restrepo Salazar
- Succeeded by: Rubén Darío Lizarralde Montoya

Personal details
- Born: 1964 Guateque, Boyacá, Colombia
- Party: Conservative
- Children: Nicolás Estupiñan Alvarado
- Education: Externado University (BBA, 1975)
- Profession: Business Administrator

Francisco de Paula Estupiñán Heredia (born in Guateque - Boyacá) is a business administrator, Colombian economist, and member of the Conservative Party. He served as Minister of Agriculture between June and September 2013. In July 2014, he was appointed as liquidator of La Polar in Colombia by the Superintendence of Companies. During November 2014 until June 2016, he served as president of the Mercantile Exchange of Colombia (BMC).

He has a degree in Business Administration from the Externado University and a specialization in Economics from the Universidad de los Andes .

Estupiñán Heredia has a long career in public and private life. He has served as general director of National Budget, director of the Institute of Industrial Development IFI-Concession Salinas, Deputy Minister of Finance between December 1999 and July 2000, and President of Banco Granahorrar from 2000 to 2003 among other charges. Before being appointed Minister of Agriculture, he served as president of the Banco Agrario.

On 27 May 2013, President Juan Manuel Santos Calderón, announced the designation of Estupiñán as new Minister of Agriculture and Rural Development in replacement of Juan Camilo Restrepo Salazar. He was sworn in on 2 June 2013. In this position Estupiñan had to face the National Agrarian Stoppage in which peasant sectors of the country ceased activities in protest against the conditions generating the crisis of the national agricultural production. Two weeks after the start of the strike, Estupiñan presented his resignation letter, which was accepted by President Santos. Estupiñan left office on September 11, 2013 and Rubén Darío Lizarralde took office in his replacement.

In July 2014, the Superintendence of Companies appointed him liquidator of La Polar. From November 2014 to June 2016 he served as president of the Mercantile Exchange of Colombia (BCM). According to the Financial Superintendency, Estupiñan at the time of taking office in the BCM obviated its connection as liquidator of the chain of stores, for which it announced in September 2015 that it would review the corresponding actions. On December 14, 2015, the Superintendency of Companies declared that "the object of the judicial liquidation process was fulfilled given that the asset was carried out in an orderly and professional manner".
