= Rubén Darío Lizarralde Montoya =

Colombian politician

Rubén Darío Lizarralde

Minister of Agriculture and Rural Development
- Incumbent
- Assumed office 11 September 2013
- President: Juan Manuel Santos
- Preceded by: Francisco Estupiñan

Personal details
- Born: Buga, Cauca Valley, Colombia
- Party: Conservative
- Spouse: María Fernanda Campo (divorced)
- Children: Santiago Lizarralde Campo
- Education: Pontifical Xavierian University (LLB, 1977); University of Miami School of Business (MSPM, 1999)
- Profession: Lawyer

Rubén Darío Lizarralde Montoya is the 12th Minister of Agriculture and Rural Development of Colombia, serving in the administration of President Juan Manuel Santos. Prior to his appointment, Lizarralde, a lawyer from the Pontifical Xavierian University with a Master of Science in Project Management from the University of Miami Business School, was General Manager of Indupalma, a Colombian palm oil-producing company, and member of the Board of Directors of the Colombian Corporation for Agricultural Research (Corpoica).

== Minister of Agriculture ==
On 5 September 2013, as part of a planned cabinet reshuffle, President Santos announced the appointment of Lizarralde as the new Minister of Agriculture and Rural Development. Lizarralde was sworn in on 11 September succeeding Francisco Estupiñán Heredia in the post.
