= Judiciary of Colombia =

National court system

- Rama Judicial de Colombia

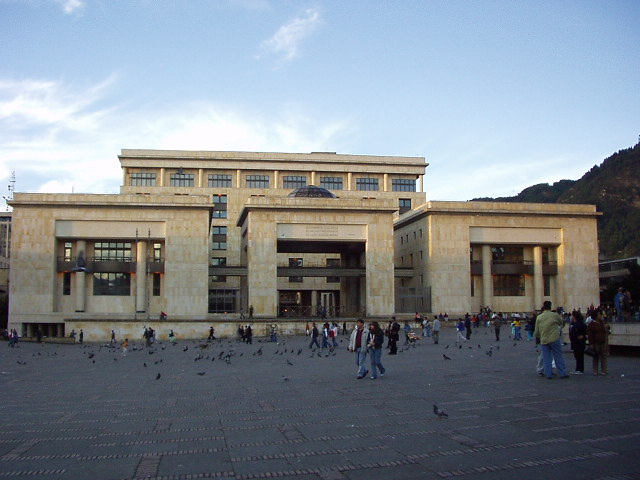
- Palace of Justice, which houses the High Courts of the Colombian judicial branch

Judiciary overview
- Jurisdiction: Colombia
- Headquarters: Bogotá, Colombia
- Judiciary executive: Gerson Chaverra Castro, President

The Judiciary of the Republic of Colombia (Spanish: Rama Judicial de la República de Colombia) is formally the set of institutions or courts of last resort of the three main jurisdictions, together with the Superior Council of the Judiciary, formally and popularly known as the High Courts. The judicial crisis is currently the greatest problem of the Colombian judiciary, owing to an impunity rate of 92%. Added to this is the low quality of convictions: an estimated 1.6 million cases were stalled in the country's courts in 2017, in addition to the corruption in the system, which has led to an unfavorable public image of 80% for the judiciary.

== High Courts ==
The courts of last resort of the three main jurisdictions of the judicial system (ordinary, constitutional and administrative litigation) are called the "High Courts". By constitutional mandate, they exercise their functions in harmony and in accordance with specific guidelines defined by the Charter. The High Courts are seated in the Palace of Justice, on the Plaza de Bolívar in Bogotá.

=== Constitutional Court ===
The Constitutional Court safeguards the integrity and supremacy of the Constitution in the strict and precise terms of articles 241 to 244 of the Political Constitution. The Council of State hears actions for annulment on grounds of unconstitutionality against decrees issued by the National Government whose jurisdiction does not belong to the Constitutional Court. The Constitutional Court is composed of nine magistrates, elected by the Senate of the Republic for individual terms of eight years, from shortlists of three candidates each submitted by the President of the Republic, the Supreme Court of Justice and the Council of State.

- Decide on unconstitutionality lawsuits brought by citizens against acts amending the Constitution, whatever their origin, solely for procedural defects in their formation.
- Decide, prior to the popular vote, on the constitutionality of the call for a referendum or a Constituent Assembly to reform the Constitution, solely for procedural defects in its formation.
- Decide on the constitutionality of referendums on laws and of national popular consultations and plebiscites. The latter solely for procedural defects in their convocation and conduct.
- Decide on unconstitutionality lawsuits brought by citizens against laws, both for their material content and for procedural defects in their formation.
- Decide on unconstitutionality lawsuits brought by citizens against decrees with the force of law issued by the Government, for their material content or for procedural defects in their formation.
- Decide definitively on the constitutionality of the legislative decrees issued by the Government.
- Decide definitively on the constitutionality of bills that have been objected to by the Government as unconstitutional, and of draft statutory laws, both for their material content and for procedural defects in their formation.
- Review, in the manner determined by law, judicial decisions relating to the acción de tutela for constitutional rights.
- Decide definitively on the enforceability of international treaties and of the laws approving them. To that end, the Government shall send them to the Court within six days following the enactment of the law.
- Resolve conflicts of jurisdiction that arise between the different jurisdictions.

=== Council of State ===
The Council of State is the highest court of the Administrative Litigation Jurisdiction and is composed of 31 magistrates, elected by the Council itself for the individual terms determined by the Political Constitution. The Council of State exercises its functions through three chambers, composed as follows: the Full Chamber, by all its members; the Administrative Litigation Chamber, by 27 councilors; and the Consultation and Civil Service Chamber, by the remaining four councilors.

The powers of the Council of State are:

- To perform the functions of supreme court of administrative litigation, in accordance with the rules set by law.
- To hear actions for annulment on grounds of unconstitutionality against decrees issued by the National Government whose jurisdiction does not belong to the Constitutional Court.
- To act as the supreme advisory body of the Government in administrative matters, and it must necessarily be heard in all cases determined by the Constitution and the laws. In cases of transit of foreign troops through the national territory, or of the stationing or transit of foreign warships or aircraft in the waters, territory or airspace of the nation, the government must first hear the Council of State.
- To prepare and submit draft acts amending the Constitution and draft laws.
- To hear cases of loss of investiture of members of Congress, in accordance with the Constitution and the law.
- To draw up its own rules of procedure and perform the other functions determined by law.
- To hear the action for electoral annulment, subject to the rules of jurisdiction established by law.

An important characteristic is that it is the court of last resort of the Administrative Litigation Jurisdiction; this high court resolves disputes between private individuals and the administration, between the administration and the administration itself, and between the administration and private individuals. The court is structurally organized into a Full Chamber, a Consultation and Civil Service Chamber and an Administrative Litigation Chamber, which in turn is composed of five subsections.

=== Supreme Court of Justice ===
The Supreme Court of Justice is the highest court of the Ordinary Jurisdiction and is composed of the odd number of magistrates determined by law. The law divides the Court into Chambers and Special Chambers, assigns to each of them the matters it must hear separately and determines those in which the Court must sit as a full body.

The powers of the Supreme Court of Justice are:

- To act as a court of cassation.
- To hear the right of challenge and the appeal in criminal matters, as determined by law.
- To try the President of the Republic, or whoever acts in his or her stead, and the high officials referred to in article 174, following the procedure established in the Political Constitution, for any punishable conduct attributed to them. For these trials, the Criminal Chamber of the Supreme Court of Justice shall also be made up of Special Chambers that guarantee the right of challenge and the double instance.
- To investigate and try the members of Congress.
- To try, through the Special Chamber of First Instance of the Criminal Chamber of the Supreme Court of Justice, upon accusation by the Attorney General, the Deputy Attorney General, or their delegates of the Unit of Prosecutors before the Supreme Court of Justice, the Vice President of the Republic, the ministers of the Cabinet, the Inspector General, the Ombudsman, the agents of the Public Ministry before the Court, before the Council of State and before the Tribunals, the directors of Administrative Departments, the Comptroller General of the Republic, ambassadors and heads of diplomatic or consular missions, governors, magistrates of Tribunals, and generals and admirals of the Armed Forces, for the punishable acts attributed to them.
- To hear all contentious matters of diplomatic agents accredited to the nation's government, in the cases provided for by international law.

=== National Commission of Judicial Discipline ===
This is the institution that exercises the disciplinary jurisdictional function over the officials and employees of the Judiciary. It is composed of seven magistrates.

There may be Sectional Commissions of Judicial Discipline.

=== Superior Council of the Judiciary ===
The Superior Council of the Judiciary is the governing and administrative body of the Judiciary of Colombia. It is in charge of the government and administration of the Judiciary in areas such as planning, programming and execution of the budget, human talent management through the judicial career, and the preparation of lists of candidates for the posts of magistrate of the other High Courts.

== Jurisdictions ==
=== Ordinary ===
Resolves person-to-person disputes.

- Supreme Court of Justice
- Superior Tribunals of Judicial District
- Circuit Courts
- Municipal Courts, which may be, according to their category, Municipal Promiscuous Courts, Municipal Civil Courts, Small Claims Courts and Multiple Competence Courts.

=== Administrative litigation ===
Resolves person-to-state disputes.

- Council of State
- Administrative Litigation Tribunals
- Administrative Courts

=== Constitutional ===
Responsible for protecting the Political Constitution.

- Constitutional Court
- All judges of the Republic in matters of the acción de tutela.

=== Agrarian and rural ===
Resolves agrarian and rural disputes in the country in an exclusive and specialized manner.

- Civil, Agrarian and Rural Chamber, located in the city of Tunja.
- Agrarian and Rural Tribunals (Agrarian and Rural Judicial District)
- Agrarian and Rural Circuit Courts

== Superior tribunals and administrative tribunals ==
The Administrative Tribunals are created by the Administrative Chamber of the Superior Council of the Judiciary to perform the functions determined by procedural law in each administrative judicial district. They have the number of magistrates determined by the Administrative Chamber of the Superior Council of the Judiciary, which in any case shall not be fewer than three. The Administrative Tribunals exercise their functions through the Full Chamber, made up of all the magistrates; the Governing Chamber; the specialized chambers; and the other plural, odd-numbered decision chambers, in accordance with the law.

There are Sectional Councils of the Judiciary in the seats of those judicial districts where the Administrative Chamber of the Superior Council considers it necessary. The latter may group several judicial districts under the jurisdiction of one Sectional Council. The Administrative Chamber of the Superior Council shall set the number of its members. The Sectional Councils are also divided into an Administrative Chamber and a Disciplinary Jurisdictional Chamber.

== Courts ==
The basic unit of the judicial organization is the court, whatever its category and specialty, and it is composed of the presiding judge, the clerk, the assistants required by the specialty and the qualified auxiliary staff determined by the Superior Council of the Judiciary.

== Judicial career ==
The judicial career is based on the professional character of officials and employees, on the effectiveness of their performance, on the guarantee of equal opportunities of access to the function for all citizens qualified for it, and on the consideration of merit as the main basis for entry, permanence and promotion in the service. The administration of the judicial career is oriented toward attracting and retaining the most suitable servants, providing them with fair remuneration, adequate welfare and occupational health programs, and continuous training that includes preparing officials and employees in the management and control techniques necessary to ensure the quality of the service, while at the same time demanding of them irreproachable conduct and a satisfactory level of performance at all times.

The positions of magistrates of the Tribunals and of the Chambers of the Sectional Councils of the Judiciary, judges and employees who by express provision of law are not freely appointed and removed are career positions.

The Office of the Attorney General shall have its own autonomous career regime subject to the principles of merit competition and evaluation of service, aimed at guaranteeing equality of opportunity for entry, permanence and promotion in the service of the officials and employees who comprise it.

To hold career positions in the Judiciary, in addition to the requirements demanded by general provisions, it is necessary to have satisfactorily passed the selection process and the evaluations provided for by law and carried out in accordance with the regulations issued for that purpose by the Administrative Chamber of the Superior Council of the Judiciary.

The merit competition is the process by which, through the evaluation of knowledge, skills, aptitude, experience, moral suitability and personality traits of applicants for positions in the judicial career, their inclusion in the Register of Eligibles is determined and their position in it is set.

== Office of the Attorney General ==
The Office of the Attorney General is composed of the Attorney General, the delegated prosecutors and the other officials determined by law. The Attorney General is elected for a term of four years by the Supreme Court of Justice, from a shortlist of three sent by the President of the Republic, and may not be re-elected.

The Office of the Attorney General is obliged to carry out the exercise of criminal action and to investigate acts that have the characteristics of a crime and that come to its knowledge through complaint, special petition, querella or ex officio, provided there are sufficient grounds and factual circumstances indicating the possible existence of one. Consequently, it may not suspend, interrupt or renounce criminal prosecution, except in the cases established by law for the application of the principle of opportunity regulated within the framework of the State's criminal policy, which shall be subject to legality review by the judge exercising the functions of guarantees control. Crimes committed by members of the Armed Forces on active duty and in relation to the service itself are excepted.

- Investigates and prosecutes.
- The Attorney General is elected by the Supreme Court of Justice from a shortlist of candidates sent by the President.
- Has delegated prosecutors in each department, in major municipalities and before the Supreme Court.
- Carries out criminal proceedings, in which a preliminary inquiry is conducted first, then the investigation or instrucción and, finally, the merit of the case file is assessed; that is, it either brings charges or dismisses.

== Special justice ==
According to Judgment C-713 of 2008, the Military Criminal Jurisdiction, the Indigenous Jurisdiction and the Special Jurisdiction for Peace exercise jurisdiction but are not part of the Judiciary.

=== Military criminal justice ===
This is the specialized justice which, in accordance with the mandate of article 221 of the Political Constitution, is responsible for the investigation and trial of punishable conduct committed by members of the Armed Forces on active duty and in relation to the service itself.

=== Indigenous jurisdiction ===
This refers to the authority of indigenous peoples, who may perform jurisdictional functions within their territories in accordance with their own norms. However, these may not be contrary to the Constitution or the laws.

- Indigenous judges

=== Special Jurisdiction for Peace ===
The JEP has the function of investigating, hearing and judging in order to administer transitional justice and to receive all information on crimes committed in the context of the armed conflict before 1 December 2016.

- Tribunal for Peace.
- Chamber for the Acknowledgment of Truth, Responsibility and Determination of Facts and Conduct.
- Chamber of Amnesty or Pardon.
- Chamber for the Definition of Legal Situations.
- Investigation and Prosecution Unit Chamber.
- Executive Secretariat.

== See also ==
- Executive branch of Colombia
- Government of Colombia
- Judicial districts of Colombia
