= Ministry of Justice and Law (Colombia) =

Government ministry of Colombia

- Ministerio de Justicia y del Derecho

Ministry overview
- Formed: 4 May 2011
- Preceding Ministry: Ministry of the Interior and Justice
- Headquarters: Carrera 9 № 12C-10 Bogotá, D.C., Colombia
- Employees: 500
- Annual budget: 78.213,867 COP 2017
- Ministry executive: Minister
- Child agencies: INPEC; ANDJE; SPC; SNR
- Website: www.minjusticia.gov.co

The Ministry of Justice and Law (Spanish: Ministerio de Justicia y Derecho), is the national executive ministry of the Government of Colombia responsible for the administration of law and justice, equivalent to the justice ministries of other countries.

In 2011, President Juan Manuel Santos Calderón, as part of a wider justice reform and reshuffle of executive ministries, separated the Ministry of the Interior and Justice into two ministries as had been the case before their merger in 2002 as part of then-President Álvaro Uribe Vélez's ministerial reform.

The Ministry of Justice and Law is a central-level entity, head of the Justice and Law Sector, which leads the development of public policy with regard to justice and the protection of rights, within the framework of a Legal Social and Democratic State. The Justice and Law sector, which leads, is made up of the following related bodies:

• The Unidad de Servicios Penitenciarios y Carcelarios (Prison and Penitentiary Services Unit) USPC.

• The Instituto Nacional Penitenciario y Carcelario (National Prison and Penitentiary Unit) INPEC

• The Agencia Nacional para la Defensa Jurídica del Estado (National Agency for Legal Defense of the State) ANDJE.

• La Superintendencia de Notariado y Registro (Superintendency for Notaries and Registries) SNR.

• La Dirección Nacional de Estupefacientes (National Narcotics Directorate) DNE (in liquidation).

== See also ==
- List of ministers of justice and law of Colombia
