= Deaths in November 1985 =

The following is a list of notable deaths in November 1985.

Entries for each day are listed alphabetically by surname. A typical entry lists information in the following sequence:

- Name, age, country of citizenship at birth, subsequent country of citizenship (if applicable), reason for notability, cause of death (if known), and reference.

== November 1985 ==
=== 1 ===
- Joseph A. Brandt, 86, American academic administrator.
- Joe Fitzgerald, 73, Australian politician, MP (1949–1955).
- Vladimir Gorokhov, 74, Soviet football player and coach.
- Yvonne Hagnauer, 87, French humanitarian.
- Ōuchiyama Heikichi, 59, Japanese sumo wrestler, brain cancer.
- Joe Hewitt, 84, Australian Air Force commander.
- Lev Lyulyev, 77, Soviet artillery designer.
- Rick McGraw, 30, American professional wrestler.
- Lucien Michard, 81, French Olympic racing cyclist (1924).
- John Phillips, 75, British Anglican prelate.
- Arnold Pihlak, 83, Estonian footballer.
- Roy L. Riales Sr., 75, American politician, member of the Arkansas House of Representatives (1939–1948).
- John Shaheen, 70, American financier.
- Jaishanker Manilal Shelat, 77, Indian judge.
- Nikolay Shelenkov, 65, Soviet Olympic equestrian (1952, 1956).
- Phil Silvers, 74, American actor (The Phil Silvers Show, A Funny Thing Happened on the Way to the Forum, Top Banana).
- O. M. Watts, 84, British master mariner and author.
- Wetzel Whitaker, 77, American filmmaker (Johnny Lingo) and animator (Cinderella, Fantasia)

=== 2 ===
- Margaret Ashley-Towle, 81-83, American archaeologist.
- Don Bragg, 52, American basketball player, heart attack.
- Gloria Brennan, 37, Australian Aboriginal community leader.
- Fred Enke, 88, American football and basketball player and coach.
- Alan Hime, 56, English swimmer.
- Alexander Knight, 61, Australian politician.
- Volodymyr Kubijovyč, 85, Polish-Ukrainian anthropologist and Nazi collaborator.
- William Lummis, 99, British military historian.
- Konrad Morawski, 71, Polish actor.

=== 3 ===
- John Eldridge, 87, British general.
- Robert W. Grow, 90, American general.
- Olav Haug, 69, Norwegian furniture designer.
- Richard D. Kisling, 61, American Air Force airman, chief master sergeant (1971–1973), amyotrophic lateral sclerosis.
- Robert P. Knowles, 69, American politician, member of the Wisconsin Senate (1955–1977).
- Gar Moore, 65, American actor.
- Robert Nelson, 65, American football player.
- Phoumi Nosavan, 65, Laotian general, stroke.
- Tan Tong Hye, 71, Singaporean-born Malaysian politician.
- J. M. Wallace-Hadrill, 69, British historian.

=== 4 ===
- Cus D'Amato, 77, American boxing manager and trainer (Mike Tyson, Floyd Patterson, José Torres), pneumonia.
- Rudolf Fernau, 87, German actor.
- Charley Fusari, 61, Italian-born American boxer, cancer.
- Liam Grainger, 72, Irish footballer.
- James Groppi, 54, American Catholic priest and civil rights activist, brain cancer.
- Ferdinand Kramer, 87, German architect.
- Adonis A. Kyrou, 62, Greek filmmaker.
- George S. Myers, 80, American icthyologist.
- Tony Nicholson, 47, English cricketer
- Line Noro, 85, French actress.
- A. A. Phillips, 85, Australian writer and social commentator, coined "cultural cringe".
- Gale H. Stalker, 95, American politician, member of the U.S. House of Representatives (1923–1935), arteriosclerosis.
- Hilda Vaughan, 93, Welsh novelist.
- Richard Williams, 54, American trumpeter, kidney cancer.

=== 5 ===
- Arnold Chikobava, 87, Soviet Georgian linguist.
- Jean Théodore Delacour, 95, French-American ornithologist.
- Ted Elsby, 53, Canadian football player.
- Spencer W. Kimball, 90, American Mormon religious leader, president of the LDS Church (since 1973), peptic ulcer disease.
- Anita Leslie, 70, British author.
- Alexander Lloyd, 2nd Baron Lloyd, 73, British politician.
- Elise Muller, 66, South African writer.
- Horace Strutt, 81, Australian politician.
- William Tweddell, 88, English golfer.
- Ernest Weiss, 59, Canadian Olympic sailor (1968).

=== 6 ===
- Harold Bradley, 73, American college basketball coach.
- Breandán Breathnach, 73, Irish music collector.
- Joel Crothers, 44, American actor, lymphoma.
- Jean Kane Foulke du Pont, 94, American social activist and philanthropist.
- Pike Johnson, 89, American football player.
- Hans Keller, 66, Austrian-born British musicologist.
- Sanjeev Kumar, 47, Indian actor, heart attack.
- Wallace Newman, 84, American football and baseball player and coach.
- Sara Woods, 63, British author.

=== 7 ===
- Joe O'Meara, 78, Australian footballer.
- Parr Tate, 84, Irish parasitologist.
- Alexander Thom, 91, Scottish engineer and archaeoastronomer.
- Friedrich Traugott Wahlen, 86, Swiss agronomist and politician.
- Notable Colombian casualties during the Palace of Justice siege:
  - Andrés Almarales, 49-50, guerrilla fighter, suicide.
  - Fanny González Franco, 50-51, lawyer, shot.
  - Alfonso Jacquin, 32, lawyer and guerrilla fighter, shot.
  - Alfonso Patiño Rosselli, 62-63, judge, shot.
  - Alfonso Reyes Echandía, 53, jurist, shot.

=== 8 ===
- Lili Bleeker, 88, Dutch physicist and optical instrument designer.
- Günter Busarello, 25, Austrian Olympic wrestler (1980, 1984).
- Nicolas Frantz, 86, Luxembourgish racing cyclist.
- Odd Fredriksen, 64, Norwegian footballer.
- Sir Arthur Gaitskell, 85, British colonial administrator.
- Tullio Grassi, 75, Swiss football player and manager.
- Masten Gregory, 53, American racing driver, heart attack.
- Jacques Hnizdovsky, 70, Ukrainian-born American graphic designer, sculptor.
- Frank Irwin, 88, Australian footballer.
- Laura Krey, 94, American novelist.
- Renato Mocellini, 56, Italian Olympic bobsledder (1956).
- David E. Williams, 52, American painter, complications from diabetes.

=== 9 ===
- Ludger Alscher, 69, German archaeologist.
- John Conroy, 56, British Olympic field hockey player (1952, 1956).
- Knut Enell, 98, Swedish Olympic fencer (1912, 1920).
- Yakov Fokanov, 85, Soviet general.
- Miriam Ibling, 90, American muralist.
- Herbert Kuhlmann, 70, German-Argentine SS commander and fugitive.
- Henk van der Linden, 66, Dutch footballer.
- Lewis Luxton, 75, Australian Olympic rower (1932).
- Mary MacLaren, 85, American actress.
- Marie-Georges Pascal, 39, French actress, suicide.
- Helen Rose, 81, American costume designer.
- Stasys Šačkus, 78, Lithuanian basketball player.
- Bob Steele, 84, Australian cricketer.
- Jan Strube, 93, Dutch painter.
- Peter Sutton, 53, Australian Olympic basketball player (1956).
- L. H. C. Tippett, 83, English statistician, traffic collision.

=== 10 ===
- Frédéric Braconier, 84, Belgian artist.
- Vida Brest, 60, Yugoslav novelist.
- Milton Burton, 83, American chemist, heart attack.
- Givi Javakhishvili, 72, Soviet Georgian politician, prime minister (1953–1975).
- Ernst Jõesaar, 80, Estonian sculptor.
- Verner Laaksonen, 90, Finnish Olympic runner (1928).
- Billy Lane, 81, English footballer.
- Curtis D. MacDougall, 82, American journalist.
- John Moher, 76, Irish politician, TD (1954–1965).
- James Moroka, 94, South African politician.
- Suzy Paine, 39, British economist.
- Len Peto, 93, English-Canadian-American ice hockey executive.
- Olav Sunde, 82, Norwegian Olympic javelin thrower (1928, 1932).
- Branislav Vukosavljević, 56, Yugoslav football player and manager.
- Sir Peveril William-Powlett, 87, British naval officer.

=== 11 ===
- Edgar Cherry, 71, American football player.
- Leopoldo Fernández, 80, Cuban comedian.
- James Hanley, 88, British novelist.
- Archie Jackson, 84, English footballer.
- Roy Lee, 68, American baseball player.
- Pelle Lindbergh, 26, Swedish ice hockey player, traffic collision.
- Henri Médus, 81, French singer.
- Frank Mulroney, 82, American baseball player.
- Gerolamo Quaglia, 83, Brazilian-born Italian Olympic wrestler (1924, 1928).
- Arthur Rothstein, 70, American photographer.
- Leni Schmidt, 78, German Olympic runner (1928).
- Iivari Yrjölä, 86, Finnish Olympic athlete (1924).

=== 12 ===
- Howie Auer, 77, American football player.
- Wattie Barclay, 91, New Zealand rugby player and administrator.
- Anna V. Brown, 70-71, American elder rights activist.
- Leonid Butkevich, 67, Soviet sniper.
- Catherine Christian, 84, English novelist.
- Willi Dehnkamp, 82, German politician.
- Bill Fallowfield, 71, British rugby coach.
- Vasily Garbuzov, 74, Soviet politician and economist, minister of finance (since 1960).
- Mary Gojack, 49, American politician, member of the Nevada Senate (1974–1978), cancer.
- Hildebrand Gregori, 91, Italian Catholic monk.
- John Keith McBroom Laird, 78, Canadian politician, senator (1967–1982).
- Jarma Lewis, 54, American actress.
- Marcelo Nubla, 87, Filipino lawyer and banking executive.
- Krishnamoorthy Puranik, 74, Indian poet.
- Stanislaw Trabalski, 89, German politician.
- Augie Walsh, 81, American baseball player.
- Dicky Wells, 78, American trombonist, cancer.

=== 13 ===
- Carlos Amado, 60-61, Argentine Olympic rower (1948).
- Richard Amsel, 37, American illustrator, AIDS.
- Trygve Andersen, 76, Norwegian wrestler.
- Emil N. Baar, 94, Austrian-born American jurist.
- Arturo Díaz, 45, Chilean football player and manager.
- Peter Larsen, 81, Danish Olympic wrestler (1936).
- Max Miller, 73, American jazz musician, heart failure.
- William Pereira, 76, American architect, cancer.
- Alexander Pokryshkin, 72, Soviet flying ace.
- George Robert Vincent, 87, American sound recording engineer.

=== 14 ===
- Dmitry Belyayev, 68, Soviet geneticist and zoologist (domesticated silver fox), cancer.
- Alick Bryant, 82, Australian soldier.
- Grace Gregory, 83-84, American set decorator.
- Robert Beverly Hale, 83-84, American artist and curator.
- Oscar Harstad, 93, American baseball player.
- Wellington Koo, 97, Chinese politician and diplomat, premier (1927) and acting president (1926–1927).
- Lee Mulleneaux, 77, American football player.
- Luke Nelson, 91, American baseball player.
- J. Aird Nesbitt, 78, Canadian businessman.
- John Patrick O'Loughlin, 74, Australian Roman Catholic prelate.
- Emir Rodríguez Monegal, 64, Uruguayan-American literary scholar.
- Armistead I. Selden Jr., 64, American politician and diplomat, member of the U.S. House of Representatives (1953–1969), cancer.

=== 15 ===
- Bill Horrocks, 80, English-born Australian cricketer.
- John Morison Inches, 82, Scottish brewing executive.
- Méret Oppenheim, 72, German-born Swiss artist.
- Dimitar Panov, 83, Bulgarian actor.
- Carlos Spadaro, 83, Argentine footballer.
- Riggs Stephenson, 87, American baseball player.
- David Strub, 88, Liechtensteiner politician.

=== 16 ===
- Ivan Ashtine, 61, Trinidad and Tobago cricketer.
- Ludwig Bertele, 84, German optics constructor.
- Helen Bell Bruton, 87, American artist.
- Stuart Chase, 97, American economist.
- Swami Chidbhavananda, 87, Indian religious scholar.
- Lou Fleischer, 94, American composer.
- Simon Michael Fung Kui Heong, 54, Malaysian Roman Catholic prelate, stomach cancer.
- Walter Jupé, 69, German actor.
- Léon Lampo, 62, Belgian Olympic basketball player (1948).
- Gulshan Nanda, 65-66, Indian novelist and screenwriter.
- Fred Price, 84, English footballer.
- Omayra Sánchez, 13, Colombian child, landslide.
- John Sparkman, 85, American politician, member of the U.S. Senate (1946–1979) and House of Representatives (1937–1946), heart attack.

=== 17 ===
- J. Amado Araneta, 78, Filipino businessman.
- Michael Birkin, 73, British RAF officer.
- Avgust Černigoj, 87, Yugoslav painter.
- Janet Doe, 90, American librarian.
- Thomas Gow Brown, 83, Scottish rugby union player.
- Michalis Kaltezas, 15, Greek protestor, shot.
- Prince Karl Alfred of Liechtenstein, 75, Liechtensteiner royal.
- Roger Laroque, 75, New Caledonian politician.
- Lon Nol, 72, Cambodian politician, president (1972–1975), prime minister (1966–1967, 1969–1971).
- Thomas Quiwonkpa, 45, Liberian general, shot.
- Jimmy Ritz, 81, American actor, heart disease.
- Sukat Subandi, 59, Indonesian military officer.
- Gheorghe Ursu, 59, Romanian poet and dissident, beaten.
- Wang Jinzhang, 77-78, Chinese politician.

=== 18 ===
- Stephan Henrik Barratt-Due, 66, Norwegian violinist.
- Andy Bieber, 68, Canadian football player.
- Paul Bixler, 78, American football player and sports coach.
- Nicholas Deak, 80, Hungarian-born American banker, murdered.
- Harold Gade, 86, American politician, member of the Wisconsin State Assembly (1948–1952).
- Dimitris Gogos, 82, Greek singer.
- Mario Góngora, 70, Chilean historian.
- Orton Sutherland Hintz, 78, New Zealand journalist.
- Masayoshi Ise, 78, Japanese painter.
- Osvaldo Lamborghini, 45, Argentine writer, heart attack.
- Sir Hugh Lucas-Tooth, 82, British politician, MP (1924–1929, 1945–1970).
- Stella Marks, 97, Australian artist.
- Michael Mooney, 55, American Olympic sailor (1948), cancer.
- Yrjö Nikkanen, 70, Finnish Olympic javelin thrower (1936).
- Dmitry Ryabyshev, 91, Soviet general.
- Inger Thorén, 72, Swedish chemical engineer.
- Owen Thuerk, 67, American football player.

=== 19 ===
- Juan Arvizu, 85, Mexican singer.
- Charlie Billington, 58, English footballer.
- Robert Breiter, 76, Swiss Olympic ice hockey player (1928).
- Damon W. Cooper, 66, American naval admiral.
- Ralph Dorfman, 74, American biochemist, Parkinson's disease.
- Mike Erskine, 71, English motorcycle racer.
- Stepin Fetchit, 83, American actor and comedian, pneumonia.
- Lewis Harfield, 80, English cricketer.
- Sir Evan Meredith Jenkins, 89, British colonial administrator.
- George H. Mahon, 85, American politician, member of the U.S. House of Representatives (1935–1979).
- John Mant, 88, Australian solicitor.
- Phil Sarboe, 74, American football player and coach.
- Richard M. Sims Jr., 75, American judge.
- Lall Singh, 75, Indian cricketer.
- Carmen Soler, 61, Paraguayan educator.
- Bob Synnott, 73, American basketball player.
- Douglas Tennant, 78-79, British trade unionist.

=== 20 ===
- Jenny Armstrong, 82, Scottish shepherd and art model.
- Maurice Courteau, 71, Canadian ice hockey player.
- Peggy Feury, 61, American actress, traffic collision.
- Victor Henry, 42, English actor, complications from a traffic collision.
- Henning Klopper, 90, South African politician.
- Harry Pollard, 66, American mathematician.
- Carmen Sánchez, 87, Spanish actress and dancer.
- George Sharpe, 77, Canadian politician.
- Wade Van Valkenburg, 86, American politician, member of the Michigan House of Representatives (1947–1956).
- Jerzy Ziętek, 84, Polish politician.

=== 21 ===
- Anne S. K. Brown, 79, American historian.
- Derek Jewell, 57-58, British journalist.
- Ramnath Kenny, 55, Indian cricketer.
- Johannes Marott, 68, Danish actor.
- Ivo Serdar, 51, Croatian actor.
- Philaret Voznesensky, 82, Russian-American Russian Orthodox prelate.
- Mirosława Zakrzewska-Kotula, 52, Polish volleyball and handball player and coach.

=== 22 ===
- Gudolf Blakstad, 92, Norwegian architect.
- Owen Churchill, 89, American Olympic sailor (1932).
- Aaron R. Fisher, 90, American soldier.
- Ruby Gainfort, 95, Australian academic administrator.
- Tahu Hole, 79, New Zealand journalist.
- Alan Lavery, 81, Australian footballer.
- Richard Milton Martin, 69, American logician.
- Epifanio Méndez Fleitas, 68, Paraguayan politician and banker.
- Robert Newton, 96, Canadian academic administrator.
- Merlo J. Pusey, 83, American biographer, cancer.
- David Rabkin, 36-37, South African anti-apartheid activist, military training accident.
- María Sabina, 91, Mexican poet and curandera.

=== 23 ===
- Manfred Björkquist, 101, Swedish Lutheran prelate.
- Roger Brand, 42, American cartoonist, liver failure.
- Vernon Griffiths, 91, English-born New Zealand conductor, composer.
- Walter Jenkins, 67, American political aide.
- Leonhard Kass, 74, Estonian footballer.
- Heinz Lorenz, 72, German propagandist.
- Concepción Mendizábal Mendoza, 92, Mexican civil engineer.
- Leslie Mitchell, 80, British broadcaster and actor.
- Melville Nimmer, 62, American lawyer, cancer.
- Lupita Pallás, 59, Mexican actress.
- Nina Quartero, 77, American actress.
- Gholam-Hossein Sa'edi, 49, Iranian writer, cirrhosis.
- Sam West, 81, American baseball player.

=== 24 ===
- Sinan Alaağaç, 25, Turkish footballer, heart attack.
- Hilbert Leigh Bair, 91, American World War I flying ace.
- René Barjavel, 74, French author.
- Percy Bice, 70, Australian footballer.
- C. Buddingh', 67, Dutch poet and translator.
- Christina Hole, 88-89, British folklorist.
- Laurence Lafore, 67-68, American historian.
- Josef Miller, 95, German theologian.
- Maurice Podoloff, 95, Russian-born American basketball executive, NBA commissioner (1946–1963).
- George Raynor, 78, English football player and manager.
- Big Joe Turner, 74, American singer ("Shake, Rattle and Roll", "Flip, Flop and Fly", "Corrine, Corrina"), kidney failure.
- John Waddington, 66, South African cricketer.
- Alice Miles Woodruff, 84, American virologist.

=== 25 ===
- Xenia Borovansky, 82, Russian-born Australian dancer and choreographer.
- Évelyne Cloupet, 85, French Olympic jumper (1928).
- Walther Dahl, 69, German flying ace.
- Frances Davidson, Viscountess Davidson, 91, British politician, MP (1937–1959).
- José L. Duomarco, 80, Uruguayan physiologist.
- Rebii Erkal, 74, Turkish footballer.
- Geoffrey Grigson, 80, British writer and art critic.
- Franz Hildebrandt, 76, German-British theologian.
- Ray Jablonski, 58, American baseball player.
- Elsa Morante, 73, Italian author.
- Dick Price, 55, American Gestalt therapist, hiking accident.
- Don Stephenson, 50, Canadian football player.

=== 26 ===
- Frank Beaty, 66, American basketball player.
- Emma Marie Birkmaier, 77, German-born American educator, leukemia.
- Marco Ernesto, 62, Panamanian impressionist painter.
- Sergei Gerasimov, 79, Soviet filmmaker, heart attack.
- Fred Gordon, 85, Canadian ice hockey player.
- Alice Habsburg, 95, Swedish aristocrat.
- Bill Jackson, 67, Irish basketball player.
- Yashwant Dinkar Pendharkar, 86, Indian poet.
- Pablo Serrano, 77, Spanish sculptor.
- Monk Sherlock, 81, American baseball player.
- Vivien Thomas, 75, American surgeon, pancreatic cancer.

=== 27 ===
- Azhar Shah Qaiser, 64, Indian Islamic scholar and journalist
- Peter Bessell, 64, British politician, MP (1964–1970), emphysema.
- Fernand Braudel, 83, French historian.
- Harry Harvey Sr., 84, American actor.
- André Hunebelle, 89, French film director and glassmaker.
- Rendra Karno, 65, Indonesian actor.
- George Opperman, 50, American graphic designer (Atari logo), lung cancer.

=== 28 ===
- Georgia Burke, 107, American actress.
- Melvin G. deChazeau, 85, American economist.
- Hermann Harm, 91, German SS officer.
- Charlie Kerr, 79, New Zealand cricketer.
- Park Krygger, 87, Australian footballer.
- Chaim Pinchas Lubinsky, 70, Polish-American rabbi.
- Johnny Blood, 82, American football player.
- Thomas Megarry, 87, Hong Kong civil servant.
- Mary Aquinas Monaghan, 66, Irish missionary, cancer.
- Red Pearlman, 87, American football player.
- Eyre Saitch, 80, American basketball player.
- Max Saltsman, 64, Canadian politician, MP (1964–1979), liver cancer.
- John P. Shanley, 70, American journalist.
- Jirō Shirasu, 83, Japanese politician.
- Josef Smistik, 80, Austrian footballer.
- A. Lee Smith, 70, American football coach.
- Bernard Zakheim, 87, Polish-born American muralist.

=== 29 ===
- Eduards Andersons, 71, Latvian basketball player.
- Fred Benham, 81, English-born Scottish cricketer.
- Angelo Cattaneo, 84, Italian Olympic cyclist (1928).
- Eric W. Cochrane, 57, American historian.
- Sir Charles Davidson, 88, Australian politician, MP (1946–1963).
- Gaston Féry, 85, French Olympic sprinter (1920, 1924).
- Jack Garland, 77, Northern Irish boxer.
- Gérard Hoarau, 34, Seychellois politician, shot.
- Josef Josten, 72, Czech journalist.
- Thomas Gaetano LoMedico, 81, American sculptor.
- Claes Christian Olrog, 73, Swedish-Argentine ornithologist.
- Bill Scott, 65, American voice actor (The Adventures of Rocky and Bullwinkle and Friends, George of the Jungle), heart attack.
- Chappie Sheppell, 71, American soccer player.

=== 30 ===
- Tom Aikens, 85, Australian politician.
- Marc Aryan, 59, French-Belgian musician, cardiac arrest.
- Vladimir Arzamaskov, 34, Soviet Olympic basketball player (1976).
- Sir Chau Sik-nin, 82, Hong Kong politician and businessman.
- Jim Cutmore, 86, English cricketer.
- Jim Grant, 91, American baseball player.
- Rudolf Schoenert, 74, German flying ace.
- Phil Tucker, 58, American filmmaker (Robot Monster).
- Marie Waife, 93, Russian-born American writer.
- Joseph Zaritsky, 94, Russian-Israeli artist.
