= Ernest Weiss =

Ernest Weiss may refer to:

- Ernest Weiss (sailor) (1926–1985), Canadian sailor
- Ernest David Weiss (1902–1982), naturalised British Jewish transport economist and Soviet espionage agent
- Ernst Weiss (1882–1940), Austrian physician and author
- Ernst August Weiß (1900–1942), or Weiss, German mathematician
