= Henk van der Linden =

Henk van der Linden may refer to:

- Henk van der Linden (footballer)
- Henk van der Linden (filmmaker)
