= Frank Irwin =

Australian rules footballer

Personal information
- Full name: Francis Patrick Irwin
- Born: 7 February 1897; West Melbourne, Victoria
- Died: 8 November 1985 (aged 88); Albert Park, Victoria
- Original team: Stawell

Playing career^{1}
Years	Club	Games (Goals)
1922–24	Brighton (VFA)	46 (43)
1925–27	Carlton	45 (0)
1929–31	Brighton (VFA)	26 (2)
- ^{1} Playing statistics correct to the end of 1927.

Francis Patrick Irwin (7 February 1897 – 8 November 1985) was an Australian rules footballer who played with Carlton in the Victorian Football League (VFL).
