= Odd Fredriksen =

Norwegian footballer (1921-1985)

Personal information
- Date of birth: 12 February 1921
- Place of birth: Sarpsborg, Norway
- Date of death: 8 November 1985 (aged 64)
- Position: Forward

International career
| Years | Team | Apps | (Gls) |
| 1947 | Norway | 1 | (0) |

Odd Fredriksen (12 February 1921 – 8 November 1985) was a Norwegian footballer. He played in one match for the Norway national football team in 1947.
