= Carmen Soler =

Paraguayan educator, poet and communist

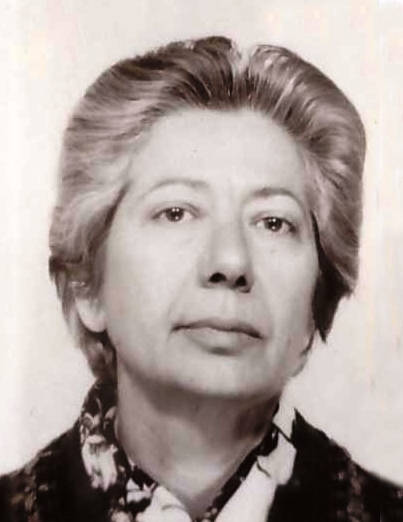
- Born: Carmen Soler; 4 August 1924; Asunción, Paraguay
- Died: 19 November 1985 (aged 61); Buenos Aires, Argentina
- Occupations: Teacher, Poet
- Movement: Paraguayan Communist Party, United Front of National Liberation, Democratic Women's Union, Revolutionary Febrerista Party

Carmen Soler (June 4, 1924 – November 19, 1985) was a Paraguayan educator, poet and member of the Paraguayan Communist Party. She was noted for being imprisoned and exiled several times for fighting against the dictatorship of Alfredo Stroessner.

== Early life and education ==
Soler was born on June 4, 1924, in Asunción, Paraguay, Where she attended both primary and secondary school.

== Career ==
After completing her studies and already married to Marcus Aurelius Aponte, she moved to Chaco where she worked as a bilingual rural school teacher. There she first encountered social problems such as villagers without land, and the extreme poverty in which the Indians lived.

=== Political militancy and poetry ===
In 1947, she joined the Febreristas, a socialist movement in which her brother, Miguel Angel Soler, was already active. She participated actively in the struggle against the dictator Moríñigo, wanting to address social inequalities that existed in the country.

After the Civil War of 1947, she was forced into exile in Buenos Aires, where she continued to contact the Febreristas Liberation Bloc, defending the Marxist positions within the movement.

It was in exile that she began to compose poems, in which she related the experiences of her life. In her poems are her aesthetic definitions, her commitment, her longing for her homeland. Those dated 1955, 1960 and 1968 contain her testimony from prison.
