= Frédéric Braconier =

Belgian artist (1901–1985)

Frédéric François Albert Braconier (10 August 1901 – 10 November 1985) was a Belgian artist from the Wallonia whose œuvre comprises at least 150 paintings and monotypes of considerable variety both in subject and style. He painted landscapes, city views and portraits and created numerous abstract compositions. Braconier was active for more than sixty years, artistically “reinventing” himself several times. The diversity of his works, bearing witness both to his curiosity and his willingness to change, makes him an interesting artist.

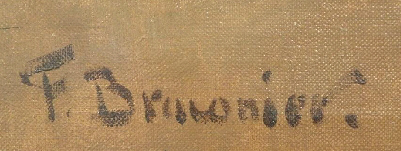
Signature of Frédéric Braconier (artist), photographed from the original of one of his paintings created in 1941.

== Early life and training ==
Braconier was born in Spa and studied at the Académie Royale des Beaux-Arts in nearby Liège under the masters Évariste Carpentier (1845–1922), Xavier Wurth (1869–1933), Richard Heintz (1871–1929) and Alfred Martin (1888–1950). Hence, at the beginning of his career Braconier was mainly influenced by impressionist landscape painters, most of whom belonged to the luminist movement, regionally called L’École Liégoise du Paysage. During the 1930s Braconier took classes with surrealist painter Auguste Mambour (1896–1968) and with the portraitist Adrien Dupagne (1889–1980), both of whom had stylistically grown beyond impressionism.

Realizing that it would be difficult to make a living from art alone, Braconier had taken up studies at the Université de Liège, graduating as a doctor of sciences (docteur ès sciences physicochimiques) in 1928.

== Professional life ==
From 1939 to 1942 Braconier worked with fellow artist Georges Bouillon (1891–1943) whose early death, at 52, hardly left Braconier untouched. Some of the two men's creations seem to be related to each other, such as Braconier's painting Le pont Saint-Lambert à Vresse and Bouillon's Paysage au pont à Vresse-sur-Semois, both depicting the same bridge.

In the early 1940s Braconier painted at least two portraits in realist style, both pictures showing remarkable craftsmanship in this genre which, however, does not seem to have been of interest to him in his later years.

In 1945 Braconier participated in founding the Association pour le progrès intellectuel et artistique de la Wallonie (APIAW) which had been conceived in 1943 when Belgium was still occupied by the Germans. Subsequently, Braconier's works were exhibited at Brussels, Maastricht, Verviers and Liège.

As a scientist Braconier rose to be head of the research department of the Société Belge de l’Azote et des Produits chimiques du Marly at Liège. For his achievements in the service of Belgian industry he was appointed Chevalier de l’Ordre de la Couronne by King Baudouin of Belgium in November 1951. The international Société de Chimie Industrielle awarded Braconier an honorary membership in 1958. That same year Braconier invented a chemical process known as SBA (the acronym for Société Belge de l’Azote) for making acetylene from methane. On the whole, Braconier was a prolific inventor in the field of organic chemistry, many patent claims on behalf of SBA mentioning his name.

In or about 1958, the year of the Brussels World's Fair Expo 58 for which the famous Atomium was created, Braconier turned to abstraction. Pictures from this phase, such as Le rouge et le bleu, show Braconier reducing objects to elementary structures of vivid colour. Subsequently, he took the further step into completely non-representational art, though he never abandoned titles referring to place names or other phenomena from concrete reality.

From 1964 on he mostly painted on glass or plexiglass, his creations sometimes resembling chemical or micro-organic structures. At least one of his pictures was created using an old technique known as Verre églomisé. He and his wife moved to Ramatuelle in the Département Var (France). Frédéric Braconier died in 1985; his grave is situated at the Ramatuelle village cemetery.

== Posthumous Fame ==
Most of Braconier's works appear to be in private hands. The leaflet to the 1973/1974 exhibition, cataloguing 50 of his abstract works, mentions private collections in Belgium, France, Spain, Austria, Japan, and the United States. According to the same leaflet, the Musée de l’Art Wallon at Liège (now a department of the Musée des Beaux-Arts de Liège - MBA) owns one or several of his paintings. One of the larger collections seems to be the one owned by the artist's widow, Mme. Monique Braconier.

== Literature ==
- L. Koenig: Frédéric Braconier, in: Société Royale des Beaux-Arts de Liège (ed.), [Untitled leaflet issued on the occasion of an exhibition from 11 December 1973 to 6 January 1974]
- L. Koenig: La peinture au pays de Liège, 1951, p. 130.
- Jacques Parisse: La peinture à Liège au XXe siècle (Actuel XX), p. 186.
