= Herbert Kuhlmann =

- Born: 7 April 1915; German Empire
- Died: 9 November 1985 (aged 70); Tucumán Province, Argentina
- Military career
- Allegiance: Nazi Germany
- Branch: Waffen-SS
- Service years: 1936–45
- Rank: Obersturmbannführer
- Units: SS Division Wiking; SS Division Das Reich; SS Division Leibstandarte; SS Division Hitlerjugend
- Conflicts: World War II
- Awards: Knight's Cross of the Iron Cross

Herbert Kuhlmann (17 April 1915 – 9 November 1985) was a German SS commander during the Nazi era. During World War II, he served in various Waffen-SS units and was awarded the Knight's Cross of the Iron Cross. After the war, he escaped to Argentina where he assisted Nazi criminals to hide from the authorities.

== SS career ==
Kuhlmann was born in Harburg, Germany, on 7 April 1915. Kuhlmann graduated SS Junkerschule at Braunschweig in 1936 with the SS Number 118 826 and served with various SS units. In 1942, he was posted to SS Division Das Reich and later to the SS Division Leibstandarte and the SS Division Hitlerjugend.

During the Ardennes offensive he was in command of his own Kampfgruppe, which consisted of the 12th SS Panzer Regiment, 560 SS Panzerjager Battalion, Panzer Grenadier Battalion, Self-propelled Artillery Battalion and an engineer company.

== Later life ==
After the fall of the Reich, Kuhlmann escaped to Argentina. Like many within Buenos Aires' underground Nazi community, he built a fortune in business, joining the upper echelons of Buenos Aires society. The wealth and successful business-ventures of Nazis who escaped to Buenos Aires after the war was thanks in most part to the support and protection made available by the highest-ranking officials within the Argentine government. Perhaps the greatest support to Kuhlmann and his fellow Nazis came directly from the Argentine President and Nazi-sympathizer, Juan Perón, husband of the much loved, late Eva Perón.

Kuhlmann helped many other Nazis into hiding in establishing their new lives in Argentina. One of the most infamous among those he helped was Adolf Eichmann, the Third Reich functionary responsible for deportation of the Jews to death camps and concentration camps in the Final Solution. Kuhlmann provided Eichmann with a lease to a modest home in Buenos Aires' largely German suburb of Olivos, after Eichmann had spent years living in extreme isolation in the Argentine province of Tucumán, 700 miles north of the capital. Kuhlmann, on the other hand, managed a much more plush residence for himself, behind the walls of a palatial mansion in Palermo Chico, the embassy row of Buenos Aires.
