= Lewis Harfield =

English cricketer

Personal information
- Full name: Lewis Harfield
- Born: 16 August 1905; Cheriton, Hampshire, England
- Died: 19 November 1985 (aged 80); Winchester, Hampshire, England
- Batting: Right-handed
- Bowling: Right-arm medium

Domestic team information
- Years: Team
- 1925–1931: Hampshire

Career statistics
Competition	First-class
Matches	80
Runs scored	2,460
Batting average	20.00
100s/50s	–/13
Top score	89
Balls bowled	1,119
Wickets	14
Bowling average	46.35
5 wickets in innings	–
10 wickets in match	–
Best bowling	3/35
Catches/stumpings	37/–
- Source: Cricinfo, 17 February 2010

Lewis Harfield (16 August 1905 — 19 November 1985) was an English first-class cricketer.

Harfield was born in August 1905 at Cheriton, Hampshire. He joined the staff at Hampshire in 1925, making his first-class debut that season against Warwickshire at Edgbaston. He played once in the 1926 County Championship against Northamptonshire, before making four appearances in the 1927 County Championship. Harfield established himself in the Hampshire side during the 1928 season, making 25 appearances in the County Championship and scoring 578 runs at an average of 16.05. The following season, he received his county cap and passed a thousand runs in a season for the only time in his career. From 27 matches in 1929, he scored 1,216 runs at an average of 26.43, recording nine half centuries. Amongst these were several notable performances, with Harfield scoring making his highest first-class score with 89 against Sussex, two half centuries (83 and 69) in the same match against Kent, and 86 against Yorkshire, who at the time possessed arguably the strongest bowling attack in county cricket. Injury beset Harfield in 1930, with a subsequent operation ruling him out for the entire season. He returned in 1931, making 22 appearances in which he scored 631 runs at an average of 19.12; however, in May 1932 Hampshire received a poor medical report on Harfield, necessitating his release.

Described by Wisden as being a batsman who was "a determined player with a sound defence", it was noted that he had the ability score all around the wicket. In 80 first-class appearances for Hampshire, he scored 2,460 runs at an average of exactly 20. With his part-time right-arm medium pace bowling, he took 14 wickets at a bowling average of 46.35. Harfield died at the Royal Hampshire County Hospital in Winchester on 19 November 1985.
