= Bill Horrocks =

English cricketer

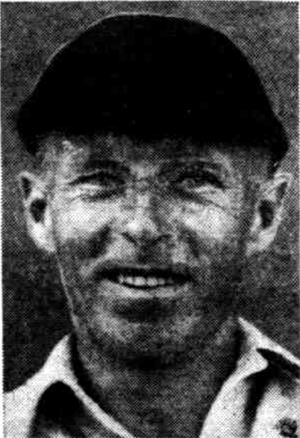

Personal information
- Full name: William John Horrocks
- Born: 18 June 1905; Warrington, Lancashire, England
- Died: 15 November 1985 (aged 80); Melbourne, Victoria, Australia
- Batting: Right-handed

Domestic team information
- Years: Team
- 1926/27–1936/37: Western Australia
- 1931–1933: Lancashire

Career statistics
Competition	First-class
Matches	29
Runs scored	1,255
Batting average	33.02
100s/50s	3/7
Top score	148*
Balls bowled	58
Wickets	0
Bowling average	–
5 wickets in innings	0
10 wickets in match	0
Best bowling	–
Catches/stumpings	9/–
- Source: Cricinfo, 27 August 2023

William John Horrocks (18 June 1905 – 15 November 1985) was an English-born cricketer who played 29 first-class cricket matches for Western Australia and Lancashire between 1927 and 1936.

== Life and career ==
Bill Horrocks' family moved from England to Perth in 1913. A right-handed batsman with a range of strokes all around the field, and an excellent fieldsman, he played first-grade cricket in Perth at 17, and made his first-class debut for Western Australia in the 1926–27 season. He impressed the English team in 1928–29 with his batting in Perth for Western Australia and an Australian XI, and one of the team, George Duckworth, a relative of his from Lancashire, suggested he return to Lancashire to play county cricket.

Horrocks played for Lancashire for three seasons, 1931 to 1933, and scored a century against Nottinghamshire in 1931, but was not generally successful, and returned to Perth.

Horrocks' highest first-class score came in the match against Tasmania in 1929–30, when he scored 65 and 148 not out. Later that season he scored 212 for his team, Claremont, to help them to win the grade cricket final. Playing for a Combined XI against the touring English team in 1936–37, he scored 140, adding 306 for the second wicket with Jack Badcock.

Horrocks married Queenie Blythe in Claremont in April 1930. One of their children was born shortly before they left England in 1934 to return to Australia, and was baptised by an Anglican clergyman on board while the ship was navigating the Red Sea.

Horrocks moved from Perth to Melbourne in 1937 and played for Essendon Cricket Club, which he captained. Between 1942 and 1946 he was a regular umpire in Melbourne senior district cricket. He died in Melbourne in November 1985.
