= Konrad Morawski =

Polish television and theatre actor

Konrad Morawski (26 November 1913 – 2 November 1985) was a Polish television and theatre actor.

Morawski was born in Pruszków. Morawski made his debut in the theatre sketch Węglem. He performed in many theaters such as the TR Warszawa, the Wola Theatre, the Jewish Theatre and the Ateneum Theatre. Morawski died in 1985 and his body rests in the Cmentarzu Komunalnym Północnym in Warsaw.
