= Alan Lavery =

Australian rules footballer, born 1904

Personal information
- Full name: Alan James Lavery
- Born: 20 May 1904; Colac, Victoria
- Died: 22 November 1985 (aged 81); Geelong, Victoria
- Height: 170 cm (5 ft 7 in)
- Weight: 70 kg (154 lb)

Playing career^{1}
Years	Club	Games (Goals)
1932–1933	Geelong	6 (0)
- ^{1} Playing statistics correct to the end of 1933.

Alan James Lavery (20 May 1904 – 22 November 1985) was an Australian rules footballer who played for the Geelong Football Club in the Victorian Football League (VFL). He played from 1932 to 1933.
