= Park Krygger =

Australian rules footballer

Personal information
- Full name: Parkin James Krygger
- Born: 29 May 1898; Ballarat East, Victoria
- Died: 28 November 1985 (aged 87); West Footscray, Victoria

Playing career^{1}
Years	Club	Games (Goals)
1926	Footscray	1 (0)
- ^{1} Playing statistics correct to the end of 1926.

Parkin James Krygger (29 May 1898 – 28 November 1985) was an Australian rules footballer who played with Footscray in the Victorian Football League (VFL).
