= Curtis D. MacDougall =

American journalist, teacher and writer

Curtis D. MacDougal
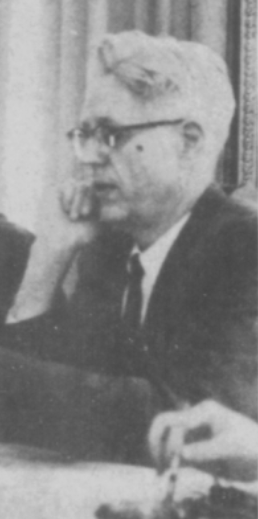
- Curtis D. MacDougall (1962)
- Born: Curtis Daniel MacDougal; February 11, 1903; Fond du Lac, Wisconsin, US
- Died: November 10, 1985 (aged 82); Evanston, Illinois, US
- Education: Ripon College, Northwestern University
- Alma mater: University of Wisconsin
- Occupations: Journalist, writer, professor
- Spouse: Genevieve MacDougal
- Writing career
- Period: 1935-1983
- Subject: Sociology
- Notable works: Interpretative Reporting (1938, 1968), Gideon's Army (1965)
- Literary movement: Democratic Party (United States), Progressive Party (United States, 1948)

Curtis Daniel MacDougall (1903 - 1985) was an American journalist, teacher and writer.

== Background ==
Curtis Daniel MacDougall was born on February 11, 1903, in Fond du Lac, Wisconsin. He obtained a BA in English from Ripon College in 1923 and a master's degree in journalism from Northwestern University in 1926). In 1933, he received his PhD in sociology from the University of Wisconsin.

== Career ==
MacDougall joined the Northwestern faculty in 1935.

=== Journalist ===
MacDougall worked for the St. Louis Star-Times and United Press. He also edited the Evanston Daily News and the Chicago Sun.

In 1936, MacDougall published an editorial that criticized the Federal Bureau of Investigation. He published a reply from FBI director J. Edgar Hoover. The FBI proceeded to surveil MacDougal for 35 years.

=== Writer ===
From 1939 to 1942, MacDougall worked for the Federal Writers' Project and edited writers included Saul Bellow and Studs Terkel.

=== Professor ===
In 1942, MacDougall began teaching at Northwestern University for thirty years through 1971. His works appear below.

=== Politician ===
In 1944, MacDougall ran for the Illinois 10th District in the US Congress, was arrested for illegally distributing political literature, and lost the election. In 1948, he ran for US Senate (presumably on the ticket of the Progressive Party, given his 1965 history of the Wallace campaign, Gideon's Army), and lost. In 1970, he ran in the 13th District primary for US Congress on the Democratic ticket and lost.

== Personal life and death ==
MacDougal married Genevieve; they had five children, of whom three survived him.

Students of Medill School of Journalism at Northwestern University called him "Doctor Mac."

MacDougal was working on the ninth edition of Interpreting Reporting when he died.

Curtis Daniel MacDougall died age 82 on November 10, 1985, following surgery.

== Honors, awards ==
- 1965: Honorary Litt.D. from Columbia College

== Legacy ==
The Newberry independent research library in Chicago houses the Curtis MacDougall Papers.

Eastern Illinois University offers a Curtis D. MacDougall Scholarship. Roosevelt University offers a "Curtis D. MacDougall Tuition Scholarship."

== Works ==
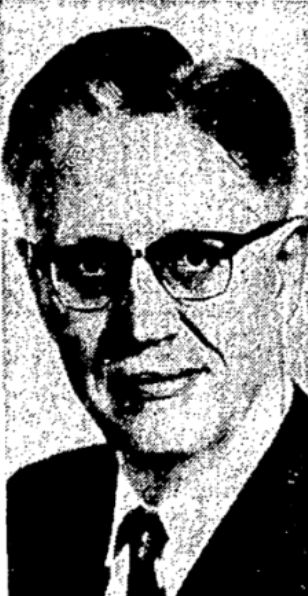
Curtis D. MacDougall (1961)

MacDougall was the author of the influential book Interpretative Reporting (1938), which has been widely cited. William David Sloan has commented that "his many books, articles, and speeches helped set the tone and added to the debate surrounding journalism education for a half century."

He authored two skeptical works Hoaxes (1958) and Superstition and the Press (1983), the latter which his family considered his chief work. His book on hoaxes has been described as a classic on the subject. MacDougall defined a hoax as "a deliberately concocted untruth made to masquerade as truth."

Books

The Library of Congress catalog contains the following:

- College course in reporting for beginners (1932)
- Teachers' manual of exercises, suggestions and bibliographical notations to be used in connection with Interpretative reporting (1938)
  - Interpretative reporting (1968)
  - Interpretative reporting (1972)
  - Interpretative reporting (1977)
  - Interpretative reporting (1982)
  - Interpretative reporting (1987)
- Hoaxes (1940)
  - Hoaxes (1958)
- Newsroom problems and policies (1941)
  - Newsroom problems and policies (1963)
- Covering the courts (1946)
- Understanding public opinion (1952)
  - Understanding public opinion (1966)
- Greater dead than alive (1963)
- Press and its problems (1964)
- Gideon's Army (3 volumes) (1965)
- Principles of editorial writing (1973)
- Superstition and the press (1983)

Books edited

- Reporters report reporters (1968)

Articles, Pamphlets, Speeches, Letters

- "Newspaper Hoaxes," Times-Index (1935)
- Letter to W.E.B. DuBois (28 September 1948)
- "Schools of Journalism Are Being Ruined" (1972)
