= Olav Haug =

Norwegian furniture designer

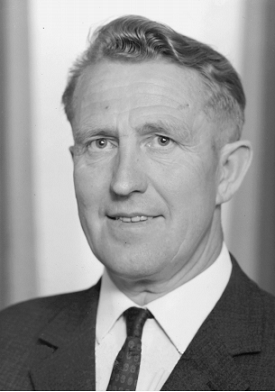
- Born: 20 July 1916; Lismarka, Norway
- Died: 3 November 1985 (aged 69)
- Occupation: Architect

Olav Haug (20 July 1916 – 3 November 1985) was a Norwegian furniture designer and master craftsman whose furniture designs demonstrated a deep understanding of woodwork and quality craftsmanship. His designs won him awards and production orders from numerous governmental and publics institutions, yet he remains a relatively unknown figure in the Norwegian mid-century design landscape.

== Early life ==
Born in Lismarka, Haug, the eldest of eight children, displayed from an early age the ability and interest for crafts and woodwork. At the age of 15 and clearly inspired by his uncles' interests in music and arts he made a violin and taught himself to play the instrument. When finalizing primary school he worked as a hired hand at a farm in Nordlien. There he was asked by the landlady if he could make a dining table with chairs. Haug began to work and created a table with six dining chairs by hand in birch wood with three insert plates for the table.

=== Education ===
- 1924–1935: 12 week course in carpentry and handcrafts, Ringsaker
- 1935–1936: National Handicrafts School
- 1937–1938: National Academy & Arts School, ‘Furniture design’ from 1937 to 1938
- 1942: Awarded a diploma in carpentry and cabinetmaking presented in Oslo in 1941 and approved in 1942 Oslo
- 1943: Qualified and approved as master craftsman in carpentry with an advanced craft certificate
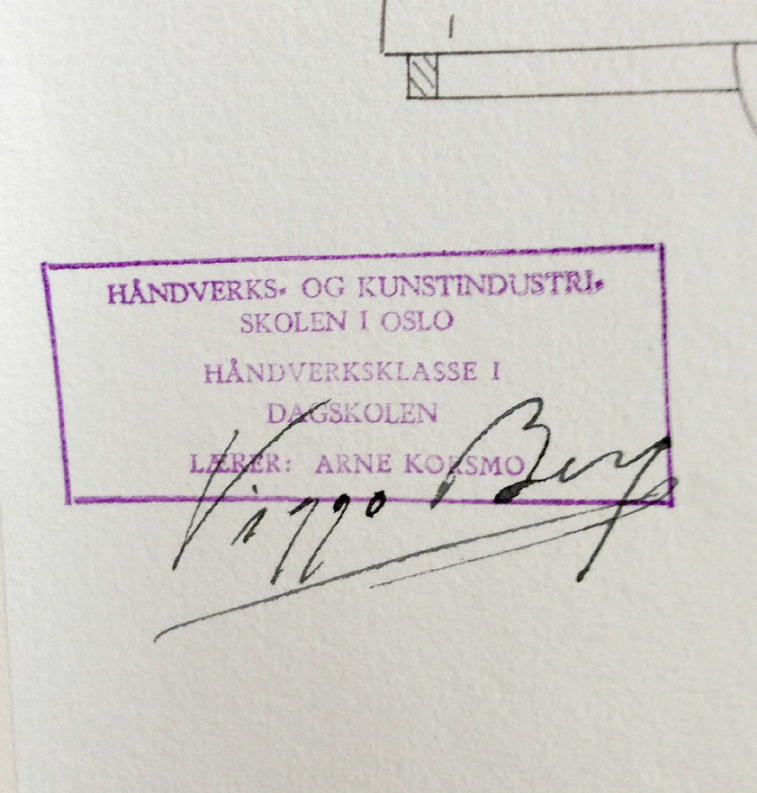
National Handcraft schoolstamp - Taught under the supervision of architect Arne Korsmo

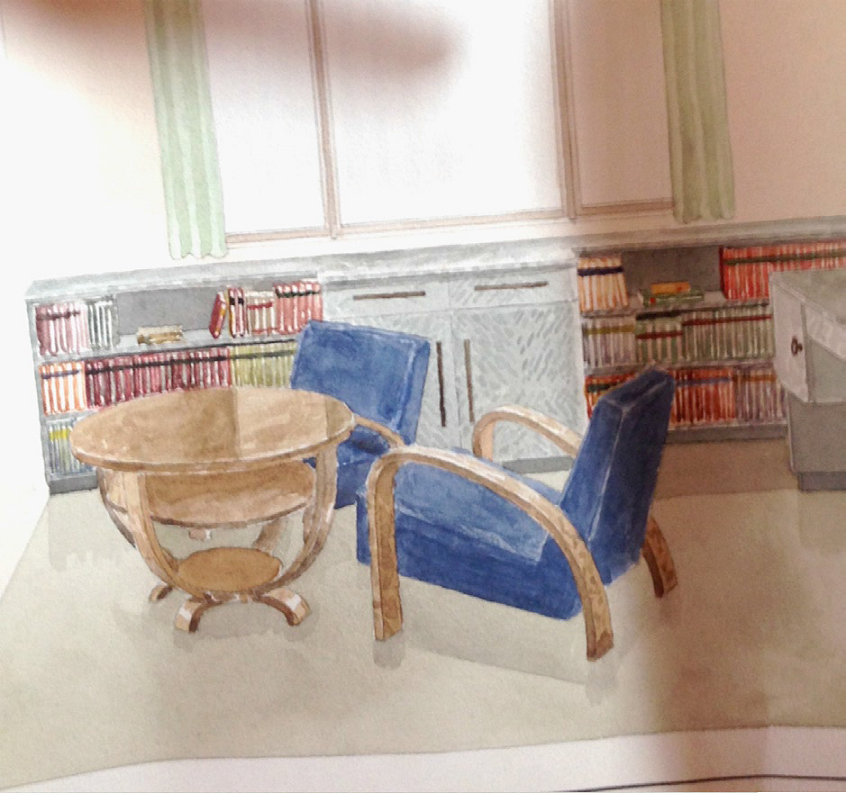
Examination for Trade Certificate

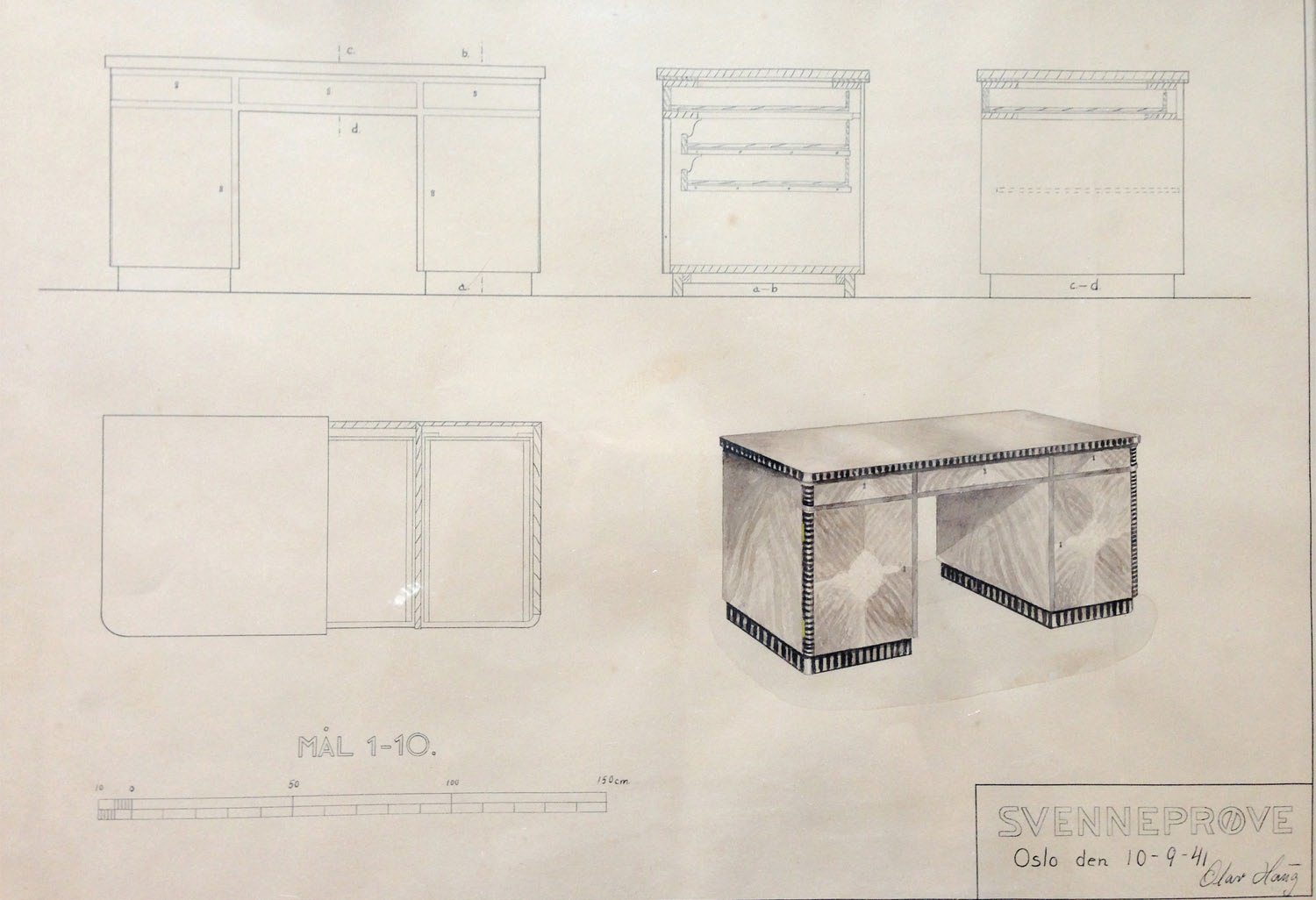
Examination for Trade Certificate

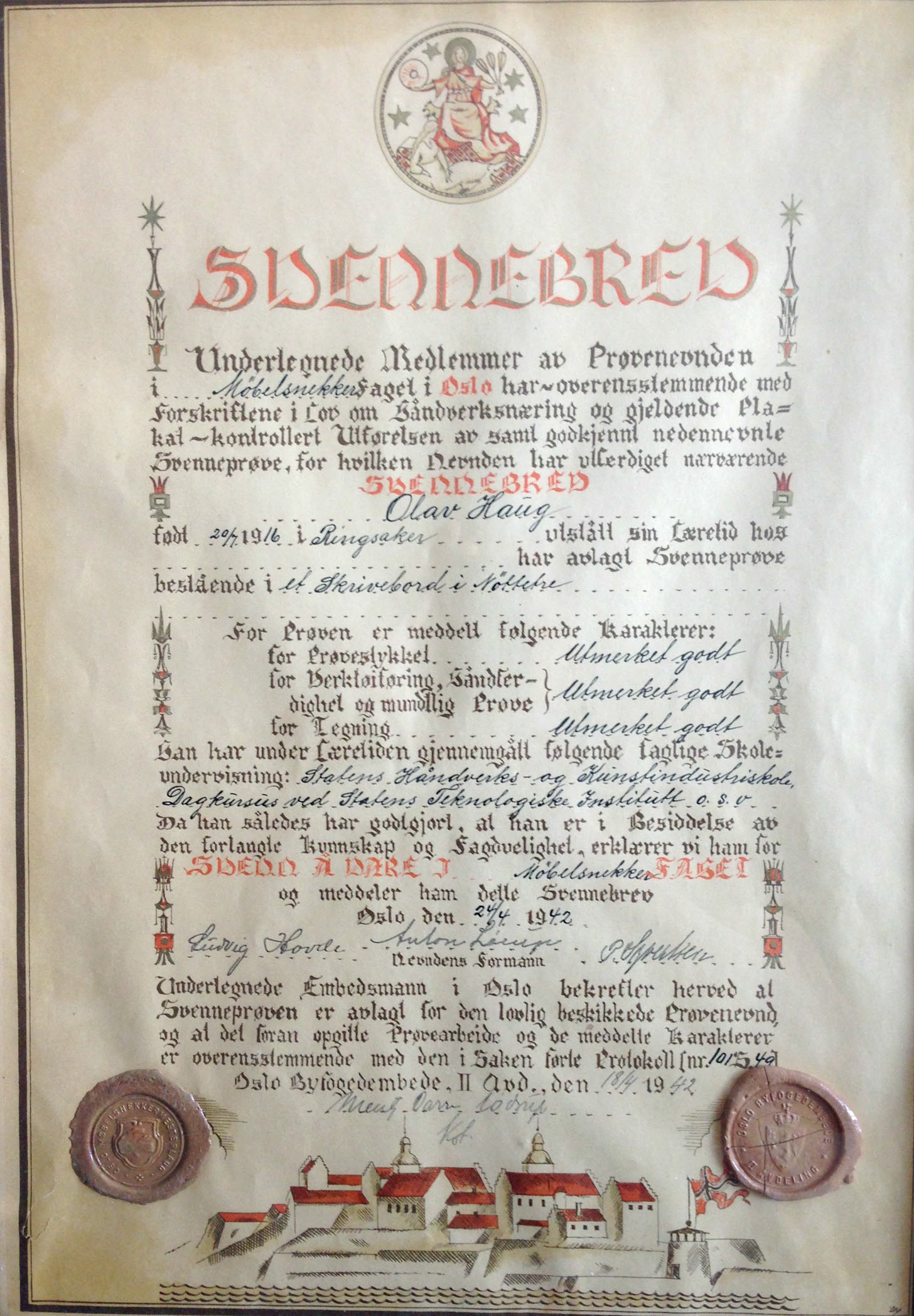
Craft certificate

=== Early Work Experience ===
Haug began his apprenticeship working at Nils Myhren carpentry workshop in Lismarka, his local district. Receiving excellent feedback from Myhren himself, Haug moved on to work for Alf Skaarer carpentry workshop in Gan. A year later he was employed by Romerike Furniture, a furniture company in Lillestrom outside Oslo. After that, Haug was employed as a master carpenter at Haakon Fjeld from 1941 to 1942. In 1942, Olav Haug began working for Elverum Mobel & Trevarefabrikk AS. It was there that he created his most recognisable signature pieces.

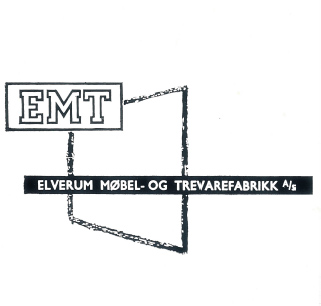
EMT - Catalogue logo and furniture stamp

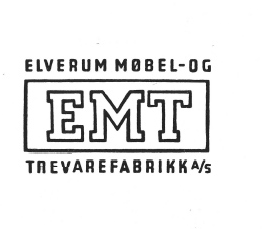
EMT - Catalogue logo and furniture stamp

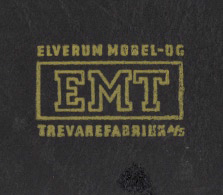
EMT - Catalogue logo and furniture stamp

== Elverum Mobel & Trevarefabrikk ==
In 1942, Olav Haug was employed at Elverum Mobel & Trevarefabrikk in Elverum as a master craftsman in charge of design and prototype development. From the early 1930s and until late in the decade, the company had produced doors and windows for private homes and offices. But as the Norwegian private economy grew, a new market for household furniture developed. It was ten that Haug designed and developed his characteristic chairs and living room furniture. During the 1950s when Scandinavian mid-century design grew onto the international prominence, Haug designed the '36' dining chair, the '46' lounge chair, the 'Fabian' rocking chair and the 'Bastian' series that became his hallmark designs at the company.

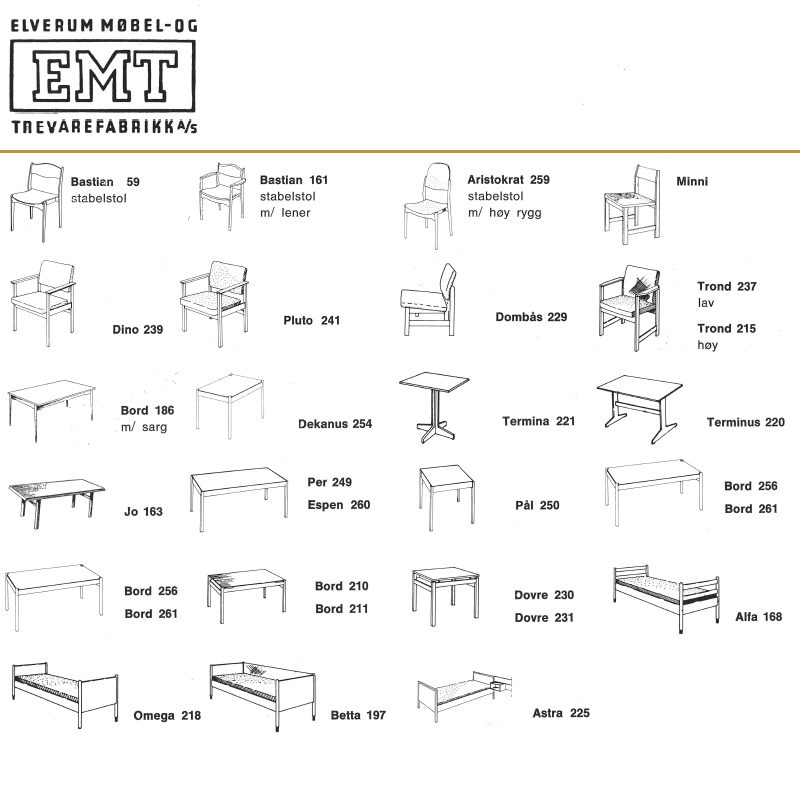
Olav Haug's furnitures at EMT

== The Bastian chair ==
The Bastian chair was manufactured with and without armrests, its frame was mainly made in beech wood with leatherette and wool upholstery or bare wood veneer. The chair was stackable and well suited for assembly halls, meeting rooms, offices and receptions areas. Haug was personally convinced that quality and durability would win him sales, so all his chair designs underwent a thorough durability test at the Norwegian Institute of Wood Technology. All chairs produced by Haug scored the highest rankings for durability, quality and construction methods.

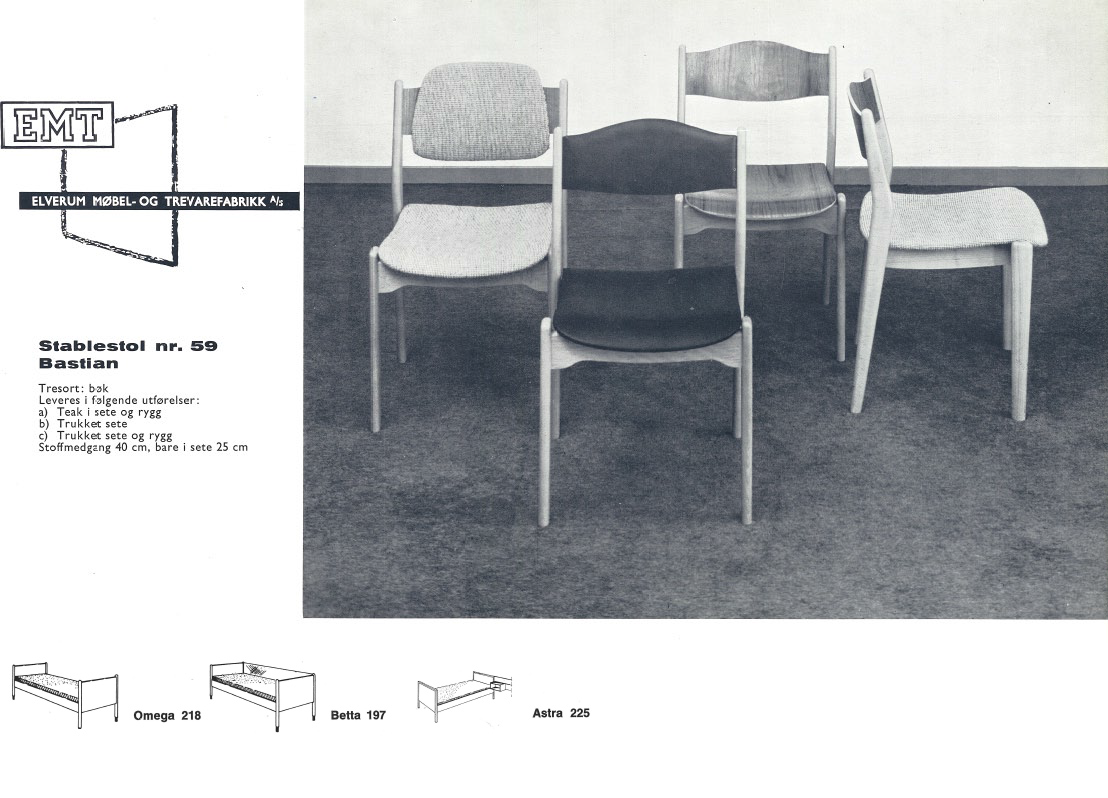
The complete Bastian chair line

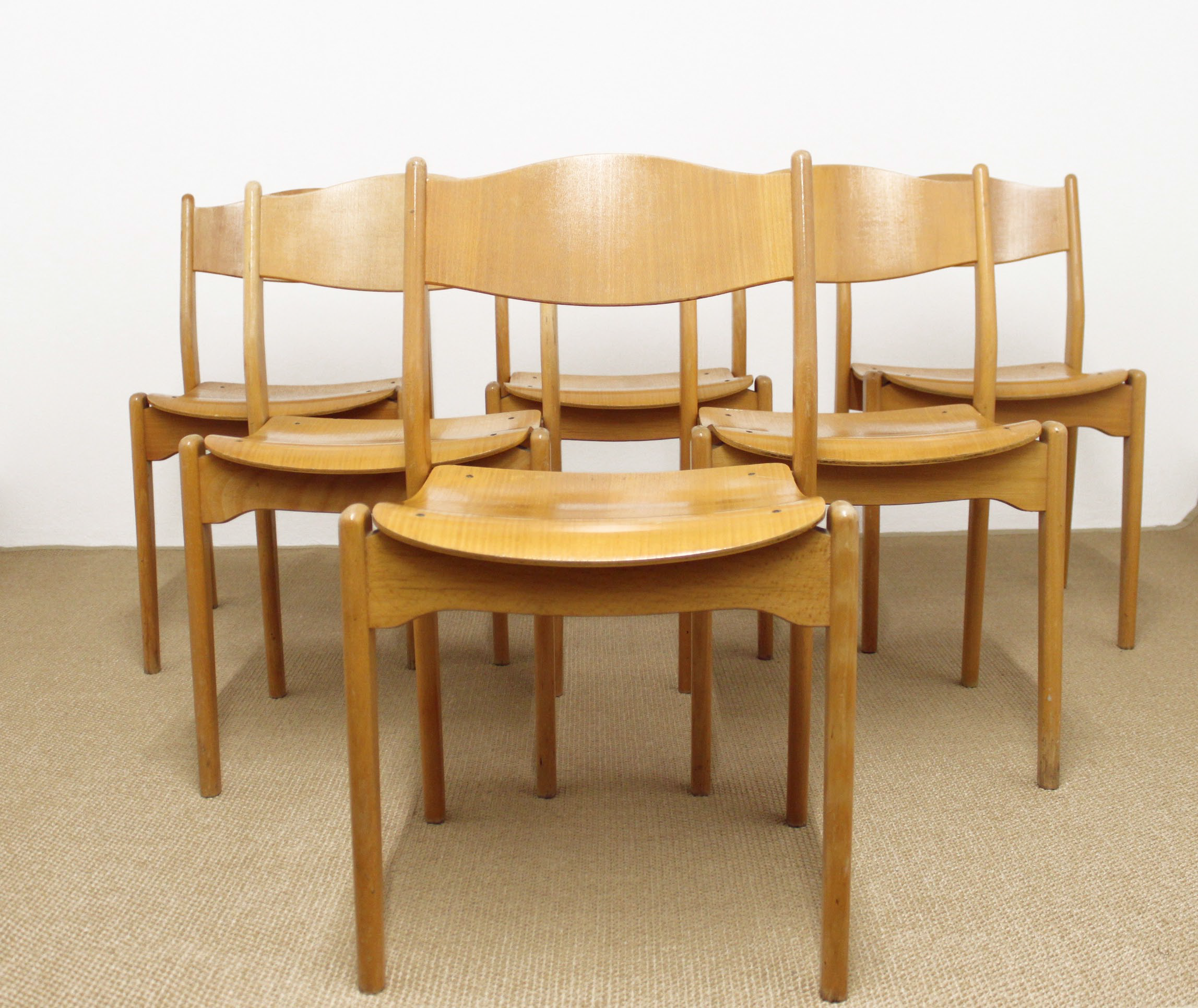
Bastian chair in beech wood

This explains the enormous success the Bastian series enjoyed and the employment it created in Elverum. With arguably the best warranty scheme in the business, each chair was dated underneath and sold with a 10-year warranty. The '36' chair was found in excellent condition to both frame structure and upholstery 60 years after the date of production. A story goes that Haug met executives and buyers either at his office or their headquarters and that Haug guaranteed the quality of his products by throwing the chairs through the window. This clearly impressed buyers and the method won him numerous new orders. It was with this method that he secured a large order for Bastian chairs for the newly built Ulleval Hospital in Oslo.

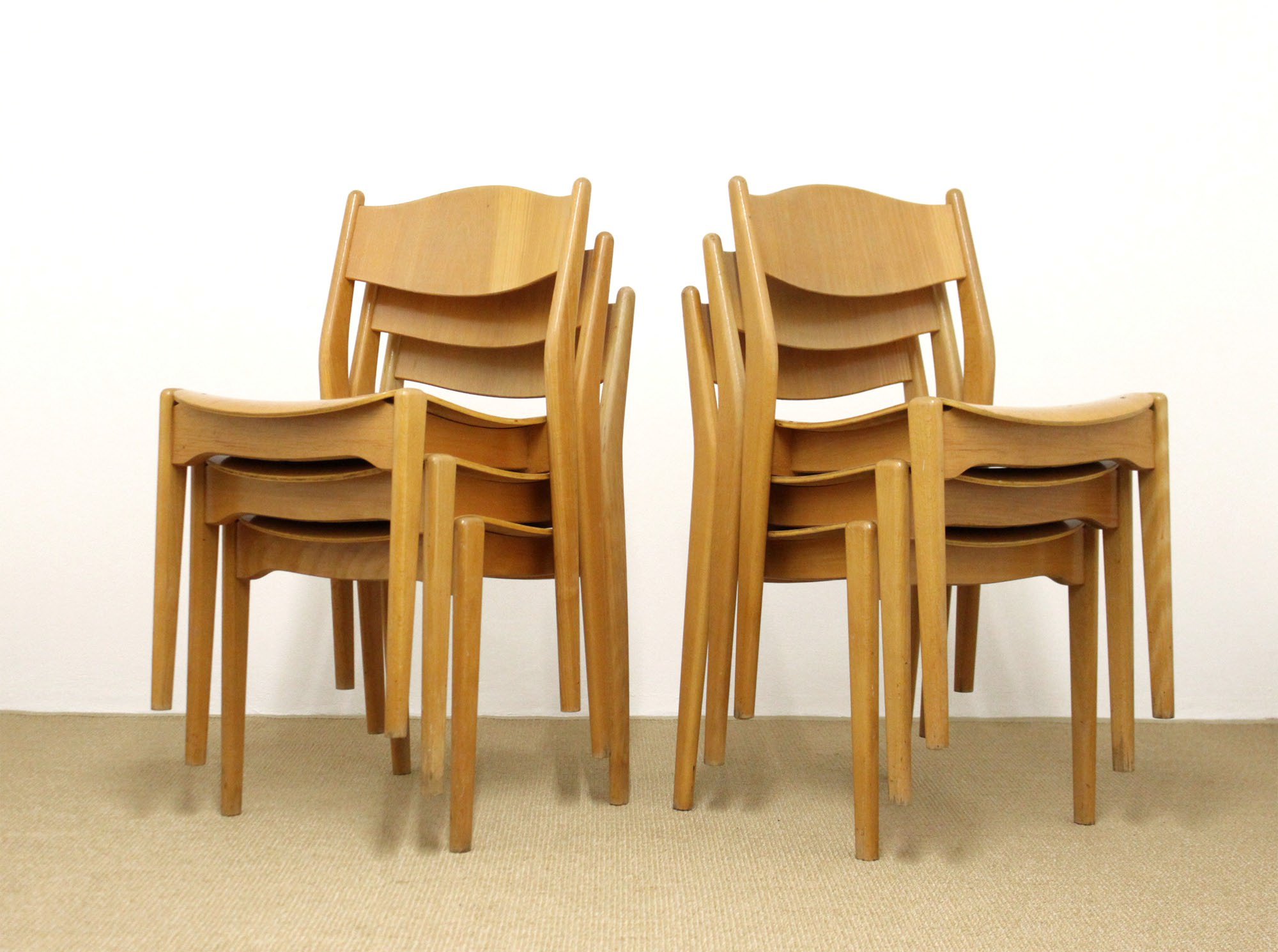
Bastian chair in beech wood

== The 36, the 46 and the Fabian Rocking Chair ==
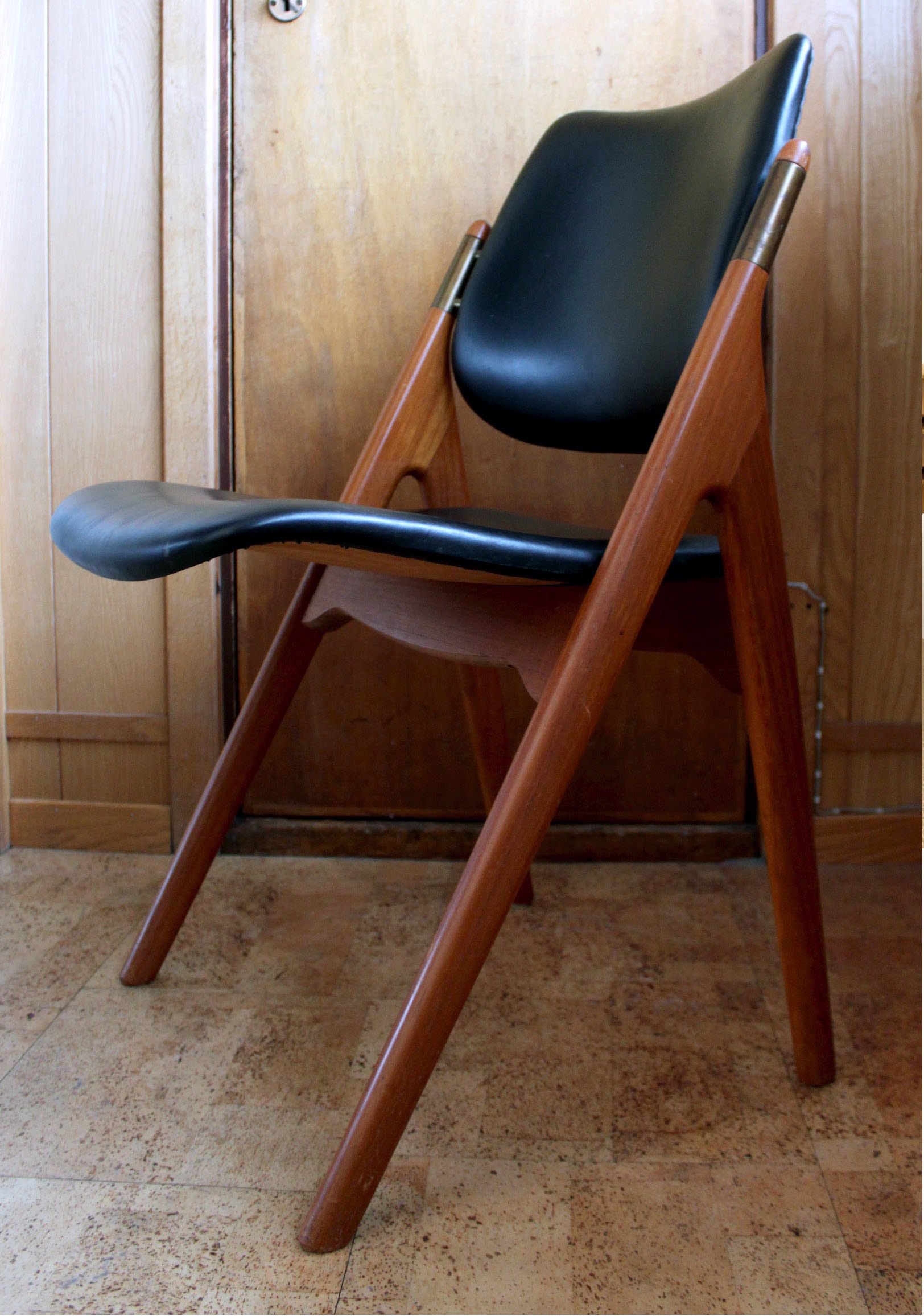
The '36' dining chair i teak and leatherette upholstery

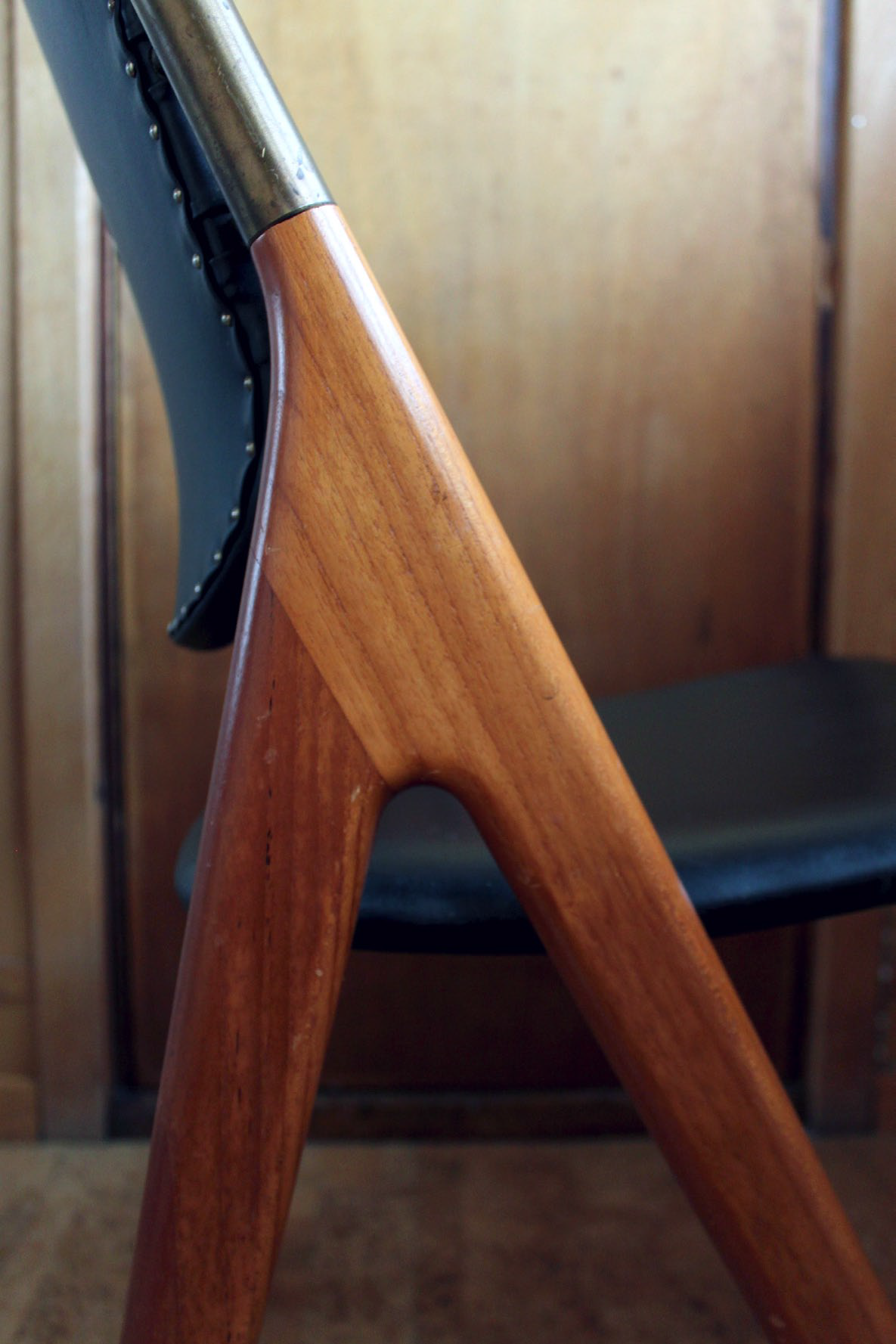
The '36' dining chair i teak and leatherette upholstery

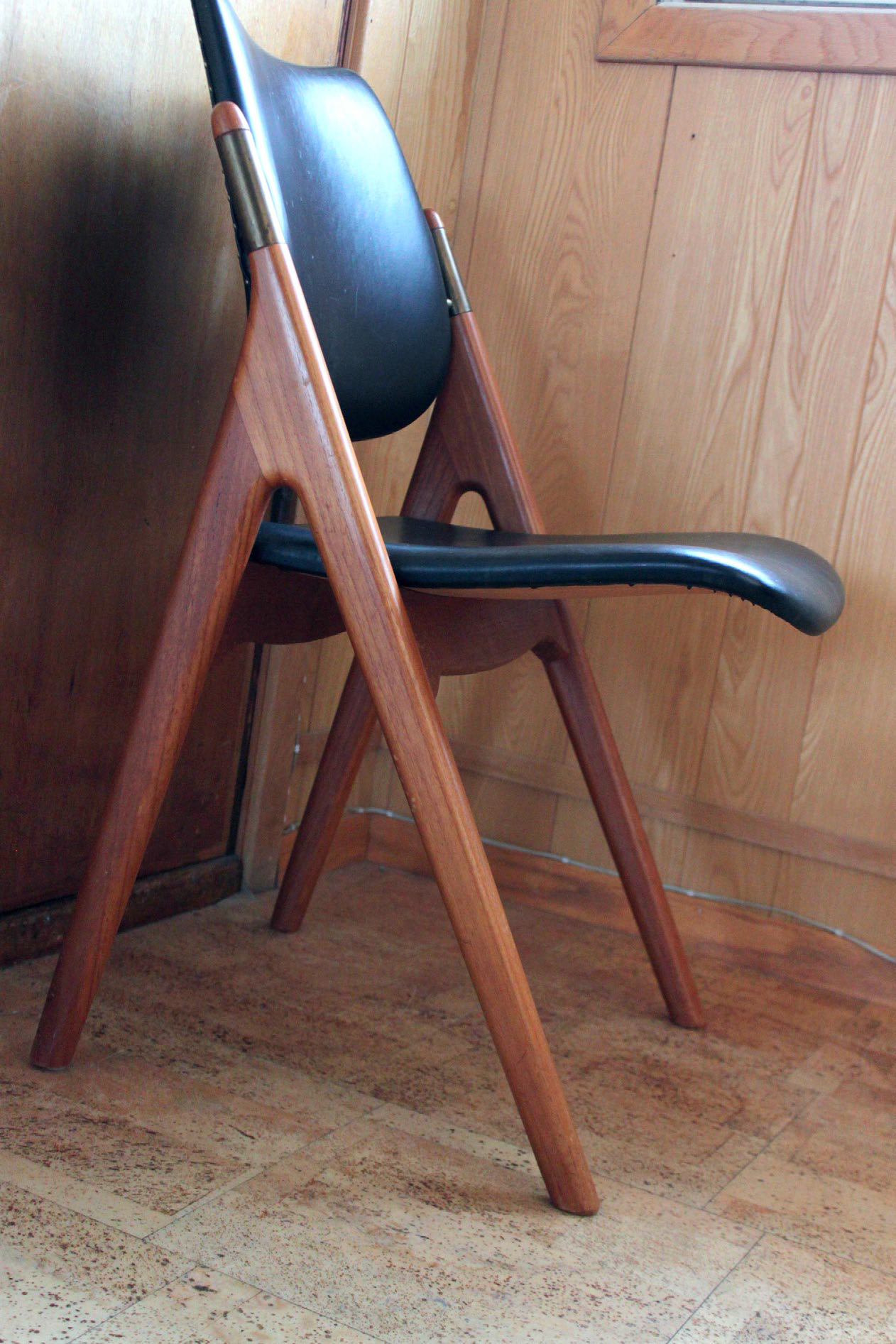
The '36' dining chair i teak and leatherette upholstery

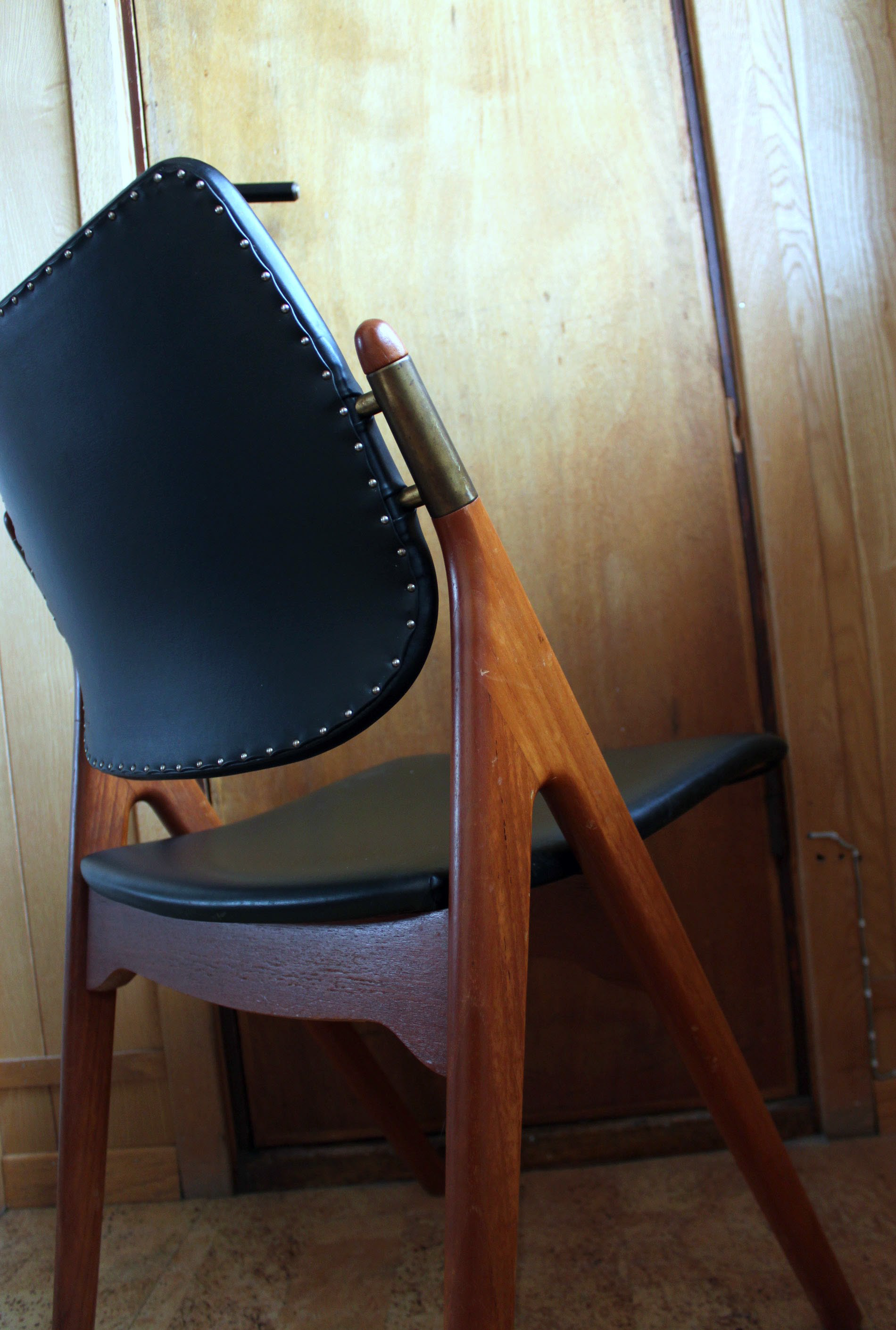
The '36' dining chair i teak and leatherette upholstery

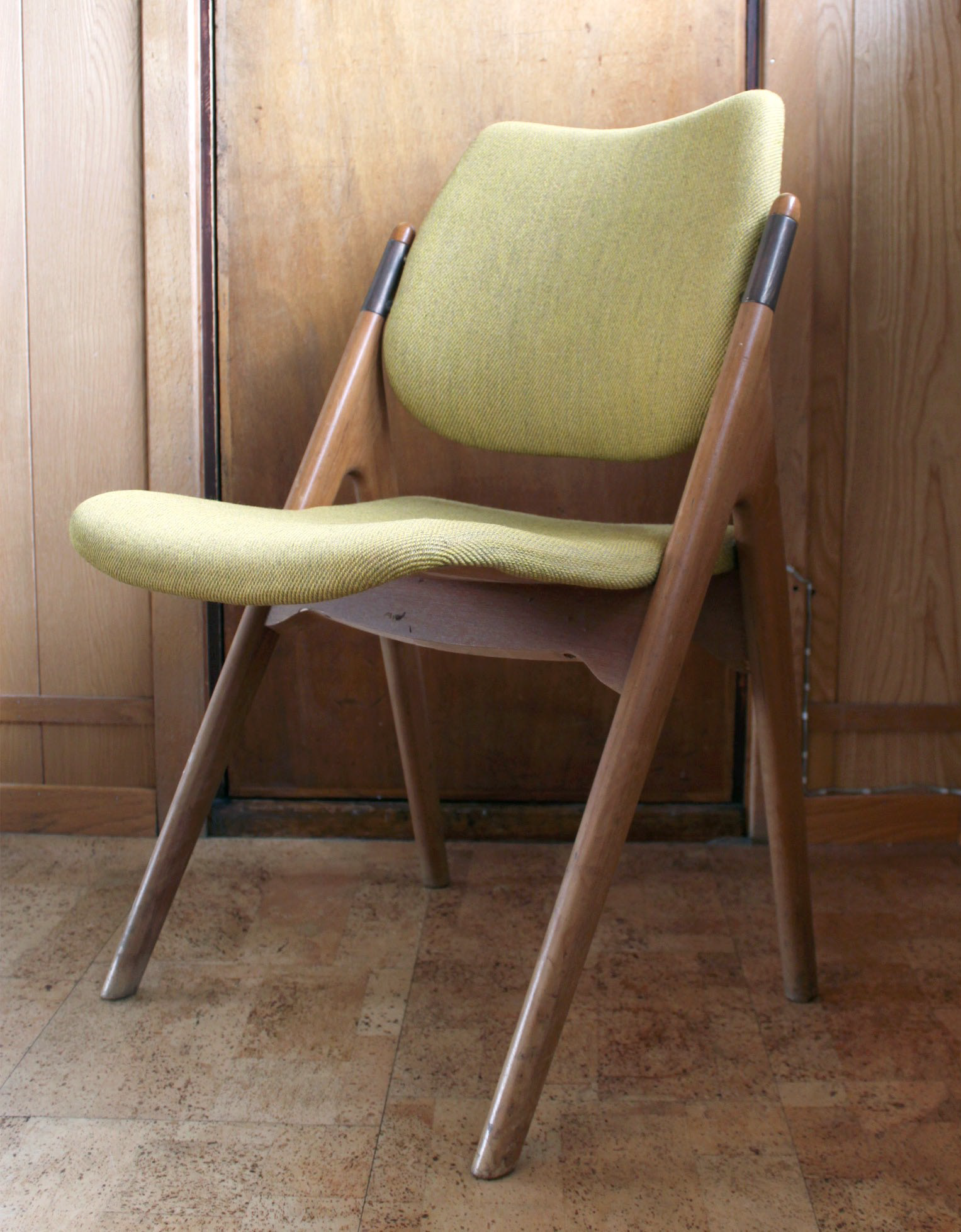
The '36' dining chair i teak and wool upholstery
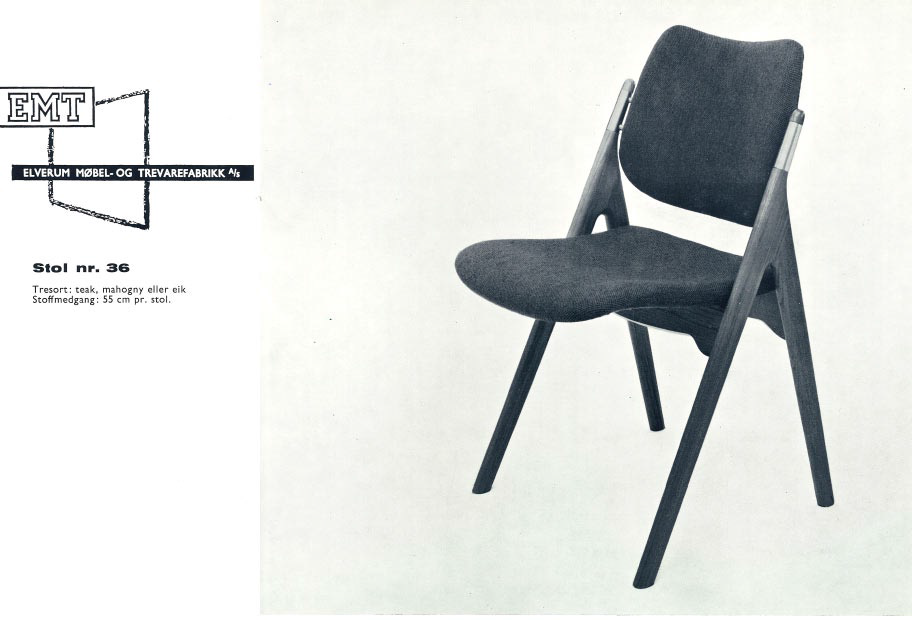
The '36 dining chair as presented in the sales catalogue

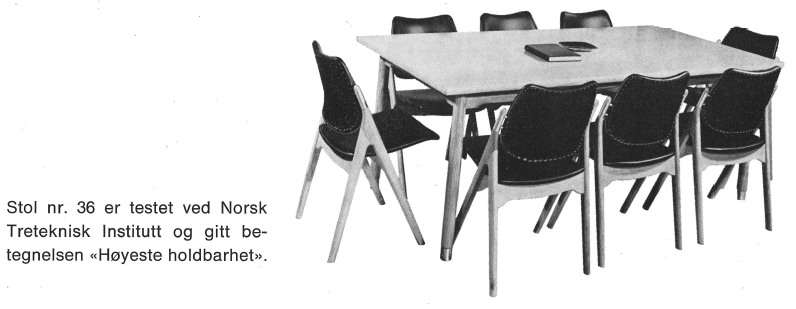
The '36' dining chair as presented in the sales catalogue

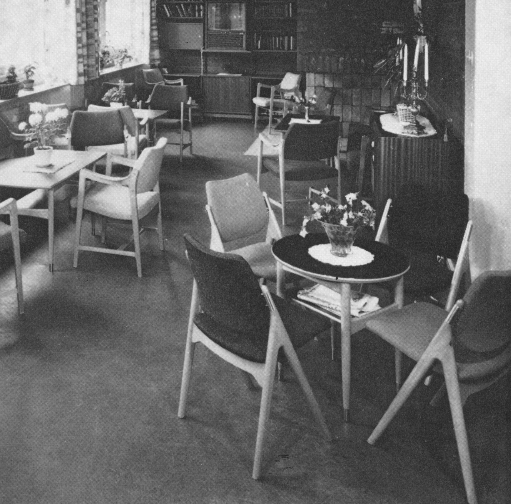
The '36' dining chair as presented in the sales catalogue

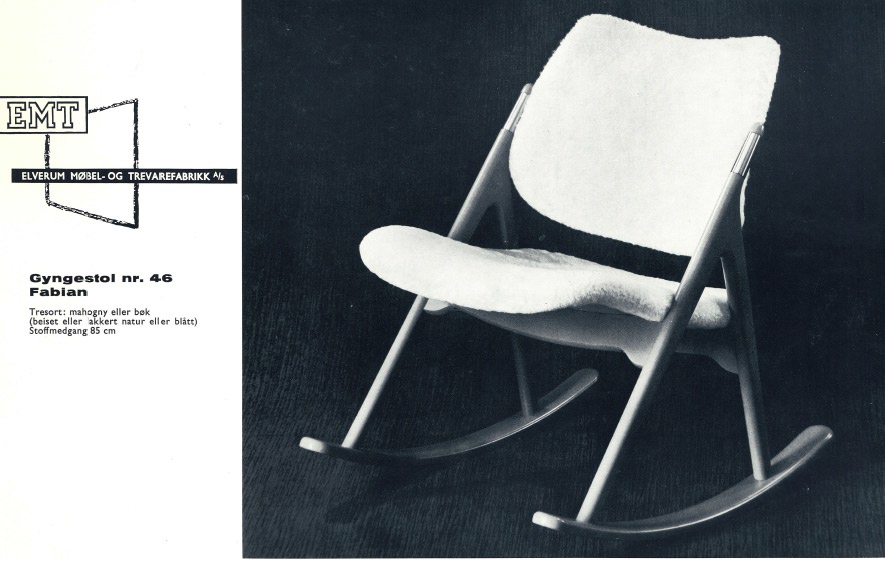
Olav Haug's '46' chair

The '46' lounge chair incorporated many of the design attributes of the '36' chair with a much wider seating and back support area and was considerably lower than the dining chair.

The 'Fabian Rocking' is essentially a '46' lounge chair mounted on either mahogany or beech runners. The Fabian’s frame was made of either mahogany or beech wood and originally upholstered in sheepskin or various wool mixes. The Fabian chair was made in few examples and is extremely rare.

== Collaboration and production with other designers ==
By the late 1950s and into the early 1960s Elverum Mobel & Trevarefabrikk was well known within the Norwegian furniture community. As a result of these close connections they manufactured for a number of prominent Norwegian furniture designers. Haug, who was known for keeping his machine park constantly up-to date with the latest technological innovations, had made them a trusted manufacturer for designers as Arne Halvorsen, Sigurd Resell, and Arne Jon Jutrem. Halvorsen had his easy-chair 'Glomma' produced at Elverum Mobel & Trevarefabrikk, while Sigurd Resell made his dining table and teak chairs and Resell had the lounge chair 'Ekko' produced there.

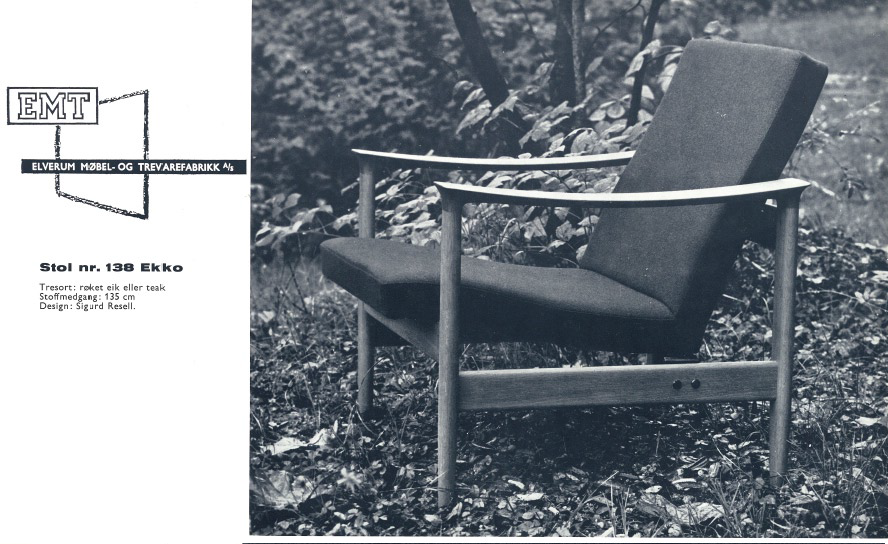
Sigurd Resell's Ekko chair

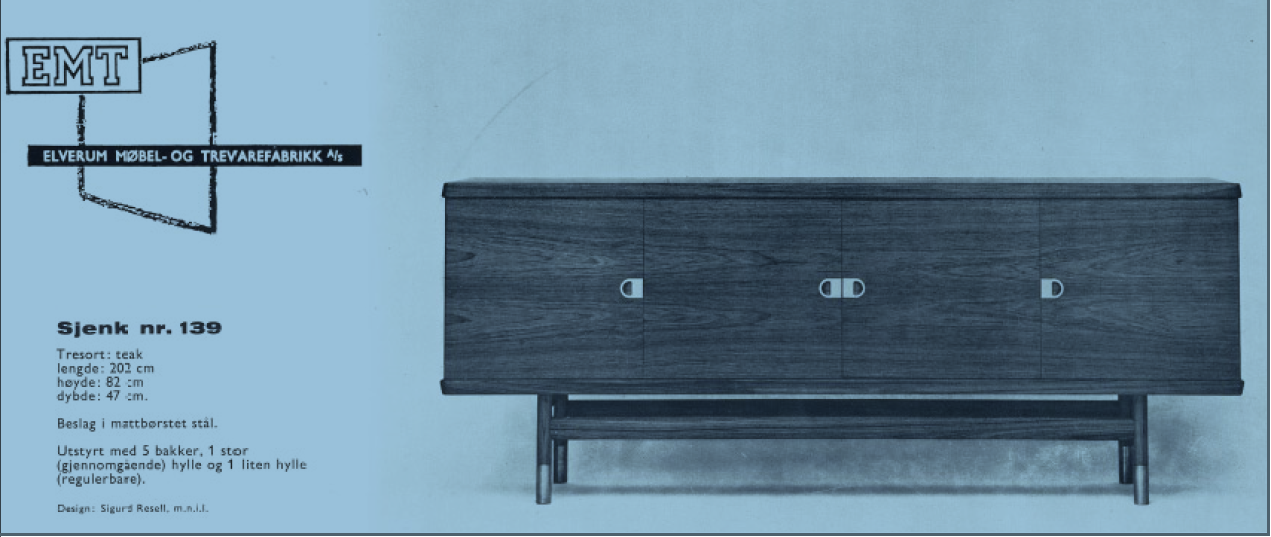
Olav Haugs side board in teak

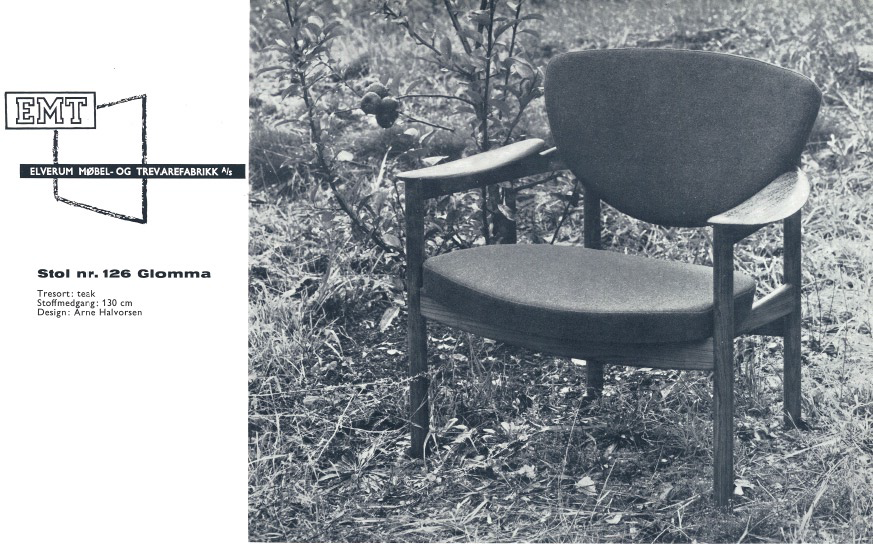
Arne Halvorsen's Glomma chair

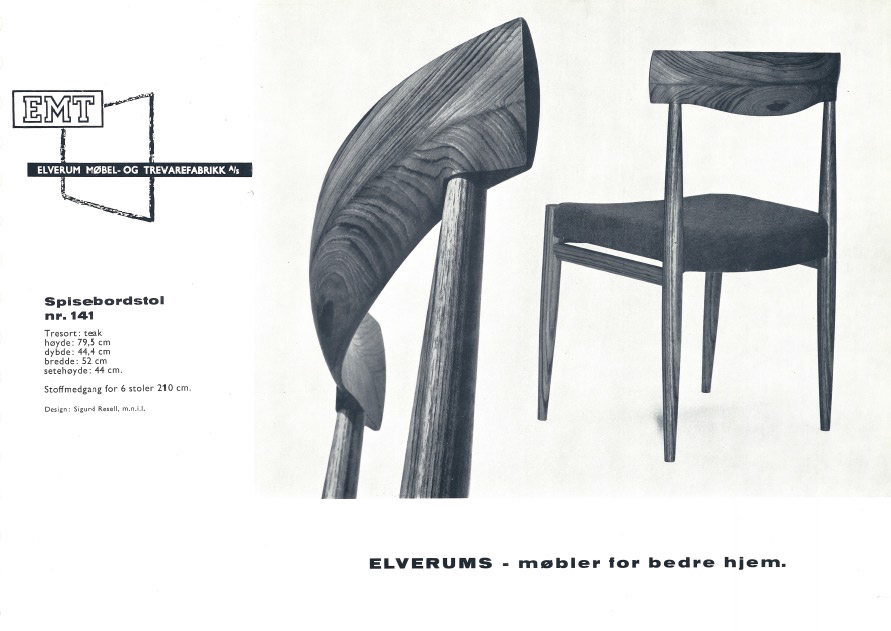
Sigurd Resell's chair

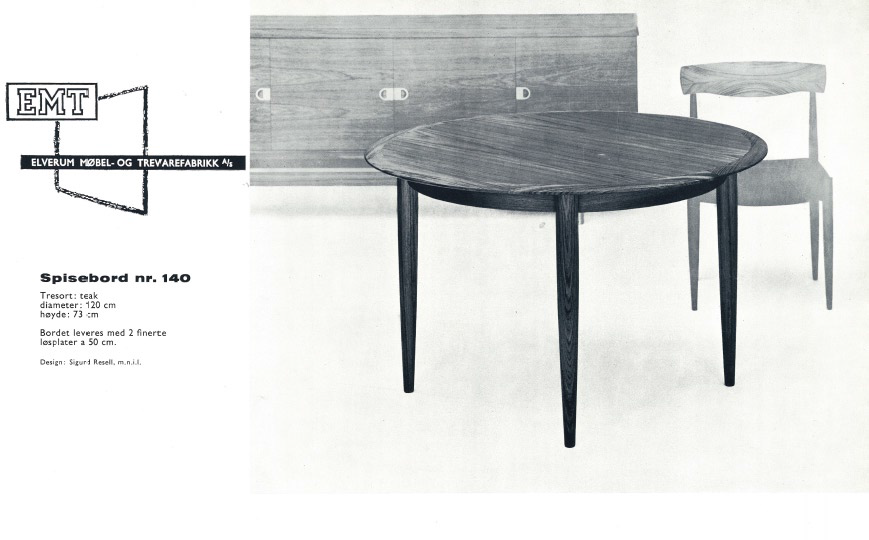
Sigurd Resell's table

== The ‘Compresin’ Technique ==
In the early 1950s a new technology called compresin was available for furniture manufacturers. The technique consisted of making sheets of wood by pressing glued wood veneer together under extremely high pressure. This technique was the predecessor to the more famous respatex board making.

Elverum Mobel & Trevarefabrikk were quick to adopt the technique and engaged Arne Jon Jutrem, a modern art glass artist working for Hadeland Glassverk, to create decorative table surfaces. He made at least three different artworks to be used as table top decorations which are now regarded as outstanding and important pieces of Norwegian mid century decorative design and highly sought after works of modern art.

Elverum Mobel & Trevarefabrikk's products made with the compresin technique didn't became a commercially viable product and they ended production not long after hitting the market.

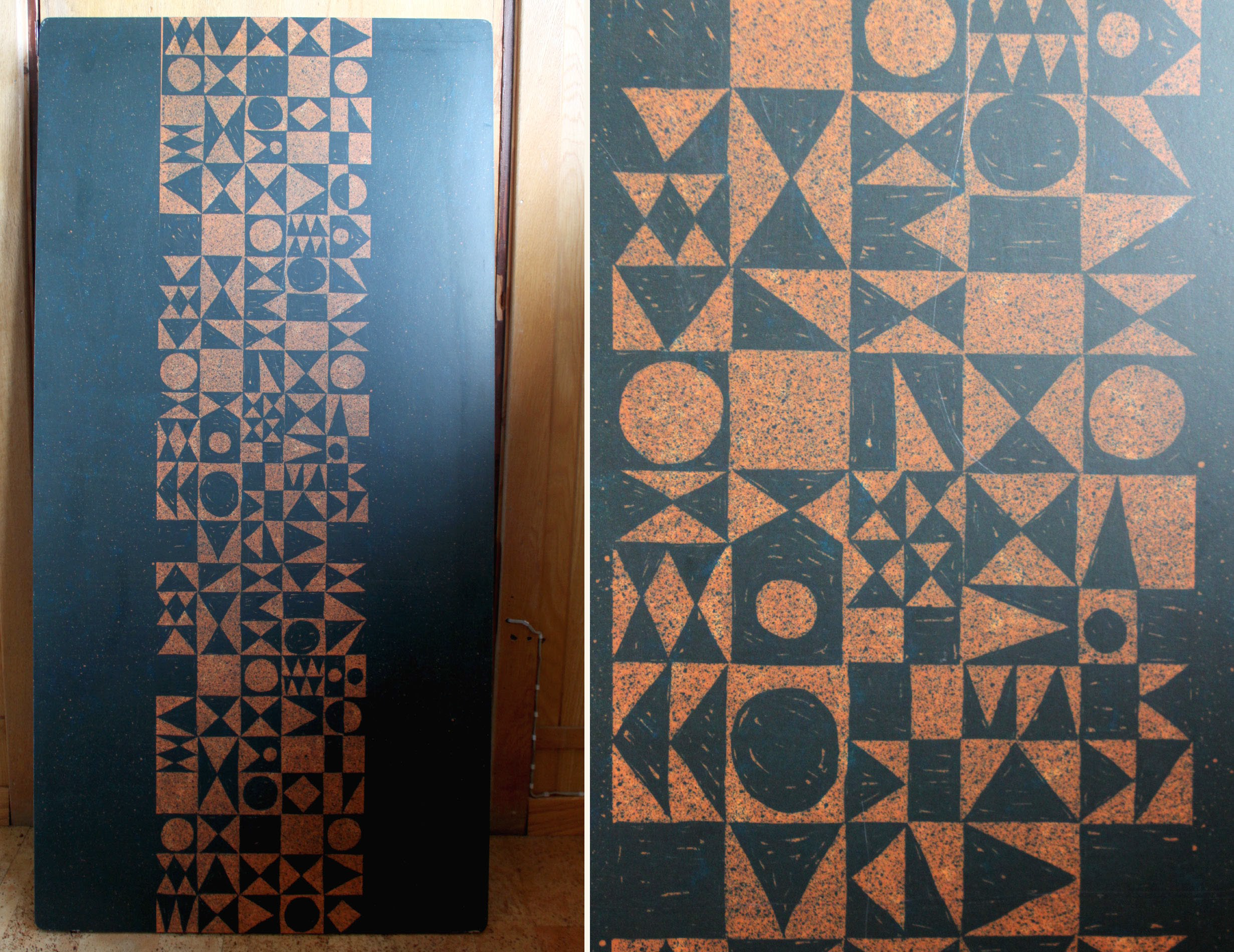
Modernist surface decoration by Arne jon Jutrem for EMT table top

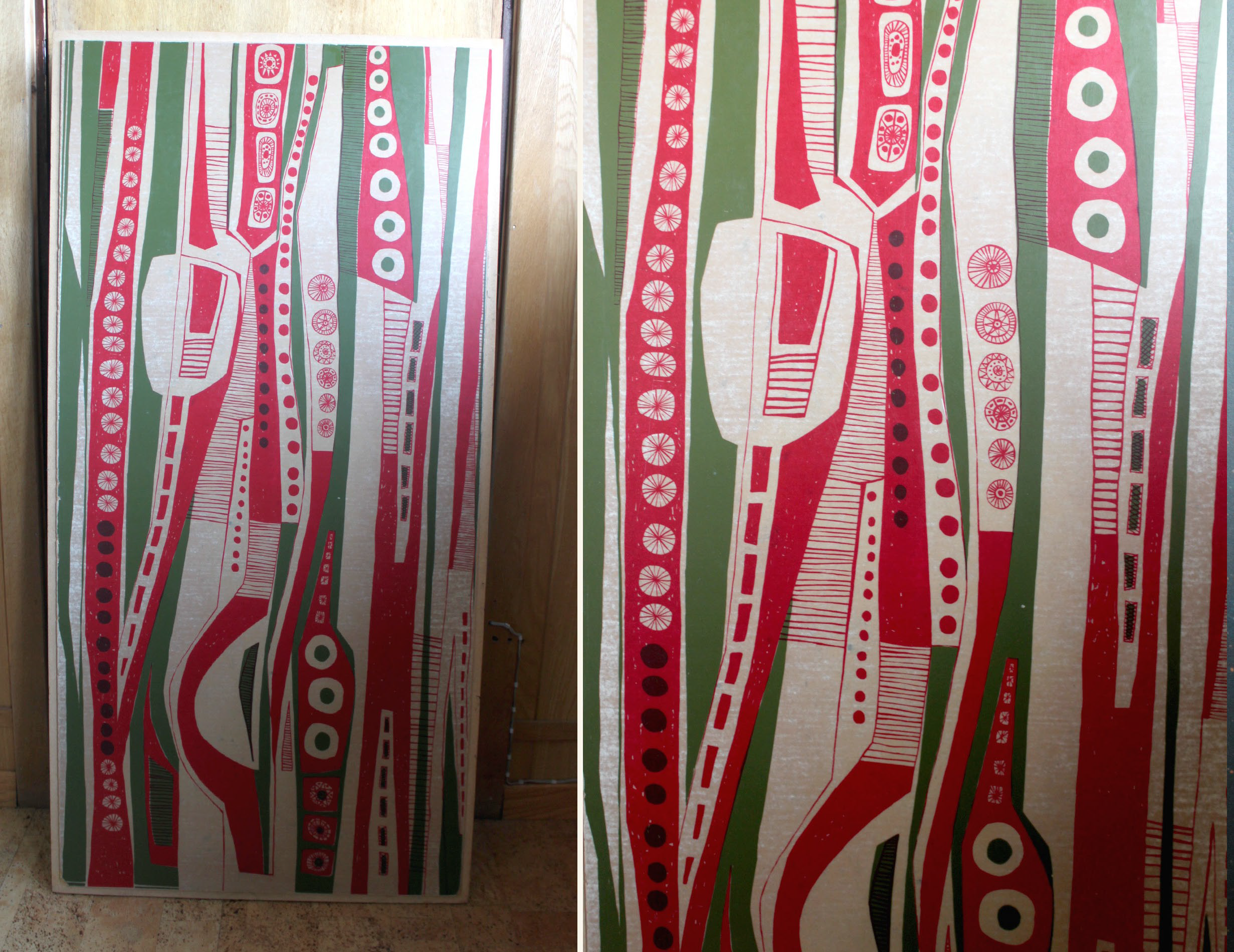
Modernist surface decoration by Arne jon Jutrem for EMT table top

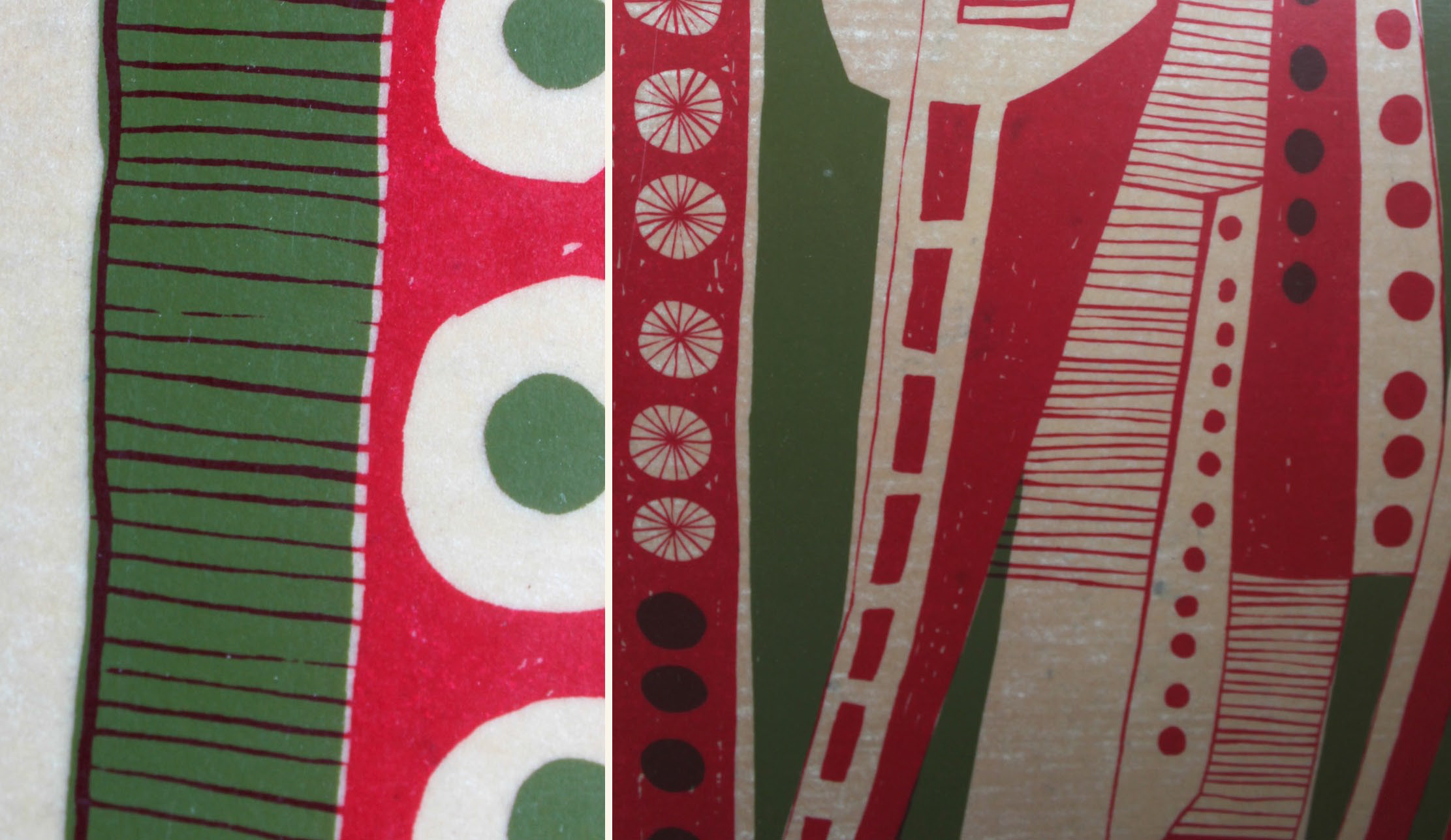
Modernist surface decoration by Arne jon Jutrem for EMT table top

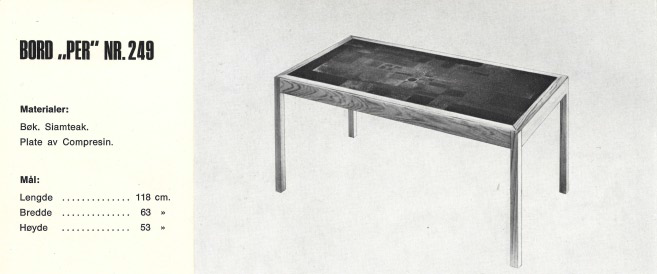
The 'Per' table with top surface decoration by Arne Jon Jutrem

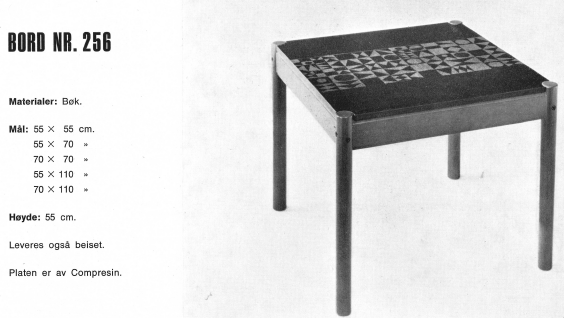
Table '256' by Olav Haug and surface decoration by Arne Jon Jutrem

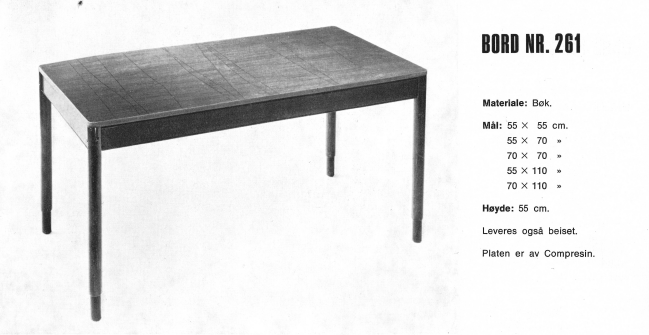
Table '261' by Olav Haug and surface decoration by Arne Jon Jutrem

Haug went to become a sales manager for Elverum Mobel & Trevarefabrikk and head of development and design. By that time he bore the responsibility for the entire factory. As sales manager, Haug attended every sales exhibition at the furniture fares in Denmark, Germany and Norway. Working actively to drive sales through as many channels as he could to secure employment for his colleagues, he worked closely with his friend Adolf Relling, a partner in the design firm Rastad & Relling, to offer the Bastian chair to large assembly halls and public institutions with great success. Buyers were the Norwegian Student Union, Nannestad Municipality, Oslo Municipality (city Architect Office), and Oslo Cathedral Nursing home amongst others.

Elverum Mobel & Trevarefabrikk was one of the few companies licensed to produce the famous ‘String’ shelves system designed by Swedish designer Nils Strinning. The string shelves were mostly produced for the Norwegian market.

In 1970 after 28 years working for Elverum Mobel & Trevarefabrikk as a designer and later a sales manager, Haug left to start his own furniture factory with three former employees. By that time the Norwegian furniture production business was undergoing a rapid transformation. Material and labor costs had pushed up production and sales prices and the new found wealth of Norwegian buyers meant that many households bought as much imported goods as they bought ‘made in Norway’, a substantial change from only 15 years earlier.

With his own factory Olav Haug Mobelfabrikk AS, Haug experienced success with the 'Odin' chair, made primarily for public environments. Haug also recognised that custom furniture design and production for public institutions was an unexplored opportunity. He won business in fitting the offices at the department of telecommunications, the Navy, the Norwegian Air Force, Oslo Municipality, and the University of Oslo on top of other smaller projects for hotels and new buildings.

Haug worked as a manager at Olav Haug Mobelfabrikk AS until his death in 1985. The company was sold in 1987 and continued producing Haug’s furniture under the new name Odin Mobler AS.
