= Richard M. Sims Jr. =

American judge

Richard Maury Sims Jr. (September 20, 1910 – November 19, 1985) was an American judge who was Associate Justice of the California First District Court of Appeal, Division One from 1940 to 1978 and the District Attorney of Marin County from 1950 to 1953.

Born in Berkeley, California, Sims attended Stanford University, where he received his bachelor's degree and was a member of Phi Beta Kappa society. He went on to obtain his law degree from Harvard Law School.

After law school, Sims joined the law firm of Knight, Boland & Reardon in San Francisco. He left the firm to enter the United States Navy during World War II. After leaving the navy as a lieutenant commander, Sims moved to Marin County, where he became Assistant County Counsel and eventually became County Counsel.

Sims was elected District Attorney of Marin County in 1950. He left that post in 1953 having been elected a Judge of the Marin Municipal Court in 1952. He occupied that office until he was appointed a Judge of the Marin County Superior Court in 1960 by Governor Pat Brown. In 1964, Brown appointed Sims as an Associate Justice of the California First District Court of Appeal, Division One, a position he held until 1978.

He died on 19 November 1985 of a heart attack while hiking near his home in Ross.

His son, Richard M. Sims III, was appointed to the Placer County Superior Court in 1980 and to the Third District Court of Appeal in 1982, receiving both appointments from Governor Jerry Brown (whose father was Pat Brown, the governor who had appointed the elder Sims to the Marin County Superior Court and to the First District Court of Appeal).
