= José L. Duomarco =

Uruguayan scientist

- Born: September 27, 1905; Montevideo, Uruguay
- Died: November 25, 1985 (aged 80); Montevideo
- Occupation: scientist

José L. Duomarco (September 27, 1905 – November 25, 1985) was a Uruguayan 20th century scientist who introduced innovative ideas in the fields of medical physics and cardiac and venous physiology.

== Life ==
Duomarco was born September 27, 1905, and died November 25, 1985, in Montevideo, Uruguay. He was the son of Uruguayan parents of Spanish origin.

He received his primary and secondary education from public institutions of Montevideo and his medical education from the School of Medicine of the Universidad de la República (Uruguay), from April 1924 to December 1930.

His investigations took place in the laboratories of that same School of Medicine, and also in Montevideo public hospitals.

His research work (his hobby) ran parallel to his medical practice as a heart specialist in Varela Fuentes and Rubino Private Clinic and in public hospitals. He was as attentive to his patients as he was to his experiments.

During his lifetime, Duomarco was a member and sometime president or vice president of the following Scientific Societies:

1. Sociedad Uruguaya de Cardiologia,
2. Sociedad de Biología de Montevideo and
3. Asociación Uruguaya Para el Progreso de la Ciencia.

During the 1947–1948 academic year and after being awarded a Guggenheim Fellowship, he worked under Professor Carl Wiggers at the Department of Physiology of the School of Medicine of Western Reserve University in Cleveland, Ohio.

On October 25, 1948, Professor Wiggers wrote:

"As I look back to last year, I realize again and again how much we appreciated having you with us. Your stimulating ideas proved very valuable even if I did not always agree with you fully. However, if we all agreed it would be very unfortunate for experimental science, for there would not then be anything for us to do."

On June 15, 1970, the Universidad de la Republica, through its School of Medicine, granted Duomarco the title of Professor ad-Honorem.

== Work ==
=== Books ===
Duomarco seconded by his friend Ricardo Rimini published two books:

1. La presión intraabdominal en el hombre en condiciones normales y patológicas. ('Intra-abdominal pressure in man in normal and pathological conditions'); Buenos Aires: El Ateneo; 1947.

Bernardo A. Houssay, an Argentinian professor and the 1947 "Physiology or Medicine" division Nobel Laureate, prefaced this book. Houssay wrote:

"No han faltado observadores y experimentadores que han emprendido este estudio en diferentes épocas, pero los doctores Duomarco y Rimini han realizado una obra más importante que sus predecesores porque han llevado a cabo una investigación más amplia y más completa que se apoya en hechos de observación y además discuten las aportaciones y las hipótesis de los autores precedentes. (...)
Esta obra es un esfuerzo metódico, razonado, paciente y perseverante, que merece el mayor elogio por la manera cómo se ha llevado a cabo y por la importancia del problema. Ha de dar lugar seguramente a nuevos estudios y a discusiones que harán progresar nuestros conocimientos."

(It is certain that along different times, observers and researchers have questioned themselves on the problem of abdominal pressure, but Doctors Duomarco and Rimini have worked out, by far, a broader and more complete study of the subject than that of their predecessors. They have based their results on factual observations besides discussing the hypothesis and contributions of the other authors. (...) This monograph is the consequence of methodic, intelligent, steadfast and perseverant work and deserves utmost praise for its accomplishment and for the importance of the subject, it analyzes. This book will surely be the basis for new studies and discussions that will lead to new advancements of science.)

2. La presión venosa central y periférica en condiciones normales y patológicas. ('Central and peripheral venous pressure in normal and pathological conditions'); Buenos Aires: López Libreros Editores SRL; 1964.

Blas Moia, a distinguished Argentinian cardiology professor, prefaced this second book.

"Los autores de este libro excepcional han dedicado buena parte de su vida médica al estudio de la circulación y de la presión venosa. El concepto de que las venas no se comportan como tubos rígidos sino como tubos eminentemente depresibles, que sufren el proceso del colapso en diferentes lugares, de acuerdo con las condiciones locales y con la posición del cuerpo, aunque entrevisto por LOWER en 1669 y estudiado por HOLT en 1941 necesitaba ser categóricamente demostrado para imponerse de manera definitiva. (...)
En síntesis, esta obra es una contribución ejemplar al conocimiento racional de la fisiología y fisiopatología de la presión venosa, sin el cual sería imposible interpretar adecuadamente los hallazgos semiológicos en el ser humano normal y enfermo. Por eso sus conclusiones son de aplicación eminentemente clínica y permitirán al médico valorar acertadamente los hallazgos realizados a la cabecera del enfermo, muchas veces aun sin el empleo de instrumento alguno."

(The authors of this exceptional book have dedicated a significant part of their medical life to the study of circulation and of venous pressure. The notion that veins do not behave as rigid tubes but as eminently collapsible tubes suffering from the process of collapse in different situations depending on local conditions and on the position of the body, although perceived by LOWER in 1669 and studied by HOLT in 1941, needed to be categorically demonstrated so that it could establish itself definitely. (...) Conclusively, this book is an outstanding contribution to the rational knowledge of venous pressure physiology and physiopathology and an indispensable contribution to an adequate understanding of semiological findings in normal and sick humans. For this reason, its conclusions are of eminent clinical application and they will allow the physician a correct evaluation of his findings, many times, even without making use of any specific instruments.)

=== Papers ===
Duomarco, when a very young medical student and enthusiastic on recent insulin studies, published in 1928 his first paper: “Sobre fisiopatología de la diabetes” (On Physiopathology of Diabetes) in “El estudiante libre” a medical students magazine. Seventy years later, the Uruguayan Post commemorated this event with the emission of a stamp honoring him.

When already a renowned investigator, enthusiastic on space travel, Duomarco published in 1970 his last paper: “Venous Pressure of Man in Space” in the Journal of Aerospace Medicine.

Duomarco published around one hundred and thirty papers. Some of those papers can be found here and here. Ricardo Rimini, Cyro Giambruno, Pablo Recarte, Arnoldo Esponda, Galina Solovey, José Pedro Sapriza, J. P. Migliaro, Germán H. Surraco, Ing. José Luis Duomarco (h) and others were some of his research collaborators.

According to the Science Citation Index, many of these papers are still being referenced in modern physiological research publications. Among those papers, Duomarco considered the following twelve as the most valuable:

- Comparison of cardiac output by a direct method and the Hamilton-Remington procedure. J.L. Duomarco; W.H. Dillon; C.J. Wiggers; The Am. J. of Physiology, 1948, CLIV, 290.
- The effect of the rapid infusion of liquid into the circulatory system J.L. Duomarco; C.E. Giambruno Acta Physiologica Latino Americana, 1951, I, 252.
- Intra esophageal pressure and the local differences in pleural pressure. J.L. Duomarco; R. Rimini; J.P. Migliaro; Acta Physiologica Latino Americana, 1954, IV 133.-
- Energy and hydraulic gradients along systemic veins J.l. Duomarco R. Rimini The American Journal of Physiology Vol 178. No. 2 August 1954.
- The collapse of the pulmonary veins. J.L. Duomarco; R. Rimini; C.E. Giambruno; Acta Physiologica Latino Americana, 1957, VII, p. 8.-
- On the relationship between end systolic volume and ventricular mechanical impulse, A new law of the heart. J.L. Duomarco A.C. Esponda Acta Physiologica Latino Americana, 1958, VIII, p. 164.
- Gradients of pressure in the circulatory system. J.L. Duomarco; R. Rimini; “Cardiology” An Encyclopedia of the Cardiovascular System. Ed. A.A. Luisada, McGraw Hill, New York, 1959.
- Functions for the Pericardium. J.L. Duomarco; C.E. Giambruno; R. Rimini; Cardiovascular Functions Ed. A. A. Luisada McGraw Hill, New York, 1962, p. 2-307.
- Systemic Venous Collapse in Man. J.L. Duomarco; R. Rimini; C.E. Giambruno; The Am. J. of Cardiology, 1963, XI, p. 357.
- Cardiac retropulsion and zonal pressure of the pericardium. J.L. Duomarco; R. Rimini C.E. Giambruno Acta Physiologica Latino Americana 1964, XIV, p. 55.
- La frecuencia cardíaca. Estudio sobre un modelo hidráulico. J.L. Duomarco; J.L. Duomarco(h); “Medicina” (Buenos Aires), 1966. XXVI, p. 1.
- Venous pressure of man in space. J.L. Duomarco; R. Rimini; Aerospace Medicine, Vol. 41 No. 2, February 1970.

=== Venous return regulation ===
One of Duomarco's favorite subjects of research was venous return regulation. On occasion of the VI Congreso de la Asociación Latinoamericana de Ciencias Fisiologicas (ALACF -- 1964) he wrote:

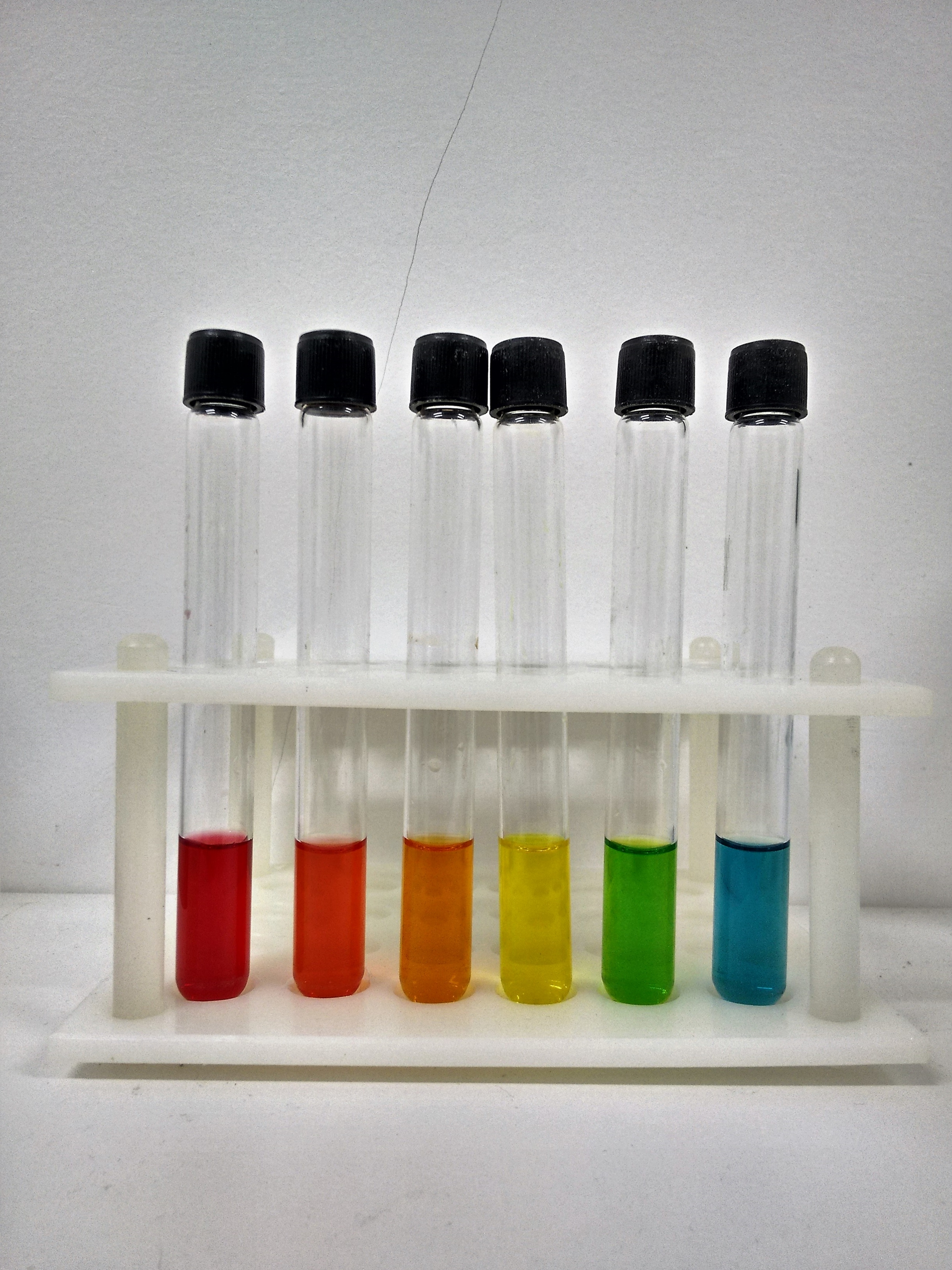
Tubos rígidos y colapsables.

"En la figura 1, el paisano (A) toma mate succionando por la bombilla, que es un tubo rígido; el bombero (B) puede arrojar ríos de agua por la manguera, que es un tubo colapsable; pero el ciudadano (C) no puede tomar ni una gota de su refresco, porque la pajuela se ha humedecido y se colapsa, en la porción próxima a la boca, al menor esfuerzo de succión. En sustancia: en un tubo rígido el líquido puede ser propulsado o aspirado, en un tubo colapsable, puede ser propulsado pero no aspirado.
La puerilidad de estas consideraciones, hace incomprensible que, durante más de un siglo (y por el impacto de los trabajos de Carson 1820; de Barry 1825; de Donders, 1815; sobre la hipopresión pleural) se haya supuesto que la aspiración torácica pudiera ser trasmitida, por vía retrógrada, a lo largo de tubos colapsables, como son las venas cavas..."

"In Figure 1, the man (A) drinks his mate sucking on a rigid tube; the fireman (B) sends rivers of water out of his hose, which is a collapsible tube; but the man in (C) cannot get a single drop of his soft drink out of the drinking straw, since it got wet and collapsed. In substance: A liquid can be either propulsed or aspirated out of a rigid tube, but can only be propulsed (and not aspirated) out of a collapsible tube.
The puerility of these considerations makes incomprehensible that, for more than one century (and because of the impact of the work of Carson in 1820, Barry in 1825, Donders in 1815, on pleural hipopressure) we have assumed that thoracic aspiration could be transmitted backwards along collapsible tubes, as are the cava veins..."

"La Regulación del Retorno Venoso". Conferencia por José L. Duomarco en la Mesa Redonda sobre “Mecanismos de Autorregulación Circulatoria” en el VI Congreso de la Asociación Latinoamericana de Ciencias Fisiológicas(ALACF) Viña del Mar, Chile Noviembre 1964

== Sources ==
- Mañé Garzón, Fernando; Mazzella, Héctor. (2000) Ed. Oficina del libro AEM. Historia de la Fisiología en el Uruguay. ISBN 9974-31-106-3
- West, John B. Editor. (1996) Chapter 8 by Peter T. Macklem. Oxford University Press for American Physiological Society. Respiratory Physiology. People and Ideas.
- Macklem, Peter T..(1998)American Journal of Respiratory and Critical Care Medicine. The Mechanics of Breathing. Am. J. Respir. Crit. Care Med., Volume 157, Number 4, April 1998, S88-S94.
- Mahler, Donald A., MD, Guest Editor. Vol. 10/Number 2 (1989). W.B. Saunders Company. Clinics in Chest Medicine.. p199-214
- Fenn, Wallace O.;Rahn, Hermann. Section Editors. (1964) American Physiological Society. Handbook of Physiology. Section 3: Respiration. Vol1. Chapter 13.
