= Josef Miller =

Josef Miller (22 April 1890 – 24 November 1985) was a German Jesuit theologian and superior who worked mainly in Austria.

== Life and work ==
Josef Miller was born in Lengmoos (Lower Bavaria); his parents were practicing Catholics and ran a bakery. For his grammar school studies he attended Scheyern Abbey; later he attended another Catholic school in Freising. In 1908, at the age of 18, before finishing school, he decided to enter the Jesuit Order. The order was still forbidden in Germany as a result of the Kulturkampf, so he entered the Austrian Jesuit Province instead. The novitiate (1908-1910) took place in St. Andrä in the Lavanttal; after that he finished his schooling (1910-1912) and graduated from Kalksburg College in Vienna. He studied philosophy in Innsbruck from 1912 to 1915. After that he worked as a prefect in the Kalksburg College (1915-1917). Four more years of theology studies followed in Innsbruck (1917-1921). He did military service as a medic in Munich (1917-1919). On 26 July 1920 he was ordained a priest in Innsbruck's Jesuit Church; in 1923 he received his doctorate from Innsbruck's Faculty of Theology.

He presided over the Jesuit students' sodality in Innsbruck from 1922 to 1936. He was known for his administrative skills and working well with people. He went on to serve as the Provincial of the Austrian Province of Jesuits. He had to master this task in the years from 1936 to 1942, much of the time during the Third Reich. Many religious houses and colleges were suppressed in this era. Several Jesuit Fathers were imprisoned or sent into exile. During the war, almost all the younger confreres were drafted into the Wehrmacht; some died in battle.

As of 1942, he served as spiritual director to Berchmans College, located in Pullach near Munich. Many of his students were former soldiers. Fr. Miller was popular with them because of his uncomplicated manner and sober style.

The last chapter of his life, starting in 1946, was devoted to teaching Moral Theology in Innsbruck. His Habilitation had been in pedagogy, and completed ten years prior (1936). Miller thus had to familiarize himself with much new material. He first taught as a lecturer in morals and finally received the appointment as a full professor of Moral Theology and pedagogy in 1955. In 1956/57 he was dean of the Faculty of Theology. He also presided over pastoral courses and continuing education for clergy for many years.

From 1967 to 1985, Miller served as a confessor in the Jesuit Church in Innsbruck. When his health no longer permitted him to do this, he moved to the sanatorium of the Sisters of the Cross in the Tirolean village of Rum. He died on the Solemnity of Christ the King. His funeral took place in Innsbruck's Jesuit Church, and he was buried in its crypt on 27 November 1985, with Bishop Reinhold Stecher presiding.

== Publications ==
- Zur Frage der geschlechtlichen Voraussetzung für den priesterlichen Zölibat. In: GIDei 1 (1946/47) 357-360.
- Die geistliche Krankenschwester vor Apostolatsaufgaben und Gewissensfragen. Hg.: Seelsorgeamt der Apostol. Administratur Innsbruck-Feldkirch. Innsbruck: Rauch 1950. - Neuaufl.: Am Krankenbett. Gewissensfragen und Apostolatsaufgaben. 2., neubearb. u. erw. Aufl. von „Die geistliche Krankenschwester vor Apostolatsaufgaben und Gewissensfragen“. Innsbruck: Rauch 1958. E. Foreitnik, Der Ehe Pflicht und Glück. Verlobten und Vermählten dargestellt. Neubearbeitung besorgt von J. Miller. Innsbruck: Rauch 1952.
- Die Einstellung des Menschen von heute zur Sünde. In: Anima 7 (1952) 4-8. Nachträgliche Krisen im Priester- und Ordensstand - männlich und weiblich -und deren Lösung. In: Anima 7 (1952) 250-257.
- Seelenführung und moderne medizinisch-chirurgische Ehefragen vom pasto-raltheologischen Standpunkt aus. In: Anima 7 (1952) 352-363.
- Seelenführung und Sexualprobleme. In: Anima 7 (1952) 317-329.
- Zum priesterlichen Berufsethos. In: ThPQ 100 (1952) 129-136.
- Trau, schau, wem! Du und die Parteien. Kevelaer: Butzon & Bercker 1953.
- Die Ängstlichkeit in der Seelsorge und ihre Heilung. In: Anima 8 (1953) 273-277.
- De usu et abusu matrimonii. Leitsätze und Hinweise für Beichtväter. Bearb. von J. Miller. Hg. von der österr. Bischofskonferenz. Innsbruck: Rauch 1954. - 3., durchges. Aufl. 1957.
- Moderne Eheprobleme in christlicher Sicht (Sehen - urteilen - handeln 4). Innsbruck: Tyrolia 1955. - 3., erw. Aufl. 1959.
- Zur Ignatianischen Gehorsamslehre. Ein Beitrag zum Ignatius-Jahr 1956. In: ThPQ 104 (1956) 193-213.
- Freundschaft zwischen Priester und Frau? In: Anima 12 (1957) 244-250.
- Der Papst über die Ehe. Eine Sammlung von päpstlichen Kundgebungen. Hg. von J. Miller (Sehen - urteilen - handeln 5). Innsbruck: Tyrolia 1958. - 2., erw. Aufl. 1959.
- Pastoral und Straßenunfälle. In: Anima 13 (1958) 225-232.
- Gewissensbildung (Sehen - urteilen - handeln 9). Innsbruck: Tyrolia 1960. -Engl.: Conscience Training. Translated from the German by J. J. Coyne. Dublin: Clonmore & Reynolds 1964.
- Mitwirkung bei unerlaubten ärztlichen Eingriffen und Anordnungen. In: Seels. 30 (1959/60) 482-492.
- Moral- und Pastoraltheologisches zur Pubertätsonanie. Zur Kritik des Onanie-Kapitels in dem Buche „Stille Revolution“ von Hans Wirtz. In: ThPQ 108 (1960) 31-41.
- Neubesinnung über das Bußsakrament ist notwendig. Zur Aufgabe eines Pasto-ralkurses über Beichtpraxis. In: ORPB 61 (1960) 193-196.
- Die Seelsorge der ungültig Getrauten und der Geschiedenen. In: Anima 16 (1961) 135-141.
- Lebensstandard - Lüge - Straßenverkehr. Christ im Alltag. Wien: Herold 1962. Moraltheologisches zu den *„Unfruchtbarkeitsdrogen“. In: ORPB 63 (1962) 213-219.
- Junge Männer - Väter - Staatsbürger. Christ im Alltag. Wien: Herold 1963. Das fünfte Gebot und der Straßenverkehr. Das Wort an die Gemeinde. Eine Predigt, die alle angeht. Überreicht vom Kuratorium für Verkehrssicherheit. Wien: Kuratorium für Verkehrssicherheit 1963.
- Katholik und Politik. In: Bote unserer lieben Frau. Dominikaner-Jahrbuch (Graz) 79 (1978) 4-10.

== Sources ==
- Volksbote 1955, Nr. 13, 8.
- Tiroler Nachrichten 1955, Nr. 65, 4.
- Tiroler Nachrichten 1960, Nr. 93, 4.
- Kirchenblatt für Tirol 1980, Nr. 26, 4.
- Kirche 1981, Nr. 20, 16.
- Österreichische Hochschulzeitung 1982, Nr. 5, 14.
- Tiroler Tageszeitung 1982, Nr. 43, 3.
- Kirche 1982, Nr. 10, 4.
- Kirche 1983, Nr. 26, 6-8.
- Tiroler Tageszeitung 1985, Nr. 274, 5.
- Kathpress 1985, Nr. 228, 5.
- Präsent 1985, Nr. 49, 7.
- Kirche 1985, Nr. 49, 3.
- Rundbrief österreichische Provinz SJ 1985, Nr. 5, 13-15.
