= Thomas Gow Brown =

- Born: 9 February 1902 Corstorphine, Scotland
- Died: 17 November 1985 (aged 83) Shotts, Lanarkshire, Scotland
- University: University of Edinburgh
- Occupation: Bacteriologist

Rugby union career
- Position: Three-quarter
International career
Years	Team	Apps	(Points)
1929	Scotland	1	(0)

Thomas Gow Brown (9 February 1902 — 17 November 1985) was a Scottish international rugby union player.

Born in Corstorphine, Edinburgh, Gow Brown played his club rugby for Heriot's FP, where he was originally a half-back before playing more as a three-quarter. He represented Edinburgh District and was capped once for Scotland, used on a wing opposite Jack Morley against Wales at Swansea in 1929.

Gow Brown graduated with a degree in medicine and surgery from the University of Edinburgh in 1927. He became a bacteriologist and was member of the Royal College of Physicians.

== See also ==
- List of Scotland national rugby union players
