= Ernest Weiss (sailor) =

Canadian sailor

Ernest Jerome Weiss (9 October 1926 – 5 November 1985) was a Canadian sailor who competed in the 1968 Summer Olympics. He was born in Toronto.
