= Henk van der Linden (footballer) =

Dutch footballer (1918–1985)

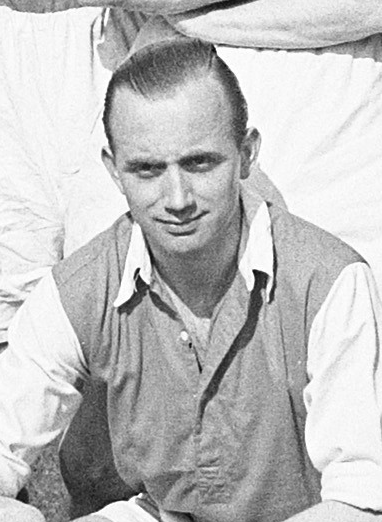
- Van der Linden in 1947

Personal information
- Full name: Hendrik van der Linden
- Date of birth: 7 December 1918
- Place of birth: Amsterdam, Netherlands
- Date of death: 9 November 1985 (aged 66)
- Place of death: Haarlem, Netherlands
- Position: Defender

Senior career*
| Years | Team | Apps | (Gls) |
| 1939–1940 | Ajax | | |
| 1940–1945 | Be Quick 1887 | | |
| 1945–1948 | Ajax | | |
| 1948–1951 | HFC Haarlem | | |

International career
| 1946–1947 | Netherlands | 7 | (0) |
- * Club domestic league appearances and goals

Hendrik van der Linden (7 December 1918 – 9 November 1985) was a Dutch footballer who played as a defender. He made seven appearances for the Netherlands national team from 1946 to 1947.
