= List of guerrillas of Colombia =

The following is a list of notable people in Colombia who have belonged to a leftist guerrilla organization.

== 19th of April Movement members ==
- Jaime Bateman Cayón (1940–1983)
- Álvaro Fayad Delgado (1946–1986)
- Iván Marino Ospina (1940–1985)
- Vera Grabe Loewenherz (born 1951), former
- Antonio Navarro Wolff (born 1948), former
- Carlos Pizarro Leongómez (1951–1990)
- Carlos Toledo Plata (1932–1984)

== Revolutionary Armed Forces of Colombia members ==
- Alfonso Cano (1948–2011), FARC-EP
- Timoleón Jiménez (born 1959), FARC-EP
- Iván Márquez (born 1955), FARC-EP
- Manuel Marulanda (1930–2008), FARC-EP
- Mono Jojoy (1953–2010), FARC-EP
- Manuel Marulanda (1930–2008), FARC-EP
- Raúl Reyes (1948–2008), FARC-EP
- Elda Neyis Mosquera (born 1963), FARC-EP, former

== National Liberation Army members ==
- Antonio García (born 1956)
- Camilo Torres Restrepo (1929–1966)
- Fabio Vásquez Castaño (1940–2019)
