= 1985 =

1985 in various calendars
- Gregorian calendar: 1985; MCMLXXXV
- Ab urbe condita: 2738
- Armenian calendar: 1434; ԹՎ ՌՆԼԴ
- Assyrian calendar: 6735
- Baháʼí calendar: 141–142
- Balinese saka calendar: 1906–1907
- Bengali calendar: 1391–1392
- Berber calendar: 2935
- British Regnal year: 33 Eliz. 2 – 34 Eliz. 2
- Buddhist calendar: 2529
- Burmese calendar: 1347
- Byzantine calendar: 7493–7494
- Chinese calendar: 甲子年 (Wood Rat); 4682 or 4475 — to — 乙丑年 (Wood Ox); 4683 or 4476
- Coptic calendar: 1701–1702
- Discordian calendar: 3151
- Ethiopian calendar: 1977–1978
- Hebrew calendar: 5745–5746
- Hindu calendars
- Vikram Samvat: 2041–2042
- Shaka Samvat: 1906–1907
- Kali Yuga: 5085–5086
- Holocene calendar: 11985
- Igbo calendar: 985–986
- Iranian calendar: 1363–1364
- Islamic calendar: 1405–1406
- Japanese calendar: Shōwa 60 (昭和６０年)
- Javanese calendar: 1917–1918
- Juche calendar: 74
- Julian calendar: Gregorian minus 13 days
- Korean calendar: 4318
- Minguo calendar: ROC 74 民國74年
- Nanakshahi calendar: 517
- Thai solar calendar: 2528
- Tibetan calendar: ཤིང་ཕོ་བྱི་བ་ལོ་ (male Wood-Rat); 2111 or 1730 or 958 — to — ཤིང་མོ་གླང་ལོ་ (female Wood-Ox); 2112 or 1731 or 959
- Unix time: 473385600 – 504921599

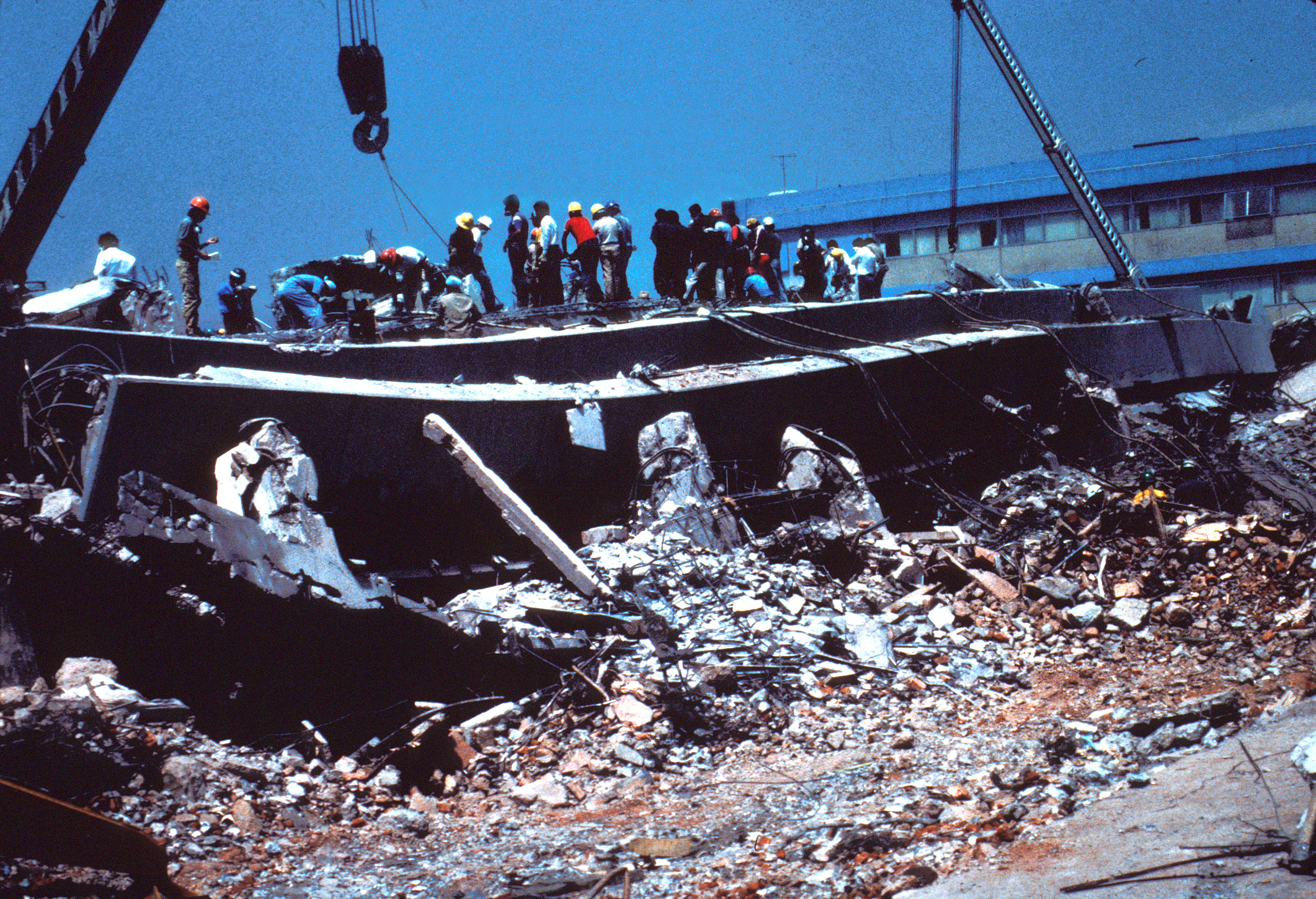
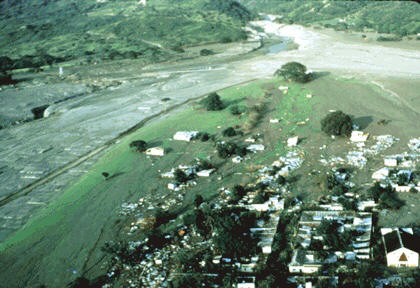
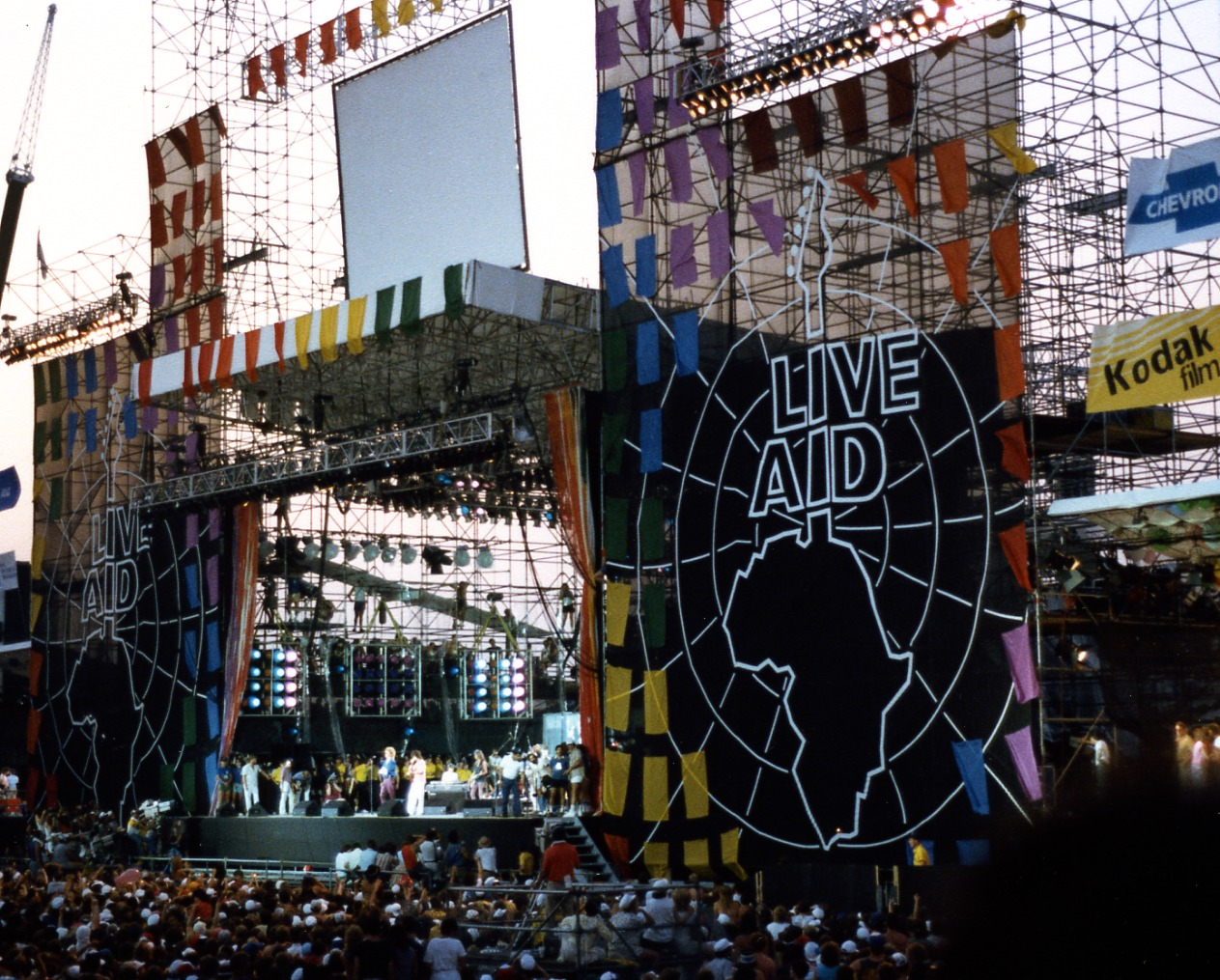
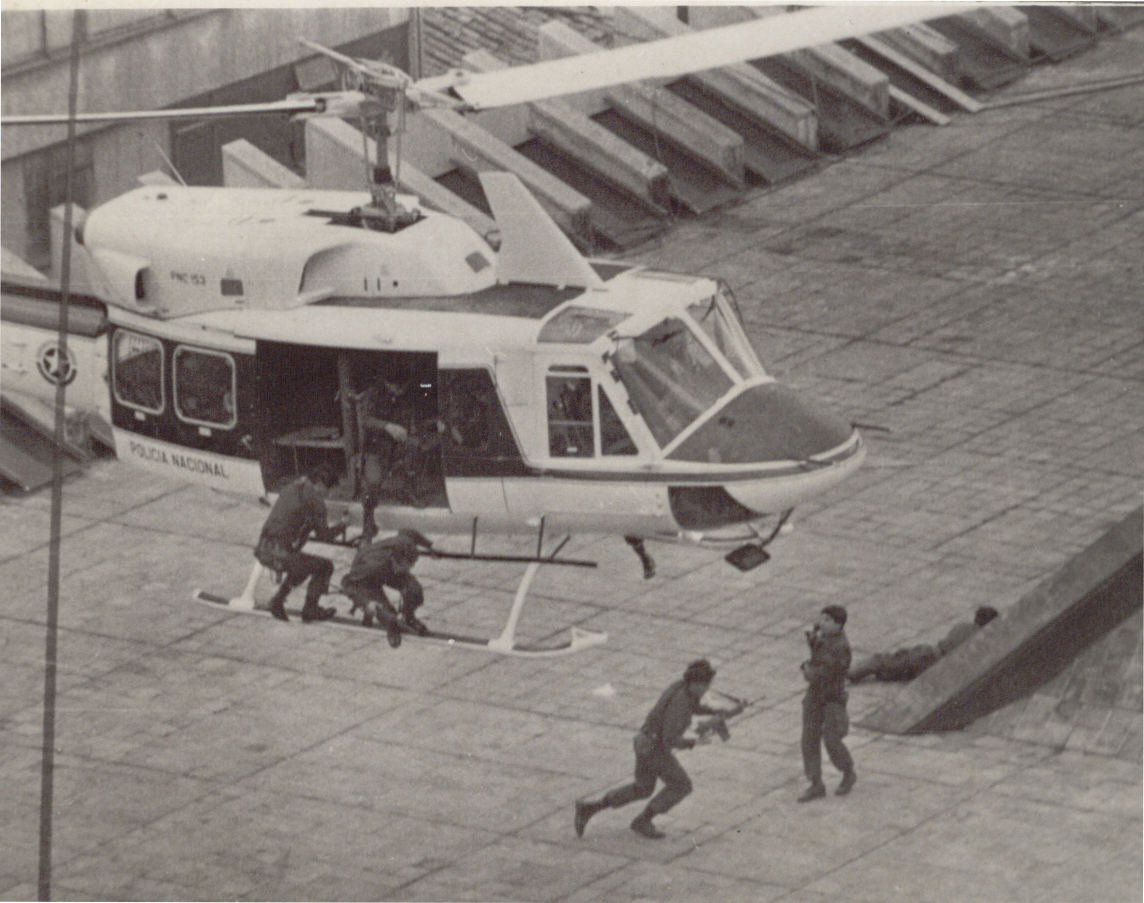
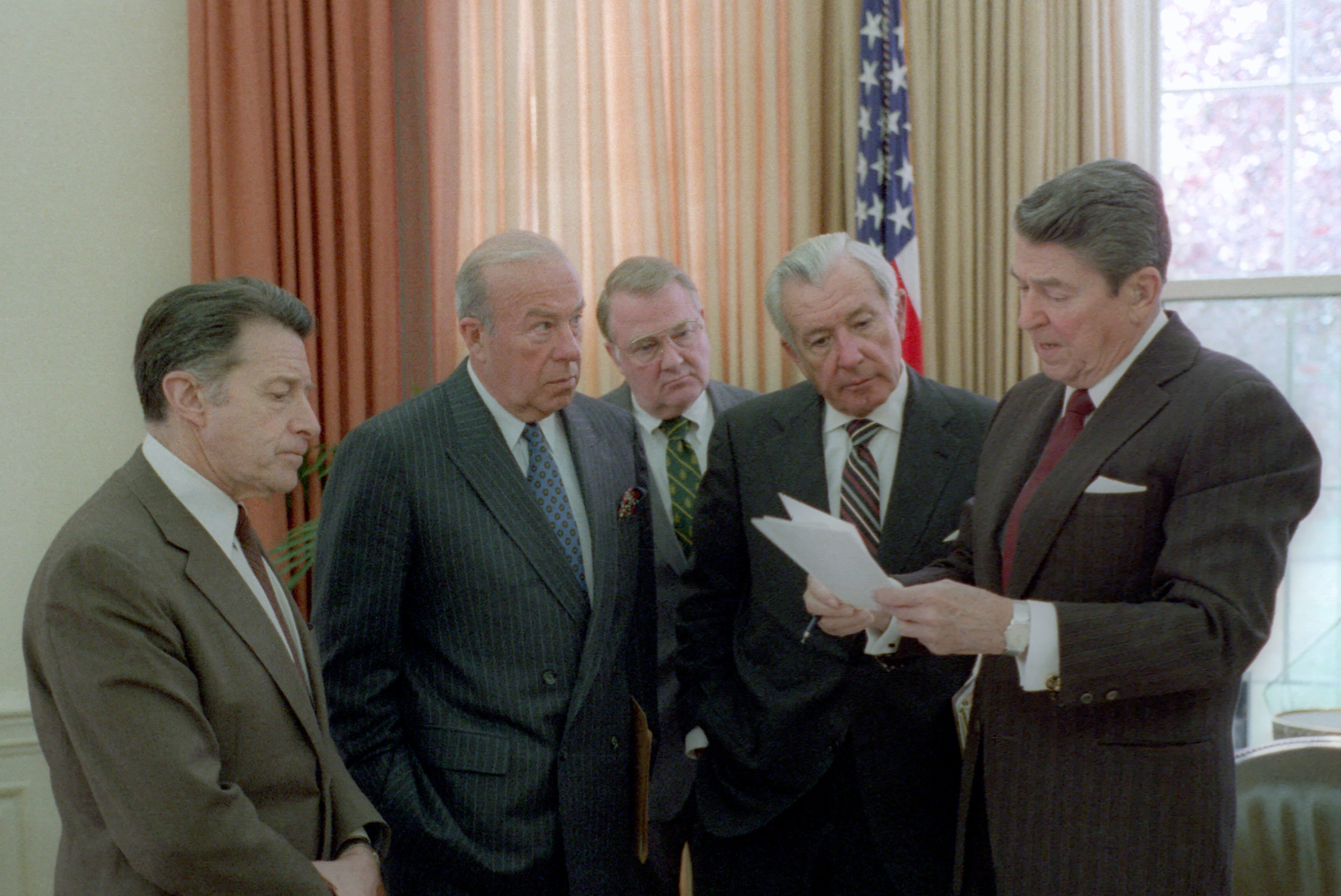
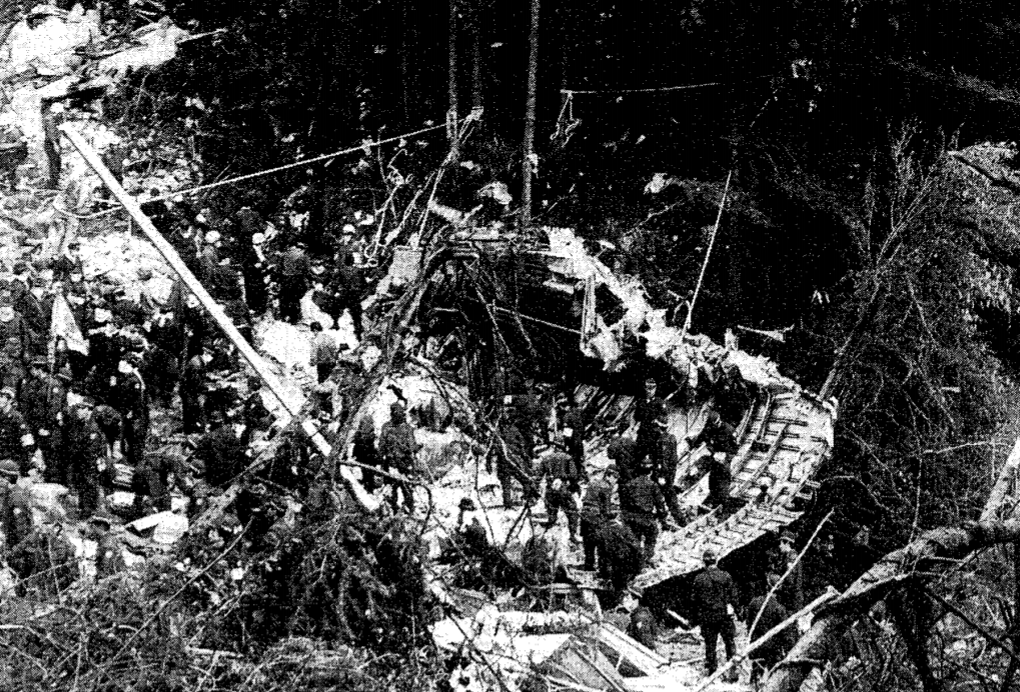
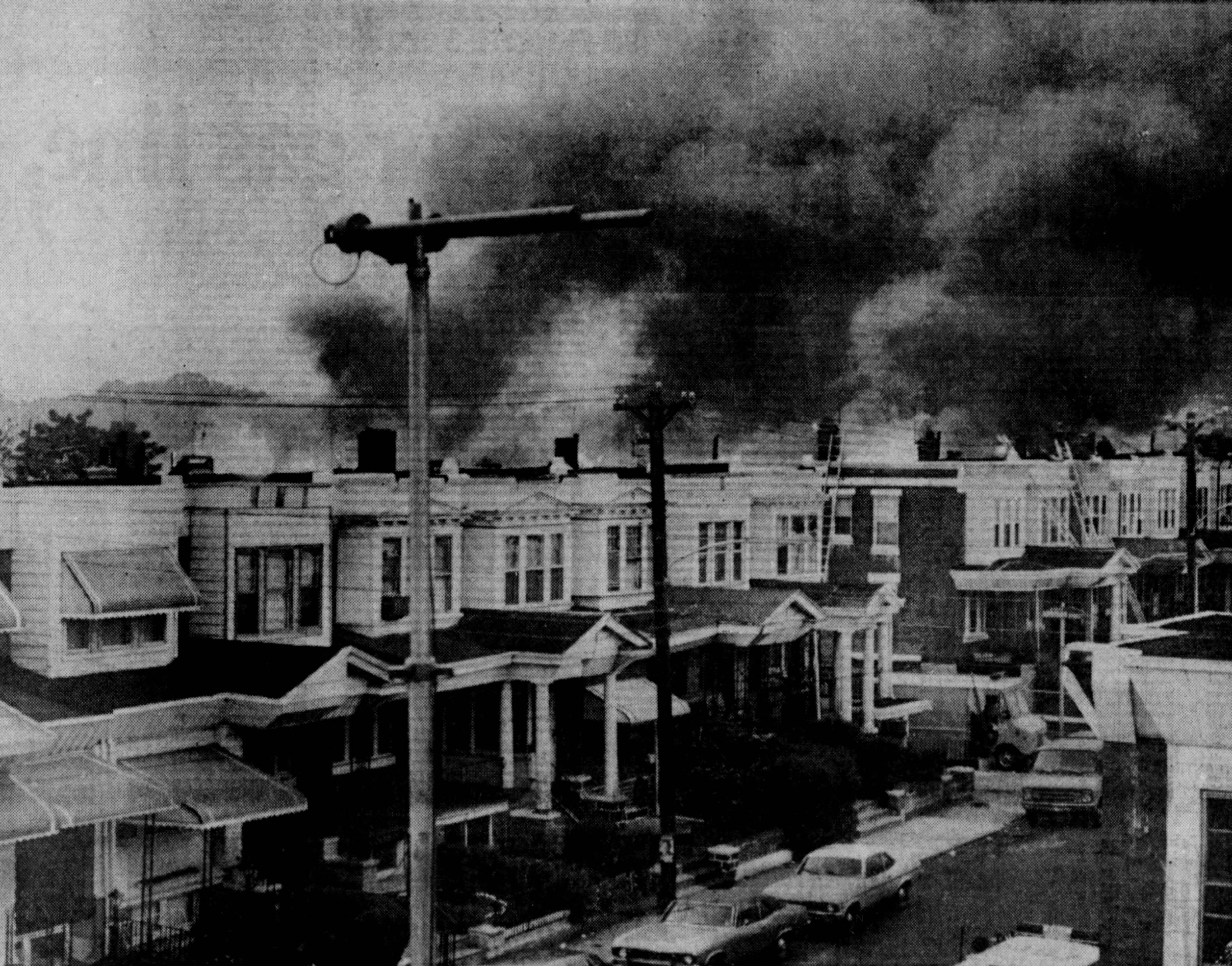
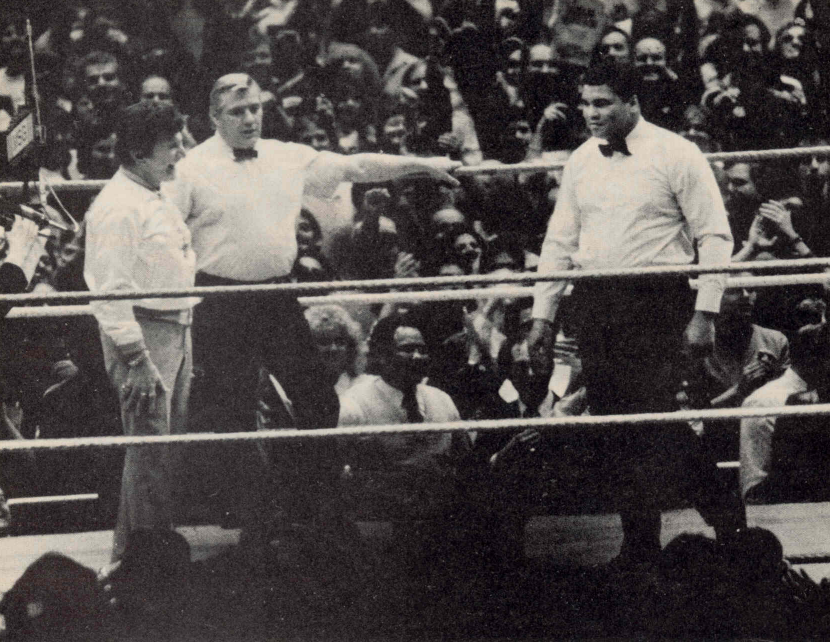
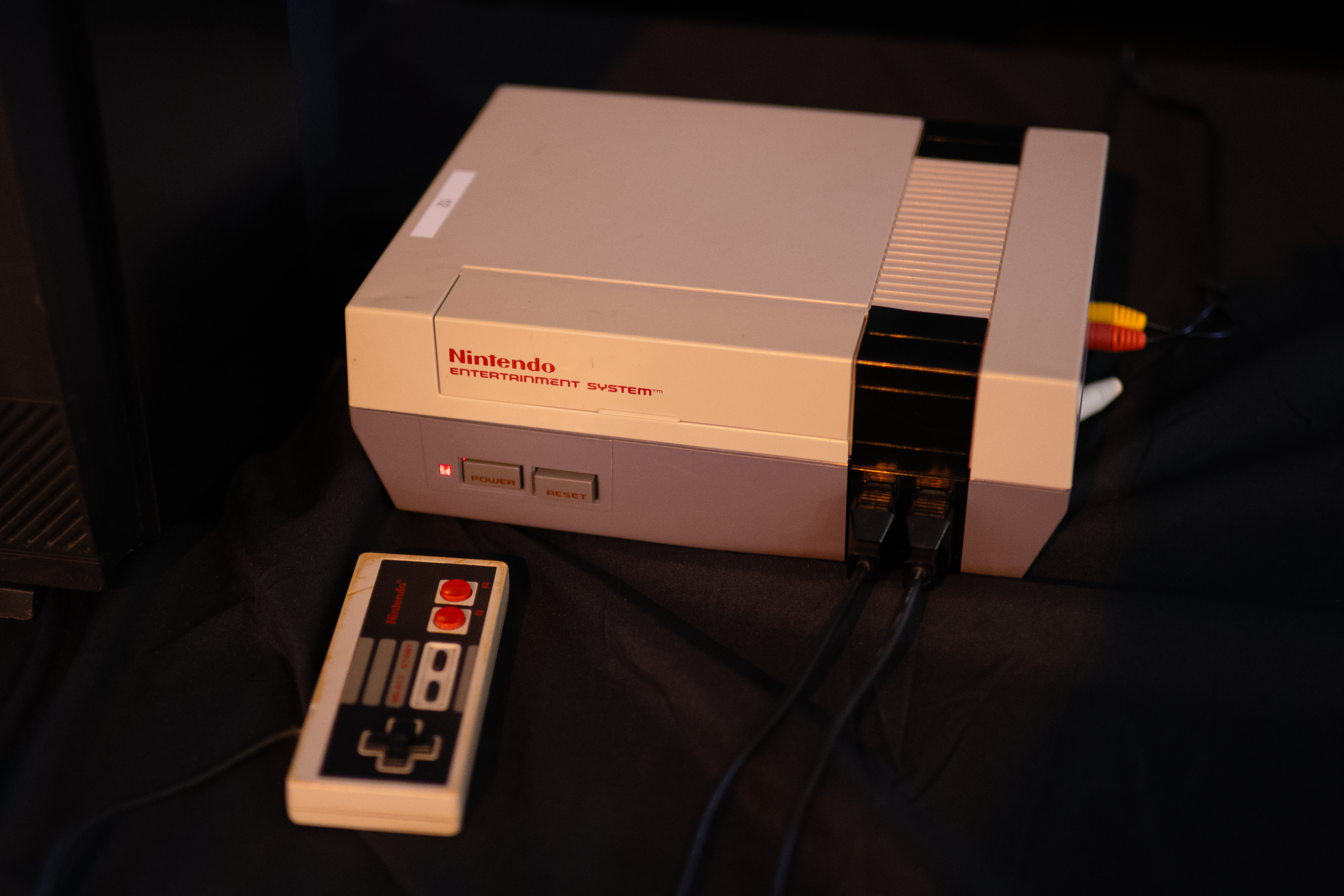
From top to bottom, left to right: the 1985 Mexico City earthquake devastates Mexico City, killing an estimated 45,000 people; the Armero tragedy kills over 23,000 people after the eruption of Nevado del Ruiz in Colombia; the Live Aid concerts raise millions for famine relief in Ethiopia; the Palace of Justice siege leaves over 100 people dead in Bogotá, Colombia; the Iran–Contra affair reveals secret U.S. arms sales to Iran and the Contras; Japan Air Lines Flight 123 crashes, killing 520 people and becoming the deadliest single-airplane crash in history; the 1985 MOVE bombing kills 11 people in Philadelphia; the inaugural WrestleMania I launches the 1980s professional wrestling boom; and the Nintendo Entertainment System is released in North America, revitalizing the video game industry.

1985 (MCMLXXXV) was a common year starting on Tuesday of the Gregorian calendar, the 1985th year of the Common Era (CE) and Anno Domini (AD) designations, the 985th year of the 2nd millennium, the 85th year of the 20th century, and the 6th year of the 1980s decade.

The year 1985 was designated as the International Youth Year by the United Nations.

== Events ==
=== January ===
- January 1
  - The Internet's Domain Name System is created.
  - Greenland withdraws from the European Economic Community as a result of a new agreement on fishing rights.
- January 7 – Japan Aerospace Exploration Agency launches Sakigake, Japan's first interplanetary spacecraft and the first deep space probe to be launched by any country other than the United States or the Soviet Union.
- January 15 – Tancredo Neves is elected president of Brazil by the Congress, ending the 21-year military rule.
- January 27 – The Economic Cooperation Organization (ECO) is formed, in Tehran.
- January 28 – The charity single record "We Are the World" is recorded by USA for Africa.

=== February ===
- February 4 – The border between Gibraltar and Spain reopens for the first time since Francisco Franco closed it in 1969.
- February 5 – Australia cancels its involvement in U.S.-led MX missile tests.
- February 9 – U.S. drug agent Kiki Camarena is kidnapped and murdered in Mexico by drug traffickers; his body is later discovered on March 5.
- February 14 – Lebanon hostage crisis: CNN reporter Jeremy Levin is freed from captivity in Lebanon.
- February 16
  - Israel begins withdrawing troops from Lebanon.
  - The ideology of Hezbollah is declared in a program issued in Beirut.
- February 19
  - William J. Schroeder becomes the first patient with an artificial heart to leave the hospital.
  - Iberia Airlines Flight 610 crashes, killing all 148 on board.
  - China Airlines Flight 006 is involved in a mid-air incident; while there are 22 minor injuries and 2 serious injuries, no one is killed.
- February 25 – Tears for Fears release their second studio album, Songs from the Big Chair, which includes the hit singles "Shout" and "Everybody Wants to Rule the World."
- February 28 – The Provisional Irish Republican Army carries out a mortar attack on the Royal Ulster Constabulary police station at Newry in Northern Ireland. With nine officers dead, it is the highest loss of life for the RUC on a single day.

=== March ===
- March – The GNU Manifesto, written by Richard Stallman, is first published.
- March 1 – After a 12-year-long dictatorship, Julio María Sanguinetti is sworn in as the first democratically elected President of Uruguay.
- March 3 – The 8.0 M_{w} Algarrobo earthquake hits Santiago and Valparaíso, Chile, leaving 177 dead, 2,575 injured, 142,489 houses destroyed, and approximately a million people homeless.
- March 6 – Greek Prime Minister Andreas Papandreou instigated a constitutional crisis to divert voter's attention from the deterioration of the Greek economy, by suddenly not supporting Konstantinos Karamanlis for a second term as President of Greece and violating constitutional voting protocol to get his presidential candidate to power. At the same time, he proposed a constitutional reforms to remove constitutional checks and balances constraining his position.
- March 8 – A Beirut car bomb, planted in an attempt to assassinate Islamic cleric Sayyed Mohammad Hussein Fadlallah, kills more than 80 people and injures 200 more.
- March 11
  - Mikhail Gorbachev becomes General Secretary of the Soviet Communist Party and de facto leader of the Soviet Union.
  - Mohamed Al-Fayed buys the London-based department store company Harrods.
- March 15 – Vice-president José Sarney, upon becoming vice president, assumes the duties of president of Brazil, as the new president Tancredo Neves had become severely ill the day before. Sarney would later become Brazil's first civilian president in 21 years, upon Neves' death on April 21.
- March 16 – Lebanon hostage crisis: US journalist Terry Anderson is taken hostage in Beirut; he remains a prisoner until December 4, 1991.
- March 17 – Expo '85, an international exhibition, opens in Tsukuba, Ibaraki, Japan, running until September 16.
- March 18 – Australia's longest-running soap opera, Neighbours, debuts on Seven Network.
- March 21 – Canadian paraplegic athlete and activist Rick Hansen sets out on his 26-month, 40,000-kilometre (25,000 mi) Man in Motion tour, which raises US$26 million for spinal cord research and quality-of-life initiatives.
- March 25
  - The 57th Academy Awards are held in Los Angeles, with Amadeus winning Best Picture.
  - The Organization Commune Africaine et Malgache is officially dissolved.
- March 29 - two Lockheed CC-130H Hercules of the RCAF collided mid-air above the Canadian Forces base in Edmonton killing 10 servicemen.
- March 31 – The inaugural WrestleMania is held in Madison Square Garden, New York, and is "main-evented" by Hulk Hogan and Mr. T vs. Paul Orndorff and Roddy Piper in a tag-team match.

=== April ===
- Soviet–Afghan War: The Soviet Union begins to transfer the burden of fighting the mujahideen to the armed forces of the Democratic Republic of Afghanistan, a cause of the Revolutions of 1989.
- April 1 – Telegraph and Telephone Public Corporation, and Japan Tobacco and Salt Public Corporation, are privatized and change their names to Nippon Telegraph and Telephone, and Japan Tobacco, respectively.
- April 12 – El Descanso bombing: A terrorist bombing attributed to the Islamic Jihad Organization in the El Descanso restaurant near Madrid, Spain, mostly attended by U.S. personnel from the Torrejón Air Base, causes 18 deaths (all Spaniards) and 82 injuries.
- April 15 – South Africa ends its ban on interracial marriages.
- April 19 – The Soviet Union performs a nuclear weapon test in eastern Kazakhstan.
- April 23 – Coca-Cola changes its formula and releases New Coke. The response is overwhelmingly negative and the original formula is back on the market in less than three months.
- April 28 – The Australian Nuclear Disarmament Party (NDP) splits.

=== May ===
- May 4 – The 30th Eurovision Song Contest takes place in Gothenburg, Sweden and is won by the Bobbysocks! song La det swinge for Norway.
- May 5 – U.S. President Ronald Reagan joins West German Chancellor Helmut Kohl for a controversial funeral service at a cemetery in Bitburg, West Germany, which includes the graves of 59 elite S.S. troops from World War II.
- May 9 – The 3rd total Victory Day Parade (the first being in 1945 and the next in 1965) is held on Red Square in Moscow in the Soviet Union. It features T-34-85 tanks, veterans of World War II from Poland, Czechoslovakia and the Soviet Union, and is the first parade to be held during the reign of Mikhail Gorbachev.
- May 11
  - The FBI brings charges against the suspected heads of the five Mafia families in New York City.
  - Bradford City stadium fire: A fire engulfs a wooden stand at the Valley Parade stadium in Bradford, England, during an Association football match, killing 56 people.
- May 13 – Philadelphia police drop bombs on a row home occupied MOVE during a gun battle between police and MOVE, killing six adults and five children
- May 15 – Argentine President Raúl Alfonsín terminates Argentine administration of the Falkland Islands but does not relinquish Argentina's claim to the islands.
- May 16 – Scientists of the British Antarctic Survey announce the discovery of the ozone hole.
- May 25 – Approximately 10,000 people are killed when Bangladesh is affected by the storm surge from Tropical Storm One (1B).
- May 26 – Young driver Danny Sullivan beats veteran Mario Andretti to win the 1985 Indianapolis 500.
- May 29 – Heysel Stadium disaster: Thirty-nine spectators are killed in rioting on the terraces during the European Cup final between Liverpool F.C. and Juventus (0–1) at Heysel Stadium in Brussels, Belgium.
- May 31 – Forty-four tornadoes hit Ohio, Pennsylvania, New York and Ontario, including a rare and powerful F5. In total, the event kills 90 people.

=== June ===
- June 6 – The remains of Josef Mengele, the physician notorious for Nazi human experimentation on inmates of Auschwitz concentration camp, buried in 1979 under the name of Wolfgang Gerhard, are exhumed in Embu das Artes, Brazil.
- June 14
  - TWA Flight 847, carrying 153 passengers from Athens to Rome, is hijacked by a Hezbollah fringe group. One passenger, U.S. Navy Petty Officer Robert Stethem, is killed. Greek police arrest a 65-year-old Lebanese suspect on September 21, 2019.
  - The Schengen Agreement is signed between certain member states of the European Economic Community, creating the Schengen Area, a bloc of (at the time) 5 states with no internal border controls.
- June 15 – Studio Ghibli, an animation studio, is founded in Tokyo.
- June 20 – 1985 Nepal bombings: A series of bomb blasts occurs in Kathmandu and other cities of Nepal.
- June 22 – British and Irish police foil a "mainland bombing campaign" sponsored by the Provisional Irish Republican Army which targets luxury vacation resorts.
- June 23 – Air India Flight 182, a Boeing 747, is blown up by a terrorist bomb 31,000 feet (9,500 m) above the Atlantic Ocean, south of Ireland, on a Montreal–London–Delhi flight, killing all 329 aboard.
- June 24 – STS-51-G: Space Shuttle Discovery completes its mission, best remembered for having Sultan bin Salman Al Saud, the first Arab and first Muslim in space, as a payload specialist.
- June 26 – The iconic U.S. Route 66 is officially decommissioned.

=== July ===
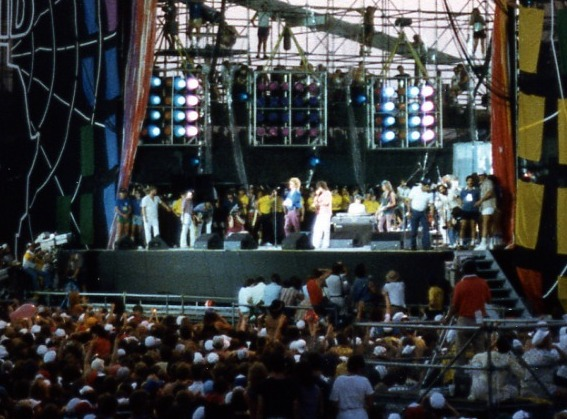
Live Aid at JFK Stadium in Philadelphia

- July 1 – The Convention on the Transfer of Sentenced Persons enters into force.
- July 10
  - The Greenpeace vessel Rainbow Warrior is bombed and sunk in Auckland Harbour by French DGSE agents.
  - Aeroflot Flight 5143 crashes near Uchquduq, Uzbek SSR, Soviet Union, killing all 200 people on board.
- July 13 – Live Aid benefit concerts in London and Philadelphia raise over £50 million for famine relief in Ethiopia.
- July 19
  - New Hampshire teacher Christa McAuliffe is selected as the first person to go into space under the Teacher in Space Project, and designated to ride aboard the Space Shuttle Challenger.
  - The Val di Stava dam collapses in Italy, killing 268 people, destroying 63 buildings, and demolishing eight bridges.
- July 20 – Apartheid: State President of South Africa, P. W. Botha, declares a state of emergency in 36 magisterial districts of South Africa amid growing civil unrest in black townships.

=== August ===
- August 2 – Delta Air Lines Flight 191 crashes near Dallas, Texas, United States, killing 137 people.
- August 12 – Japan Air Lines Flight 123 crashes in Japan, killing 520 people, including Japanese singer Kyu Sakamoto; it is the worst single-aircraft disaster in aviation history. There were only 4 survivors.
- August 14 – The Accomarca massacre takes place in Ayacucho, Peru.
- August 22 – British Airtours Flight 28M: The 737's left engine catches fire while on its takeoff roll at Manchester Airport in the UK and 55 people are killed while trying to evacuate the aircraft.
- August 25 – Bar Harbor Airlines Flight 1808 crashes in the United States, killing all 8 on board, including thirteen-year-old American celebrity schoolgirl Samantha Smith.

=== September ===
- September 1 – The wreck of the RMS Titanic is located by a joint American-French expedition led by Robert Ballard (WHOI) and Jean-Louis Michel (IFREMER) using side-scan sonar from RV Knorr.
- September 6 – Midwest Express Airlines Flight 105, a McDonnell Douglas DC-9, crashes just after takeoff from Milwaukee, killing all 31 on board.
- September 13 – Super Mario Bros by Nintendo, the start of the Mario series, officially comes out.
- September 19 – An 8.0 M_{w} earthquake strikes Mexico City, killing between 5,000 and 45,000 people and injuring 30,000 more.
- September 20 – The capital gains tax is introduced to Australia.
- September 22
  - The Plaza Accord is signed by five nations.
  - Artists Christo and Jeanne-Claude wrap the Pont Neuf, the oldest bridge in Paris, for two weeks (22 Sep. – 5 Oct. 1985). The Pont Neuf Wrapped attracts three million visitors.

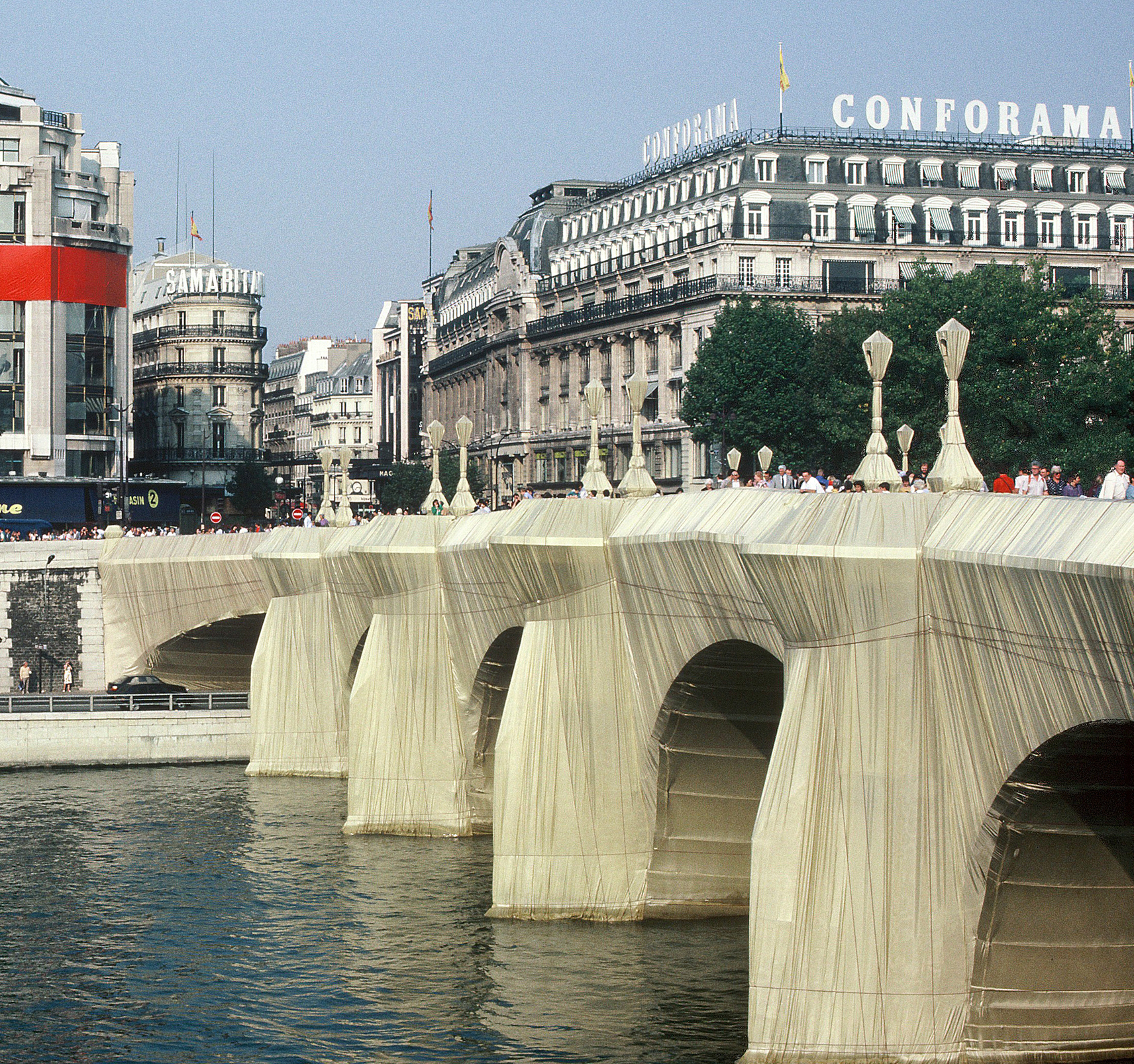
The Pont Neuf wrapped. Paris, 1985, Sep 22 - Oct 5

- September 23 – Italian crime reporter Giancarlo Siani is killed by the Camorra.

=== October ===
- October 1 – Operation Wooden Leg: The Israeli air force bombs Palestine Liberation Organization headquarters near Tunis.
- October 3 – The Space Shuttle Atlantis makes its maiden flight.
- October 7 – The cruise ship Achille Lauro is hijacked in the Mediterranean Sea by four heavily armed Palestinian terrorists. One passenger, American Leon Klinghoffer, is killed.
- October 16 – The Finnish dry cargo ship MS Hanna-Marjut, on its way from Mariehamn to Naantali, sinks in hard sea on the open water of Kihti between the Kökar and Sottunga islands of Åland, leading to the drowning of four people.
- October 18 – The Nintendo Entertainment System is released in North America, helping revitalize the home video game industry after the video game crash of 1983.
- October 19 - The first Blockbuster store opened in Dallas, Texas.
- October 25 – The airline Emirates is established in Dubai and makes its first flight, to Karachi, Pakistan.

=== November ===
- November 6
  - Palace of Justice siege: Members of the 19th of April Movement (M-19) Marxist guerrilla group take over the Palace of Justice of Colombia in Bogotá and hold the Supreme Court hostage. Hours later, after a military raid, the incident leaves almost half of the 25 Supreme Court Justices dead.
  - The Argentine tourist village of Villa Epecuén is permanently flooded through the collapse of a dam and dyke.
- November 9 – In an all-Soviet match, 22-year-old Garry Kasparov defeats Anatoly Karpov to become the youngest-ever undisputed winner of the World Chess Championship.
- November 12 – A total solar eclipse occurs over Antarctica at 14:11:22 UTC.
- November 13 – Armero tragedy: The Nevado del Ruiz volcano erupts, killing an estimated 23,000 people, including 21,000 killed by lahars, in the town of Armero, Colombia.
- November 19 – Cold War: In Geneva, U.S. President Ronald Reagan and Soviet Union leader Mikhail Gorbachev meet for the first time.
- November 20 – Microsoft Corporation releases the first U.S. release of Windows 1.0, as version 1.01. International support comes with the release of Windows 1.02 in Europe in May 1986.
- November 23 – EgyptAir Flight 648 is hijacked by the Abu Nidal group and flown to Malta, where Egyptian commandos storm the plane; 60 are killed by gunfire and explosions.
- November 25 – 1985 Aeroflot Antonov An-12 shoot-down: A Soviet Aeroflot Antonov An-12 cargo airplane, en route from Cuito Cuanavale to Luanda, is shot down by South African Special Forces and crashes approximately 43 km (27 mi) east of Menongue, the provincial center of the Cuando Cubango Province, Angola, killing 8 crew members and 13 passengers on board.
- November 29 – Gérard Hoarau, exiled political leader from the Seychelles, is assassinated in London.

=== December ===
- December 1
  - The Organization of Ibero-American States for Education, Science and Culture (Spanish: Organización e Estados Iberoamericanos para la Educación la Ciencia y la Cultura; OEI) is created.
  - The Ford Taurus and Mercury Sable are released for sale to the public in the US.
- December 8 – The South Asian Association for Regional Cooperation (SAARC) is established.
- December 11 – Hugh Scrutton is killed outside his Sacramento, California, computer rental store by a Unabomber explosive, becoming the first fatality of the bombing campaign.
- December 12 – Arrow Air Flight 1285R, a Douglas DC-8, crashes after takeoff from Gander, Newfoundland, killing 256 people – 248 of whom were U.S. servicemen returning to Fort Campbell, Kentucky, after overseeing a peacekeeping force in the Sinai Peninsula.
- December 20 – Pope John Paul II announces the institution of World Youth Day for Catholic youths.
- December 27
  - Rome and Vienna airport attacks: Abu Nidal terrorists open fire in the airports of Rome and Vienna, leaving 18 dead and 120 injured.
  - American naturalist Dian Fossey is found brutally murdered in Rwanda.

=== Date unknown ===
- The fullerene Buckminsterfullerene (C_{60}) is first intentionally prepared by Harold Kroto, James R. Heath, Sean O'Brien, Robert Curl and Richard Smalley at Rice University in the US.
- DNA is first used in a criminal case.
- The 1983–85 famine in Ethiopia continues; USA for Africa (We Are the World) and Live Aid raise funds for famine relief.
- The Union for Aromanian Language and Culture, an Aromanian cultural organization, is founded in Freiburg im Breisgau by the Aromanian professor Vasile Barba.
- Africa has a population growth of 3.2 percent per year.

=== World population ===
World population
	1985	1980		1990	
World	4,830,979,000	4,434,682,000	396,297,000	5,263,593,000	432,614,000
Africa	541,814,000	469,618,000	72,196,000	622,443,000	80,629,000
Asia	2,887,552,000	2,632,335,000	255,217,000	3,167,807,000	280,255,000
Europe	706,009,000	692,431,000	13,578,000	721,582,000	15,573,000
South America	401,469,000	361,401,000	40,068,000	441,525,000	40,056,000
North America	269,456,000	256,068,000	13,388,000	283,549,000	14,093,000
Oceania	24,678,000	22,828,000	1,850,000	26,687,000	2,009,000

== Nobel Prizes ==

- Physics – Klaus von Klitzing
- Chemistry – Herbert A. Hauptman, Jerome Karle
- Literature – Claude Simon
- Peace – International Physicians for the Prevention of Nuclear War
- Economics – Franco Modigliani
- Nobel Prize in Physiology or Medicine – Michael Stuart Brown, Joseph L. Goldstein
