= Andrés Almarales =

Colombian guerilla leader (1935–1985)

- Born: Andrés Almarales Manga c. 1935; Cienaga, Colombia
- Died: 7 November 1985 (aged 49–50); Bogotá, Colombia
- Cause of death: Suicide
- Organization: 19th of April Movement
- Political party: Colombian Communist Party

Andrés Almarales Manga (c. 1935 – 7 November 1985) was one of the commanders of the 19th of April Movement (M-19) guerrilla group. He was a member of the Colombian Communist Party. He worked with the socialist groups under Antonio Garcia and with the United People's Front with the priest, Camilo Torres. Almarales received guerrilla instruction in Cuba and the communist countries of Europe.

== Biography ==
Almarales was a founder of the M-19 and representative to the camera from the Socialist Anapo. He participated in stealing weaponry from the North Corner and in terrorist activities in the south of the country. His group recruited guerrillas and supporters in the union sector. Captured in the municipality of Bolivar (Santander) in 1979, Almares was put under house arrest and found guilty by Picota. When he rejoined civilian life, he wrote works on syndicalism and shortly thereafter helped plan the capture of the Dominican Republic. Later, his crimes were pardoned during the government of Belisario Betancur.

When Carlos Toledo Plata was assassinated in 1984 in Bucaramanga, Almares organized the memorial service in Romero Park, in front of the central cemetery of that city, as an insult to then-president Belisario Betancur and the Time newspaper. His group recruited young people for the armed resistance movement. Shortly thereafter, he moved to the Valley of the Cauca and collaborated with the M-19 to protect around Cali. In a popular action by the Patriotic Union (Colombia) in the Plaza de Bolivar of Bogota, Almarales spoke rudely comparing the press to a "sewer", referring to President Betancur, minister of Government Jaime Castro and the Colombian conservative group.

On 24 August 1984, he arranged a ceasefire between his group and the government of President Betancur. In front of all the television networks, he declared: "As of today, not a drop of blood was spilled by the subversives." Almarales participated in the peace process.

In November 1985 he took part in the attack on the Palace of Justice in Bogota. Later he was buried alongside Luis Otero Cifuentes and Alfonso Jacquin. There are two versions of his death:

1. Most well-known: he committed suicide in the Palace with the hostages.
2. He was escorted by the military to the Florero House in Bogotá where he was tortured and assassinated in the Usaquén Escuela de Caballeria and secretly buried in the Palace with the others similarly killed.
