= Alfonso Jacquin =

Colombian lawyer and guerrilla fighter

Alfonso Jacquin Gutiérrez (30 April 1953, in Santa Marta – 7 November 1985, in Bogotá) was a Colombian lawyer and guerrilla fighter, a founding member of the National Directorate of the M-19 guerrilla movement. He was killed in the Palace of Justice siege in Bogotá.

Jacquin was a constitutional lawyer in the University of Atlántico, and became professor of law in the Free University of Barranquilla. He was a brilliant orator and a close friend of Jaime Bateman and Carlos Toledo Plata.

He joined the M-19 movement at the beginning of the 1980s. After a truce had been agreed in April 1984, he took part, along with Antonio Navarro Wolff, in an attack on the La Sabana tourist train between Bogotá and Zipaquirá. For this action he was tried and convicted, but was pardoned by the Supreme Court of Justice.

After the truce and the peace process had failed, Jacquin, together with Andrés Almarales and Luis Otero Cifuentes, was among the commanders of the "Iván Marino Ospina" company of about 40 guerrillas which stormed the Palace of Justice on 6-7 November 1985. For over 14 hours the guerrillas held captive the Supreme Court judges, including the Court president, Chief Justice Alfonso Reyes Echandía. Jacquin was killed during the recapture of the Palace by the Colombian army and police. His remains during missed till 2018 when being discovered, after DNA identification practicing in the grave of a former bodyguard of the president of the supreme court.

== See also ==
- Andrés Almarales
- Luis Otero Cifuentes
