= AFEUR =

AFEUR may refer to:

- Agrupación de Fuerzas Especiales Antiterroristas Urbanas, a counter-terrorism unit in the National Army of Colombia
- Air Forces Europe, a designation for the US' Third Air Force
