= Luis Otero Cifuentes =

Colombian politician and guerilla (1943-1985)

- Born: 25 September 1943; Cali, Colombia
- Died: 7 November 1985 (aged 42); Palace of Justice, Bogotá, Colombia
- Occupation: Guerilla
- Movement: M-19 Movement

Luis Otero Cifuentes (25 September 1943 – 7 November 1985) was a Colombian anthropologist and a M-19 guerrilla member. He was killed in the Palace of Justice siege in Bogotá.

== Biography ==
Cali-born Luis Otero Cifuentes studied in the Free University of Colombia School and Anthropology in the National University of Colombia. He became a member of the Communist Youth (in Spanish Juventud Comunista, JuCo) and fought in Cuba on the side of Fidel Castro in the Escambray. Back in Colombia, he was one of the founders of the 19th of April Movement (M-19), one of the "Second Wave" groups prioritising urban action with no specific ideological position. Otero Cifuentes planned the capture of the Dominican Republic embassy by a M-19 guerrilla squad in 1980, which lasted 61 days. In 1985, he was a leader of the assault on the Palace of Justice where he is believed to have been killed during the recapture of the building by the Army. His corpse was never found.

== See also ==
- Andrés Almarales
- Alfonso Jacquin

== Bibliography ==
- Behar, Olga (1985). Las guerras de la paz (Wars in peacetime). Bogotá: Planeta.
- Lara Salive, Patricia (1982). Siembra vientos y recogerás tempestades (Sow winds, reap tempests). Barcelona : Fontamara.
