= Iván Marino Ospina =

Colombian paramilitary leader

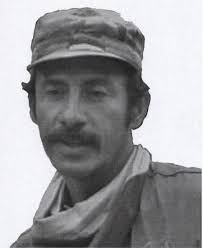
- Born: April 16, 1940; Roldanillo, Colombia
- Died: August 28, 1985 (aged 45); Cali, Colombia
- Other names: Felipe
- Known for: Colombian guerrilla

Iván Marino Ospina (called by his colleagues "Ivan the Terrible") (1940 – August 28, 1985) was a Colombian guerrilla and co-founder of the revolutionary group 19th of April Movement (M-19).

== Early life ==
Not much is known of Marino's early life. He was born in Valle del Cauca and studied history at an official college.

== Early career as a revolutionary ==
Ospina was convinced that the revolution in Colombia had to become violent to be successful. He then fought with the guerrillas in Venezuela. In 1970 he returned to Colombia to establish M-19 along with Jaime Bateman Cayón, a friend from the group Communist Youth (Juventudes Comunistas, JUCO), who had recently been expelled from the FARC. Ospina became the second in command of M-19. A few days after this promotion, Ospina was arrested in Cali and sent to Bogotá where he was tortured in the notorious "Sacromonte caves" to the point that he made a suicide attempt. Six months later Ospina, disguised as a major of the Army, escaped and resumed the role of second in command.

== Leader of M-19 ==
Bateman died on April 28, 1983, in a plane crash, and Ospina inherited the leadership of the guerrilla group. As such, he was in Madrid for the controversial meetings with President Belisario Betancur which would lead to a truce agreement in 1984. In December of that year, at a reunion in Mexico, Ospina made what would be a monumental faux pas: he applauded mafia threats to Americans living in Colombia. This tactical error cost him the leadership of M-19. He was replaced by Álvaro Fayad. His position, always on the side of the "hard", earned him the nickname "Ivan el terrible."

== Death ==
Ospina died in a military operation against the guerrilla group by the army in August 1985 in the city of Cali.

According to the official version, intelligence forces involved in the operation found a house in which was the commander of M-19. The house was besieged on the morning of August 28 and after an hour of combat, Ivan Marino Ospina, who until a few hours earlier had been the chief of M-19, was killed, along with his bodyguard, Gerardo Ospina. His son Jorge Iván Ospina, future mayor of Cali, was injured in the operation, as was Antonio Navarro Wolff, future governor of the Department of Nariño.

On November 6, 1985, a group of M-19 guerrillas named themselves the "Ivan Marino Ospina Company" after the recently deceased commander and commenced an attack on the Colombian Palace of Justice.

== Portrayal on television ==
The character of Ivan Torres in the television series Narcos is based on Ospina. He is portrayed as a naïve revolutionary who is manipulated by Pablo Escobar into leading the attack on the Colombian Palace of Justice. In the series Ivan is killed by Pablo Escobar after the raid.
