= Fanny González Franco =

Colombian lawyer (1934–1985)

Fanny González Franco (Pensilvania, Caldas, December 30, 1934 – Bogotá, November 7, 1985) was a Colombian lawyer and jurist. She graduated from the Pontifical Bolivarian University in 1958 as first female lawyer from the university. She was also the first woman to be a magistrate of the Supreme Court of Justice of Colombia. She died while serving as a magistrate of the Supreme Court of Justice of Colombia Labor Chamber on November 7, 1985 when the building was attacked and occupied by M-19 guerrillas during the Palace of Justice siege.

== Early life and education ==
She was born on December 30, 1931, in Pensilvania, Caldas to Juan José González and Elisa Franco as one of 19 children, who came from a family of farmers that lived in Manizales. After graduating from high school, she continued her studies at the Pontifical Bolivarian University with the support of its rector, Félix Henao Botero. He offered his support after a brief conversation they had during Holy Week in Aguadas, where Fanny was visiting her brother. She enrolled as the first woman to study in the university's Faculty of Law.

== Career ==
After receiving her degree, she served as a judge in Aguadas before being appointed as a judge in Manizales. In March 1984, she was appointed to the Labor Chamber of the Supreme Court of Justice of Colombia, initially serving in a provisional capacity. Upon her subsequent permanent appointment, she became the first female magistrate to hold that position. However during the plenary session to confirm her appointment, her nomination faced resistance from some magistrates specifically because she was a woman.

== Palace of Justice siege ==
Franco was killed during the occupation of Supreme Court of Justice of Colombia by M-19 guerrillas.
