= Alfonso Reyes Echandía =

Colombian jurist

- Born: 14 July 1932; Chaparral, Tolima
- Died: 7 November 1985 (aged 53); Bogotá, Colombia
- Education: Universidad Externado de Colombia
- Occupations: Jurist, educator and magistrate
- Relatives: Darío Echandía (cousin)

Alfonso Reyes Echandía (14 July 1932 – 7 November 1985) was a Colombian educator, jurist and magistrate of the Supreme Court of Colombia, who served as its President from 24 January 1985 until his death in the Palace of Justice siege by the M-19 guerrillas in November 1985.

The Palace of Justice of Colombia is named after him.
