= Álvaro Fayad =

Colombian guerilla leader (1946–1986)

Álvaro Fayad Delgado
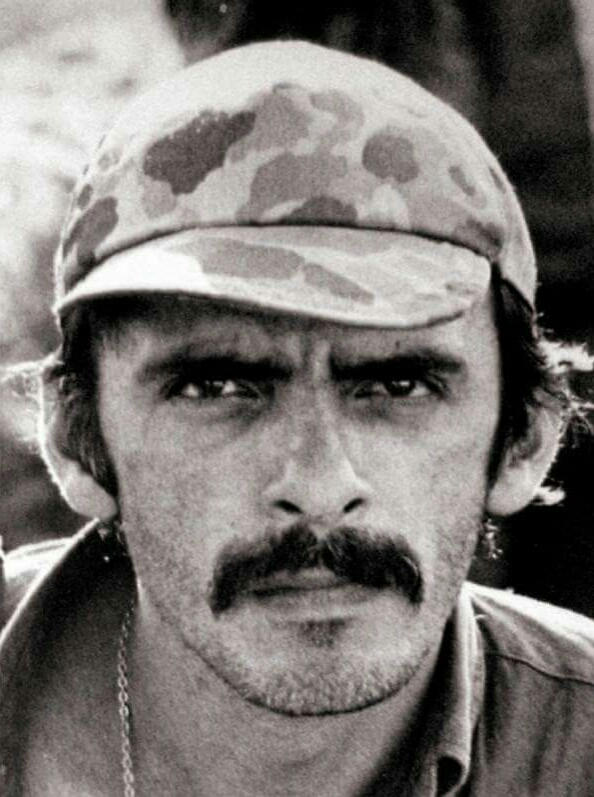
- Born: July 24, 1946; Ulloa Valley, Colombia
- Died: March 13, 1986 (aged 39); Bogotá, Colombia
- Other name: El Turco
- Known for: Colombian guerrilla

Álvaro Fayad Delgado a.k.a. "The Turk" (Spanish: el Turco; July 24, 1946 – March 13, 1986) was a Colombian guerrilla who co-founded and lead the 19th of April movement (M-19), founded in 1970.

== Early life ==
Fayad was born in Ulloa Valley on July 24, 1946, and grew up in Cartago, Valle del Cauca. He obtained his high school diploma from the Seminary of Santa Rosa, and entered the National University of Colombia in 1965 to study psychology. There he met fellow militant Camilo Torres Restrepo. Fayad entered the Colombian Communist Youth (JUCO) and there met Jaime Bateman Cayón, an influential figure in his life. He and Bateman joined the Revolutionary Armed Forces of Colombia, where they remained until the end of 1969, when they entered the National Popular Alliance.

== Career in M-19 ==
Bateman and Fayad co-founded M-19 in response to the allegedly fraudulent defeat of General Rojas Pinilla in the presidential elections of April 19, 1970. Fayad played a critical role within its organization and other guerrilla detachments like the Popular Liberation Army.

On January 17, 1974, M-19 stole the sword of Bolívar, arguing that it symbolized both nationalism and the Bolivarian Movement. Seventeen years later, on January 31, 1991, M-19 leader Antonio Navarro returned the sword as part of the group's peace negotiations with the government.

Spectacular actions as this were carried out by the M-19 in later years, but they were not successful overall. An arms heist in Cantón Norte only earned a jail term for the leaders of M-19, including Fayad. He went to trial with 219 members of M-19 in a military hearing, and served as his own lawyer; his defense appears in The Wars of the Peace by Olga Behar, along with descriptions of the torture endured by him and his companions. He was sentenced to 26 years in jail by the Military Court, but he was granted amnesty by the government of Belisario Betancur. Fayad met with the chief executive several times to negotiate peace; in October 1983 in Madrid, Spain, they negotiated an agreement which was signed in Corinto in August 1984.

== Death ==
Fayad was killed by the police in the Quinta Paredes district of Bogotá in 1986.
