= Palace of Justice siege =

1985 attack on the Supreme Court of Colombia by M-19 guerillas

- Part of Colombian armed conflict
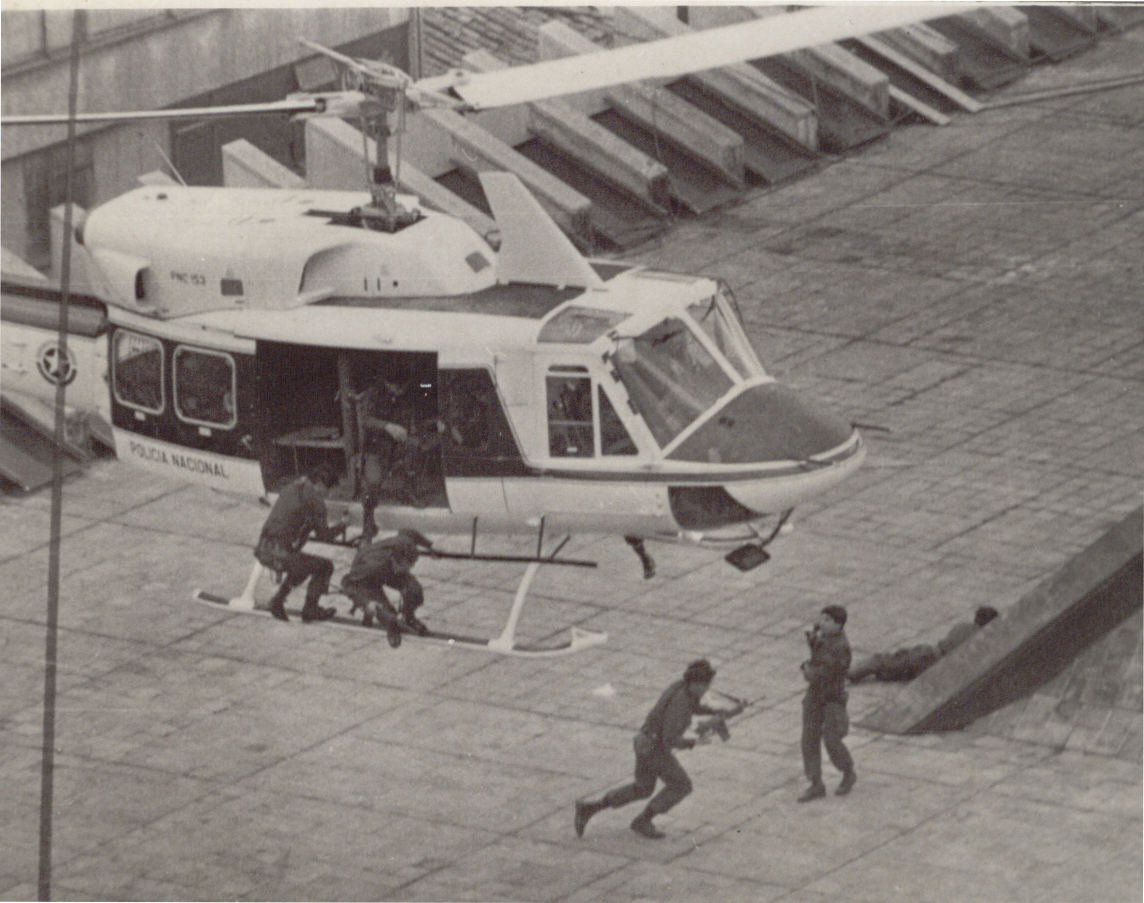
- A Colombian Police Bell 212 deploying troops on the roof of the Palace of Justice during the siege
Date	6–7 November 1985
Location	Palace of Justice, Bogotá, Colombia
Result	Colombian government victory: Destruction of the building.; Creation of the AFEUR unit.

Belligerents
(Colombia) Colombian government	M19

Commanders and leaders
(Colombia) Gen. Miguel Vega Uribe (Colombia) Gen. Augusto Moreno Guerrero (Colombia) Gen. Rafael Samudio Molina (Colombia) Gen. Víctor Alberto Delgado Mallarino (Colombia) Col. Alfonso Plazas Vega	Luis Otero Cifuentes † Alfonso Jacquin Andrés Almarales

Units involved
Colombian Army; National Police; Department of Security	Ivan Marino Ospina Company

Strength
≈1,000; 2 squadrons of 4 EE-9 Cascavel and EE-11 Urutu	35; 3 vehicles

Casualties and losses
11 killed	33 killed
- 43 civilians killed 11 missing

The Palace of Justice siege was an attack carried out in Bogotá, Colombia, on November 6–7, 1985, in which a guerrilla commando of the 19th of April Movement (M-19) took over the Palace of Justice, housing the Supreme Court and the Council of State. The guerrillas held roughly 350 people hostage, among them Supreme Court justices, councilors of state, judicial staff, employees, and visitors. The building stood on the north side of the Plaza de Bolívar, facing the National Capitol, seat of Congress, and one block from the Casa de Nariño, the president's residence. The group, calling themselves the "Iván Marino Ospina Company" after an M-19 commander who had been killed by the Colombian military on 28 August 1985, intended to hold a trial against President Belisario Betancur. Hours later, the military initiated a raid. The siege lasted 28 hours and left 101 people dead, including 11 of 25 Supreme Court justices. The Minister of Government at the time, Jaime Castro, described the event as the gravest act of political terrorism in Colombian history.

Approximately 11 people were initially reported missing. The figure was reduced to 7 after the Attorney General's Office announced in 2000 that the remains of Ana Rosa Castiblanco, a cafeteria worker, had been recovered from a mass grave. On October 17, 2015, the Institute of Legal Medicine announced the identification of the remains of Cristina del Pilar Guarín Cortés, Lucy Amparo Oviedo, and Luz Mary Portela. In 2017, the Attorney General's Office reported that it had fully identified the remains of auxiliary magistrate Emiro Sandoval. From 2005 onward, the Attorney General's Office investigated the cases of civilians who left the building alive in the custody of the security forces during the Army's retaking of the Palace and subsequently disappeared. Two colonels and retired Colonel Luis Alfonso Plazas Vega were prosecuted as a result. Plazas Vega was convicted in 2010 but was acquitted and released by the Supreme Court of Justice on December 16, 2015. Retired General Jesús Armando Arias Cabrales was sentenced to 35 years' imprisonment by the Supreme Court of Justice of Colombia in 2019. Retired Colonel Edilberto Sánchez Rubiano, retired Major Óscar William Vásquez, and retired Captains Luis Fernando Nieto Velandia, Antonio Rubay Jiménez Gómez, and Ferney Ulmardín Causayá Peña were each sentenced to 40 years by the Superior Tribunal of Bogotá in 2021.

== Background ==
Major drug traffickers had issued death threats against the Supreme Court Justices since 1985, with the intention of forcing them to rule against the constitutionality of the extradition treaty with the United States.

=== Security agency foreknowledge ===
According to the investigation carried out by the Special Court of Instruction created by decree 3300 of 1985, state security agencies and even the media had varying levels of knowledge about the siege prior to the attack. A month earlier, two guerrillas were arrested loitering around the Palace and had building plans in their possession. The military authorities had also found, in a raid on a residence south of Bogotá, a cassette containing the proclamation M-19 intended to have broadcast as one of their demands. Additionally, suspicion exists regarding the speed of the military's response, seen in the prompt arrival of armored cars, despite the great distance between their base and the Palace of Justice.

In 2007 the testimony of an alleged witness, former policeman and intelligence agent Ricardo Gámez, gave further support to the claims of state foreknowledge. Gamez, who first tried to file a report of misconduct in 1989 had been deemed unreliable by the Attorney General's Office for the Military Forces and Prosecutor's Office, but parts of his testimony were later corroborated by the discovery of video recordings showing hostages who were later disappeared or died under torture being evacuated from the Palace. The witness said that days before the takeover of the Palace of Justice, all intelligence personnel were quartered under the warning that something was going to happen and that an operational command had already been set up in the Casa del Florero. At 5:30 AM (UTC−5) hours before the takeover, Gámez and several intelligence agents were located in Carrera Septima near Santander Park, waiting for the attack to begin.

== Siege ==
=== Day one: 6 November ===
On 6 November 1985, at 11:35 a.m., three vehicles holding 35 guerrillas (25 men and 10 women) stormed the Palace of Justice of Colombia, entering through the basement. Meanwhile, another group of guerrillas disguised as civilians took over the first floor and the main entrance. The guerrillas killed security guards Eulogio Blanco and Gerardo Díaz Arbeláez and building manager Jorge Tadeo Mayo Castro.

Jorge Medina, a witness present in the basement at the start of the siege, said that "suddenly, the guerrillas entered the basement in a truck. They opened fire with their machine guns against everyone who was there". The official report judged that the guerrillas planned the takeover operation to be a 'bloody takeover'. According to these official sources the guerrillas "set out to shoot indiscriminately and detonate building-shaking bombs while chanting M19-praising battle cries."

The M-19 lost one guerrilla and a nurse during the initial raid on the building. After the guerrillas had killed the security personnel guarding the building, they installed armed posts at strategic places, such as the stairs and the fourth floor. A group of guerrillas led by Commander Luis Otero got to the fourth floor and kidnapped the President of the Supreme Court, Chief Justice Alfonso Reyes Echandía.

In the meantime, many hostages took refuge in empty offices on the first floor, where they hid until around 2 pm. The assailants took 300 people hostage, including the 24 justices and 20 other judges. The first hostage the group asked for was the Supreme Court Justice and President of the Constitutional Court, then called Sala Constitucional, Manuel Gaona Cruz, who was in charge of delivering the opinion of the court with regard to the constitutionality of the extradition treaty between Colombia and the United States. About three hours after the initial seizure, army troops rescued about 200 hostages from the lower three floors of the building; the surviving gunmen and remaining hostages occupied the upper two floors.

=== Day two: 7 November ===
The M-19 rebels freed State Councillor Reynaldo Arciniegas at 8:30am, with a message for the government to allow the entry of the Red Cross and initiate dialogue. However, the assault on the Palace of Justice commenced later that morning.

== Assault ==
The operation to retake the building was led by General Jesús Armando Arias Cabrales, commander of the Thirteenth Army Brigade in Bogotá; he appointed Colonel Alfonso Plazas, commander of an armored cavalry battalion, to personally oversee the operation. The retaking of the building began that day and ended on 7 November, when Army troops stormed the Palace of Justice, after having occupied some of the lower floors during the first day of the siege. After surrounding the building with EE-9 Cascavel armored cars and EE-11 Urutu armored personnel carriers and soldiers armed with G3 assault rifles and MP5 submachine guns, they stormed the building sometime after 2 pm. The EE-9s knocked down the building's massive doorway, and even made some direct hits against the structure's external walls.

A fire broke out inside the building during the assault. The results of the tests carried out later by ballistics experts and investigators demonstrated that the most likely cause of the burning criminal records, containing proof and warrants against many criminals, was the recoil effect of the army's rockets and not part of M-19's actions. Tests proved that if fired by a soldier standing within twenty feet of wood-lined walls of the library that housed Colombian legal archives, the intense heat generated by the rocket's rear blast could have ignited the wooden paneling. In any event, in a shelved area stacked high with old papers, files, books, and newspapers, the quantity of explosives used by the military virtually guaranteed a conflagration." In total, over 6000 different documents were burned. The fire lasted about 2 days, even with efforts from firemen to try to smother the flames. An investigated theory to the "disappearance" of the missing entities in the siege is that they were charred in the fire, and were not able to be identified in any way, and without having been found, these entities are regarded as missing in action. This theory is still being studied in the different trials of the case.

Ninety-eight people died during the assault on the Palace. Those killed consisted of hostages, soldiers, and guerrillas, including their leader, Andrés Almarales, and four other senior commanders of M-19. After the raid, another Supreme Court justice died in a hospital after suffering a heart attack.

== Aftermath ==
The siege of the Palace of Justice and the subsequent raid was one of the deadliest attacks in Colombia in its war with leftist rebels. The M-19 group was still a potent force after the raid, but was severely hampered by the deaths of five of its leaders. In March 1990, it signed a peace treaty with the government. President Betancur went on national TV on the night of 7 November, saying he took full responsibility for the "terrible nightmare"; He offered condolences to the families of those who died, civilians and rebels, and said he would continue to look for a peaceful solution with the rebels. Exactly a week later, on 14 November, he offered condolences for another tragedy: the eruption of the Nevado del Ruiz volcano, which killed 25,000 people in the Armero tragedy, in which he remarked "We have had one national tragedy after another". The siege led to the creation of the AFEUR unit within the Colombian Army to manage this kind of situation. Colombia's Armed Forces did not have antiterrorist units specifically trained for urban operations before the siege, and some partially blamed the outcome on the relative inexperience of the personnel assigned to the task.

== Dead magistrates ==
The magistrates killed were:

1. Manuel Gaona Cruz
2. Alfonso Reyes Echandía
3. Fabio Calderón Botero
4. Dario Velásquez Gaviria
5. Eduardo Gnecco Correa
6. Carlos Medellín Forero
7. Ricardo Medina Moyano
8. Alfonso Patiño Rosselli
9. Horacio Montoya Gil
10. Pedro Elías Serrano Abadía
11. Fanny González Franco
12. Dante Luis Fiorillo Porras (died of a heart attack)
13. Carlos Horacio Urán Rojas

== Alleged drug cartel links ==
Shortly after the siege, the U.S. and Colombian Justice Minister Enrique Parejo asserted that drug traffickers had financed the operation in order to get rid of various criminal files that were lost during the event, hoping to avoid extradition. Less than a week after the events, Humberto Murica, a retired Supreme Court Judge who had survived the siege stated to the Washington Post that he rejected claims that M19 was concerned with the files based on the guerrillas' conversations.

It has also been noted that destroying the files housed at the Palace of Justice would not have prevented extradition as copies of the files were stored elsewhere, including at the Ministry of Foreign Affairs and at the US Embassy. The Special Commission of Inquiry, established by the Betancur government after intense public pressure, released a June 1986 report which concluded that the destruction of files was not a goal of the M19 operation.

Journalist Ana Carrigan, who quoted the June 1986 report in her book on the siege and originally dismissed any such links between the M-19 and the Medellín Cartel, told Cromos magazine in late 2005 that she now believes that the Cartel may have financially supported the M-19. Pablo Escobar's son, Sebastián Marroquín, claimed that while his father did not come up with or plan the raid, he did pay M-19 a million dollars. Escobar claimed he supported M-19 because he "believed in the ideals" [of M-19] and "looked for ways to preserve and support them".

On the same day of the siege, the Supreme Court's docket apparently called for the beginning of pending deliberations on the constitutionality of the Colombia-United States extradition treaty. The M-19 was publicly opposed to extradition supposedly on nationalist grounds. Several of the magistrates had been previously threatened by drug lords in order to prevent any possibility of a positive decision on the treaty. One year after the siege, the treaty was declared unconstitutional.

Former Assistant to the Colombian Attorney General, National Deputy Comptroller, author and renowned Professor Jose Mauricio Gaona (son of murdered Supreme Court magistrate Manuel Gaona Cruz) along with the former Minister of Justice and Ambassador of Colombia to the United Kingdom, Carlos Medellín Becerra (son of magistrate Carlos Medellín Forero), have consistently pushed for further and broader lines of investigations related not only to the presumed links between the M-19 and the Medellín Cartel drug lords, but also to any other possible links to the investigations performed by the Justices of members of the Armed Forces. President Gustavo Petro, a former member of the M-19, has denied these accusations and dismissed them as based upon the inconsistent testimonies of drug lords. Petro has stated the surviving members of the M-19 do admit to their share of responsibility for the tragic events of the siege, on behalf of the entire organisation, but deny any links to the drug trade.

== Impunity ==
Later investigations and commentators consider both M-19 and the military as responsible for the deaths of the justices and civilians inside the building. Some have blamed President Belisario Betancur for not taking the necessary actions or for failing to negotiate, and others have commented on the possibility of a sort of de facto "24-hour coup", during which the military was in control of the situation. According to Ana Carrigan's 1993 book The Palace of Justice: A Colombian Tragedy, Supreme Court Chief Justice Alfonso Reyes was apparently burned alive during the assault, as someone incinerated his body after pouring gasoline over it. The book also asserts that, after the siege was over, some twenty-eight bodies were dumped into a mass grave and apparently soaked with acid, in order to make identification difficult. Carrigan argued that the bodies of the victims of the Nevado del Ruiz volcano eruption, which buried the city of Armero and killed more than 20,000 people, were dumped into the same mass grave, making any further forensic investigations impractical.

Despite numerous investigations and lawsuits to date, impunity prevailed for most of the subsequent decades. Carrigan asserted in her 1993 book that "Colombia has moved on... Colombia has forgotten the Palace of Justice siege". No definite responsibility has been fixed on the government or on the surviving members of the M-19 movement who were pardoned after they demobilized. Eduardo Umaña, the first attorney representing some of the families of the people killed during the siege, was assassinated in 1998, and several members of those families had to flee to Europe due to death threats made against them.

== The missing ==
The eleven missing Photos of the missing
Name	Occupation
Bernardo Beltrán Fernández	Cafeteria waiter
Héctor Jaime Beltrán Fuentes	Cafeteria waiter
Ana Rosa Castilblanco*	Assistant chef
David Celis	Cafeteria Chef
Norma Constanza Esguerra	Sold homemade pastries in cafeteria
Cristina Guarín Cortés	Teller in cafeteria
Gloria Stella Lizarazo Figueroa	Cafeteria employee
Luz Mary Portela León	Cafeteria dishwasher
Carlos Augusto Vera Rodríguez	Cafeteria manager
Gloria Anzola de Lanao	Niece of Aydee Anzola, state official
Irma Franco Pineda	Law student, M-19 guerrilla

At least 11 people disappeared during the events of the siege, most of them cafeteria workers; the fate of ten of them is unknown. It is likely that their remains may be among a number of unidentified and charred bodies, one of which was identified through DNA testing done by the National University of Colombia, leaving the fates of the other 10 still in question.

According to Ana Carrigan, Irma Franco, a law student and M-19 guerrilla, disappeared after she was captured. Carrigan wrote that Franco was seen in the custody of Colombian special forces by several hostages. Carrigan wrote that Franco left with several hostages and was never seen again. The Special Commission of Inquiry confirmed Franco's disappearance, and the judges requested that her case be thoroughly investigated.

One week after the siege, M-19 released a communique to the press claiming that six leaders, including Franco, and "seven other fighters" had all been "disappeared and murdered" by the army. From the tapes of the military and police inter-communications it is known that army intelligence arrested at least seventeen people in the course of the two-day siege. None of the M-19 leaders, with the exception of Andrés Almarales, were ever identified in the city morgue.

== Later developments ==
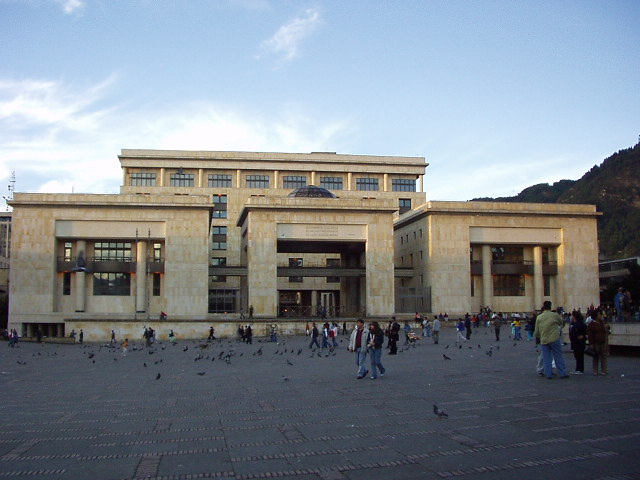
The new Palace of Justice building.

The events surrounding the Palace of Justice siege received renewed media coverage in Colombia during the 20th anniversary of the tragedy. Among other outlets, the country's main daily El Tiempo, the weekly El Espectador, and the Cromos magazine published several articles, interviews and opinion pieces on the matter, including stories about the survivors, as well as the plight of the victims' relatives and those of the missing.

=== 2005–2006 Truth Commission ===
The Supreme Court created a Truth Commission in order to investigate the siege. The Commission officially began its work on November 3, 2005.

=== 2006–2007 Judicial processes ===
On 22 August 2006, Attorney General Mario Iguarán announced that former Colonel Edilberto Sánchez, former B-2 intelligence chief of the Army's Thirteenth Brigade, would be summoned for questioning and investigated for the crimes of kidnapping and forced disappearance. Public prosecutors were to reopen the case after examining video tape recordings and identifying cafeteria manager Carlos Augusto Rodríguez being taken outside of the Palace of Justice alive by a soldier, together with other former M-19 hostages.

Sánchez was then detained. In May 2007, he was questioned by prosecutors about his possible role in the disappearance of Irma Franco and at least two cafeteria workers, who would have left the Palace alive. Sánchez rejected the charges and proclaimed his innocence. He accepted that he could have received the order to cover the exit of some hostages from the Palace of Justice.

=== 2008 Virginia Vallejo's testimony ===
On 11 July 2008, Virginia Vallejo, the television anchorwoman who was romantically involved with Pablo Escobar from 1983 to 1987 and author of 2007's Amando a Pablo, odiando a Escobar (Loving Pablo, Hating Escobar), was asked to testify in the reopened case of the siege of the Palace of Justice, in order to confirm events that she had described in her memoir, in the chapter "That Palace in Flames", in pages 230 to 266. In the Colombian Consulate in Miami, under oath, she described the relationship of the drug lord with the Sandinista Government of Nicaragua and the M-19; also, a meeting of Escobar with the rebel commander Ivan Marino Ospina, in which she had been present, two weeks before the latter was killed by the Army, on August 28, 1985.

In her judicial declaration, Vallejo confirmed how, in mid-1986, Escobar had told her that he had paid one million dollars in cash to the rebels, and another million in arms and explosives to steal his files from the Palace of Justice, before the Supreme Court began studying the extradition of the leading members of the cocaine cartels to the United States. During her testimony, that lasted five hours, the journalist described also photographs of sixteen bodies that she had received anonymously in that year. According to her, Escobar identified the victims as the employees of the cafeteria of the Palace and two rebel women that had been detained by the Army after the siege, and had been tortured and disappeared on orders of colonel Edilberto Sánchez, director of B-2, Military Intelligence. Though her testimony was protected under a gag order, several excerpts appeared on 17 August 2008 in El Tiempo, the newspaper of the Santos' family, including the vice president Francisco Santos, and defense minister Juan Manuel Santos. On radio stations, Vallejo accused the office of the Colombian Attorney General of filtering it to the media and adulterating the contents, to protect the military and the former presidential candidate Alberto Santofimio, Escobar's political ally. On 3 June 2010, Virginia Vallejo was granted political asylum in the United States.

=== Sentence and absolution of Colonel Plazas Vega ===
In 2010, retired Colonel Alfonso Plazas Vega was sentenced to 30 years imprisonment for his alleged role in forced disappearances after the siege.

The President of Colombia, Álvaro Uribe, reacted by declaring that he was "sad and hurt" by the decision. He announced his intention of seeking changes to the way military are judged in Colombia and asked for prison sentences for the actual instigators of the massacre, the M-19 guerrilla group. Uribe also had a meeting with the military command to find ways to protect them from "judiciary decisions that interfere with their work".

Nevertheless, Colombia's General Attorney declared that crimes against humanity took place during the siege, which allowed for the continued processing of another colonel and one general involved in the incident. María Stella Jara, the judge that handed the sentence to Colonel Plazas left the country after receiving multiple death threats to her and her son. She and her family had to live under heavy surveillance for the duration of the trial.

On 16 December 2015, Colonel Plazas Vega was declared innocent in a five to three vote by the Colombian Supreme Court and absolved of his previous 30-year prison sentence. The declaration was influenced by a revisiting of the case in the Supreme Court when the validity of testimonies of four witnesses came into question, along with absence of conclusive evidence to prove guilt in the charges brought again Plazas Vega. In 2022, a lawsuit was filed against Colonel Plazas Vega, by then residing in Florida, by the daughters of judge Carlos Horacio Urán Rojas. The resulting civil trial began in Miami in 2026.

== Depictions ==
On the 41st anniversary of the siege on November 6, 2026, Netflix released an eight episode drama series about the event, titled Palacio (Under Siege in the English version). It was directed by Jayro Bustamante, Edgar Nito, and Samir Oliveros and included Natalia Reyes, Luna Baxter, Mariana Gómez, Carlos Manuel Vesga, Robinson Diaz, and Santiago Alarcón among its cast.

== See also ==
- List of attacks on high courts
- Chameleon Operation (Colombia)
