= 1985 CFB Edmonton mid-air collision =

Collision of two aircraft in Alberta, Canada

Accident
- Date: 29 March 1985
- Summary: Mid-air collision
- Site: CFB Edmonton, Alberta, Canada; 53°41′14.1″N 113°28′40.7″W
- Total fatalities: 10
- Total survivors: 0

First aircraft
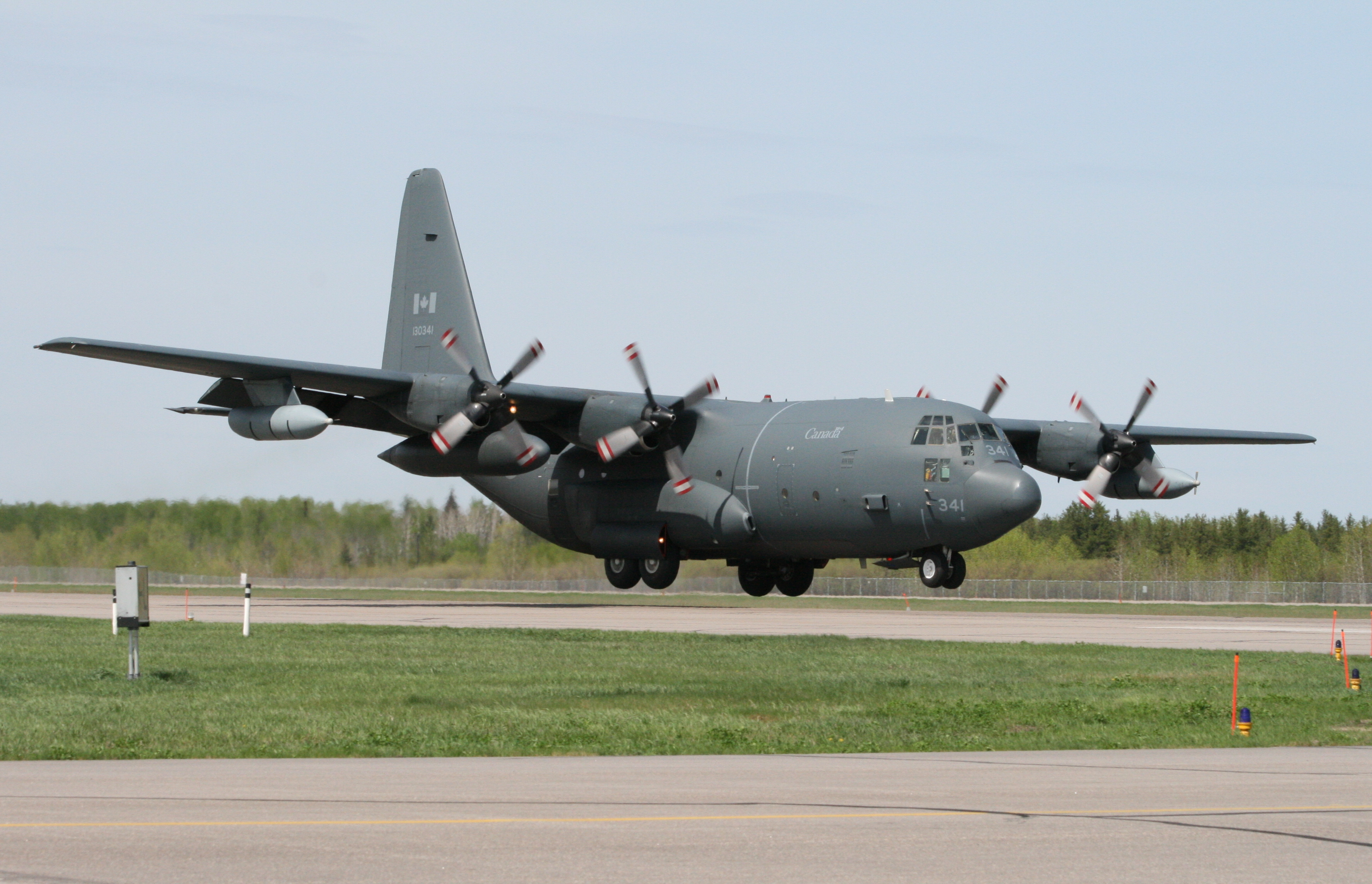
- A Canadian Armed Forces CC-130H Hercules in modern livery similar to the aircraft involved
- Type: Lockheed CC-130H Hercules
- Operator: Canadian Armed Forces
- Call sign: Trucker Lead
- Registration: 130330
- Occupants: 6
- Crew: 6
- Fatalities: 6
- Survivors: 0

Second aircraft
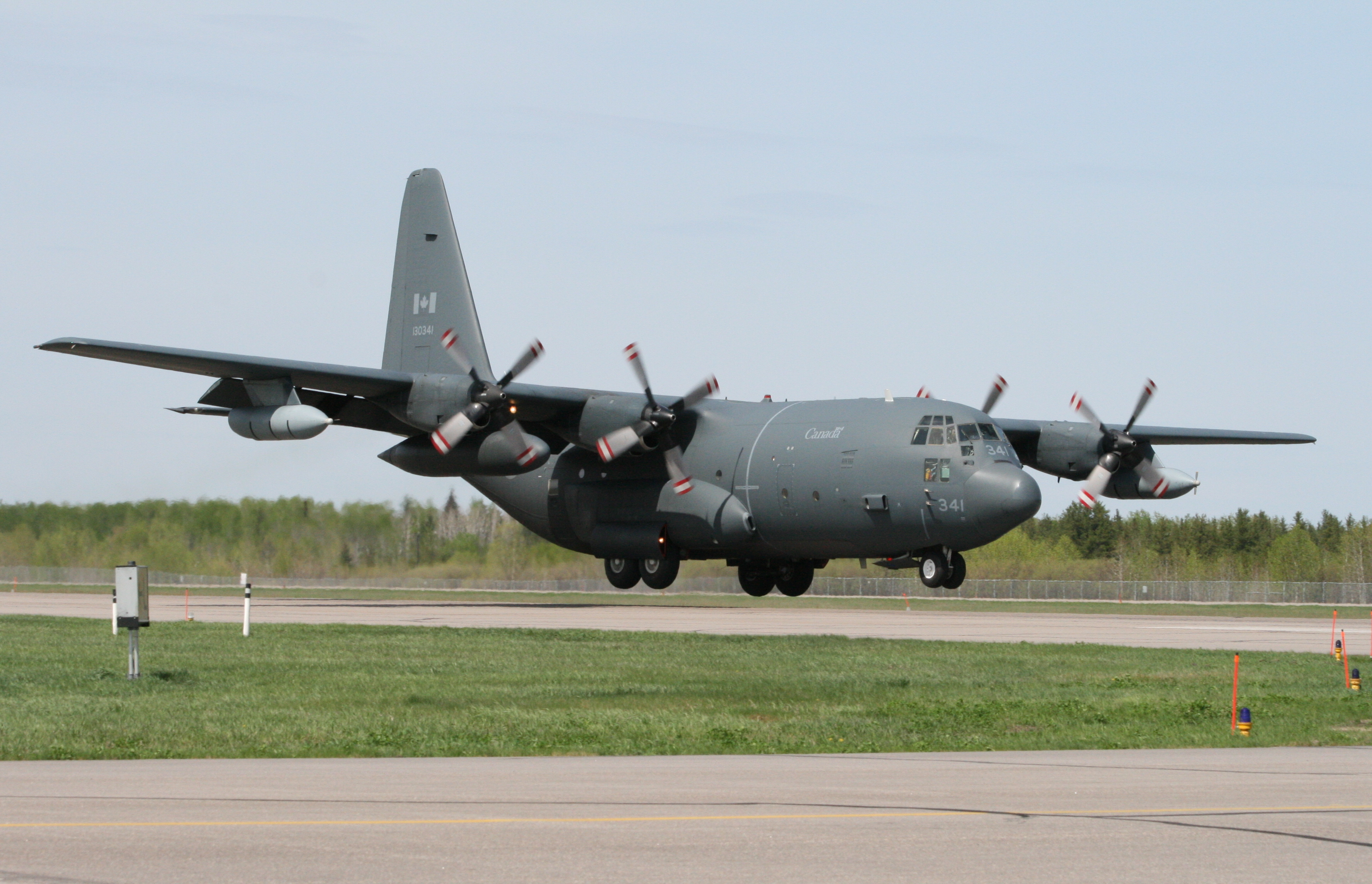
- A Canadian Armed Forces CC-130H Hercules in modern livery similar to the aircraft involved
- Type: Lockheed CC-130H Hercules
- Operator: Canadian Armed Forces
- Call sign: Trucker 2
- Registration: 130331
- Occupants: 4
- Crew: 4
- Fatalities: 4
- Survivors: 0

On 29 March 1985, two Lockheed CC-130H Hercules of the Royal Canadian Air Force collided mid-air above the Canadian Forces base in Edmonton, then called CFB Namao, killing all 10 on board both aircraft. It remains the deadliest aircraft accident in Alberta history and the deadliest Royal Canadian Air Force crash since the 1965 loss of a Canadair CL-28-2 Argus off Puerto Rico.

== Aircraft ==
Both aircraft were from the No. 435 Squadron of the Royal Canadian Air Force and were manufactured in 1974. Trucker Lead (serial number 130330) possessed a unique camouflage paint scheme called "grey ghost" which it was painted with in 1982 that featured three shades of grey rather than green like on subsequent aircraft.

== Personnel ==
The crew onboard both aircraft was composed of seven members of the No. 435 Squadron, two members of 429 Transport Squadron from CFB Winnipeg, and one exchange officer.

Trucker Lead was being flown by Capt. Lonnie Register, an exchange pilot from the US Air Force. Capt. Register was a Vietnam veteran who was in his last year of service before he planned on becoming a commercial pilot for Continental Airlines. Trucker 2 was being flown by Capt. Robert W. Drake.

== Accident ==
The accident occurred at 7:15 PM following a ceremonial flypast of the mess hall to commemorate the 61st anniversary of the RCAF. The aircraft were part of three plane formation with Trucker Lead in the front. The planes began an attempt of a manoeuvre known as the "battle break" that involved climbing and then turning in unison. During a left bank at 1,500 feet on approach to the runway, Trucker 2's wing collided with the wing of Trucker Lead causing both planes to plummet to the ground and explode near the end of the runway. One of the engines from the planes fell and crashed into a garage where one person was present causing minimal damage. One of the aircraft crashed into a wooden warehouse storing a Avro Lancaster from WWII while the other crashed between two fuel storage tanks scattering debris over an area equivalent to four city blocks. Both planes burst into flames, levelling the warehouse and melting nearby vehicles. The explosions shot fireballs into the sky which were visible from nearby Namao. Miraculously neither of the fuel tanks ignited despite the intense heat.

== Victims ==
The RCAF publicly released the names of the Canadian servicemen who died in the accident after contacting loved ones. Capt. Register's identity was confirmed by a public affairs officer for the Pentagon.

- Capt. Lonnie Register of El Paso, Texas
- Capt. Brian J. Tulloch of Winnipeg
- Capt. Kevin E. Kennedy of Douglastown, Quebec
- Cpl. Joseph M. Doucet of Girardville, Quebec
- Sgt. Robert H. Brown of Windsor, Nova Scotia
- Capt. Robert W. Drake of Edmonton
- Capt. David A. Whalen of Toronto
- Capt. John D. Thornton of Ottawa
- W.O. William I. Oness of Alsask, Saskatchewan
- Capt. David I. Mahaffey of Kingston, Ontario

== Aftermath ==
It took one and a half hours to get the post-crash fires under control. Residents of northeast Edmonton were asked to restrict water use to keep the water pressure high for the firefighters. Both flight recorders were recovered from the crash, and a five member inquiry was held as to the cause of the accident. The accident report has never been made public, but a news release on the report by the Department of National Defence stated that "based on information from the flight recorders and eyewitness reports, the investigating team was able to determine the first aircraft began the climb as briefed, but delayed the turn by four to five seconds."

The total damage of the accident was estimated at $50 million (equivalent to close to $130 million adjusting for inflation). The Base commander at the time, Col. Peter DeTracey, was moved to a desk job in Ottawa following the incident. Despite the accident report seemingly clearing him of wrongdoing in the eyes of many, he was not returned to his position.

== See also ==
- Green Ramp disaster - a deadly mid-air collision on a military base in the United States
- Trans-Canada Air Lines Flight 9 - another Canadian mid-air collision involving an aircraft from the RCAF
- 2009 California mid-air collision - a mid-air collision also involving Lockheed Hercules'
- Rescue 807 Crashes - altogether the deadliest aircraft accidents in Alberta history
