= Palace of Justice of Colombia =

Building in Bogotá, Colombia which houses the Supreme Court of Colombia

Coordinates: 4.5989°N 74.0756°W

Palace of Justice
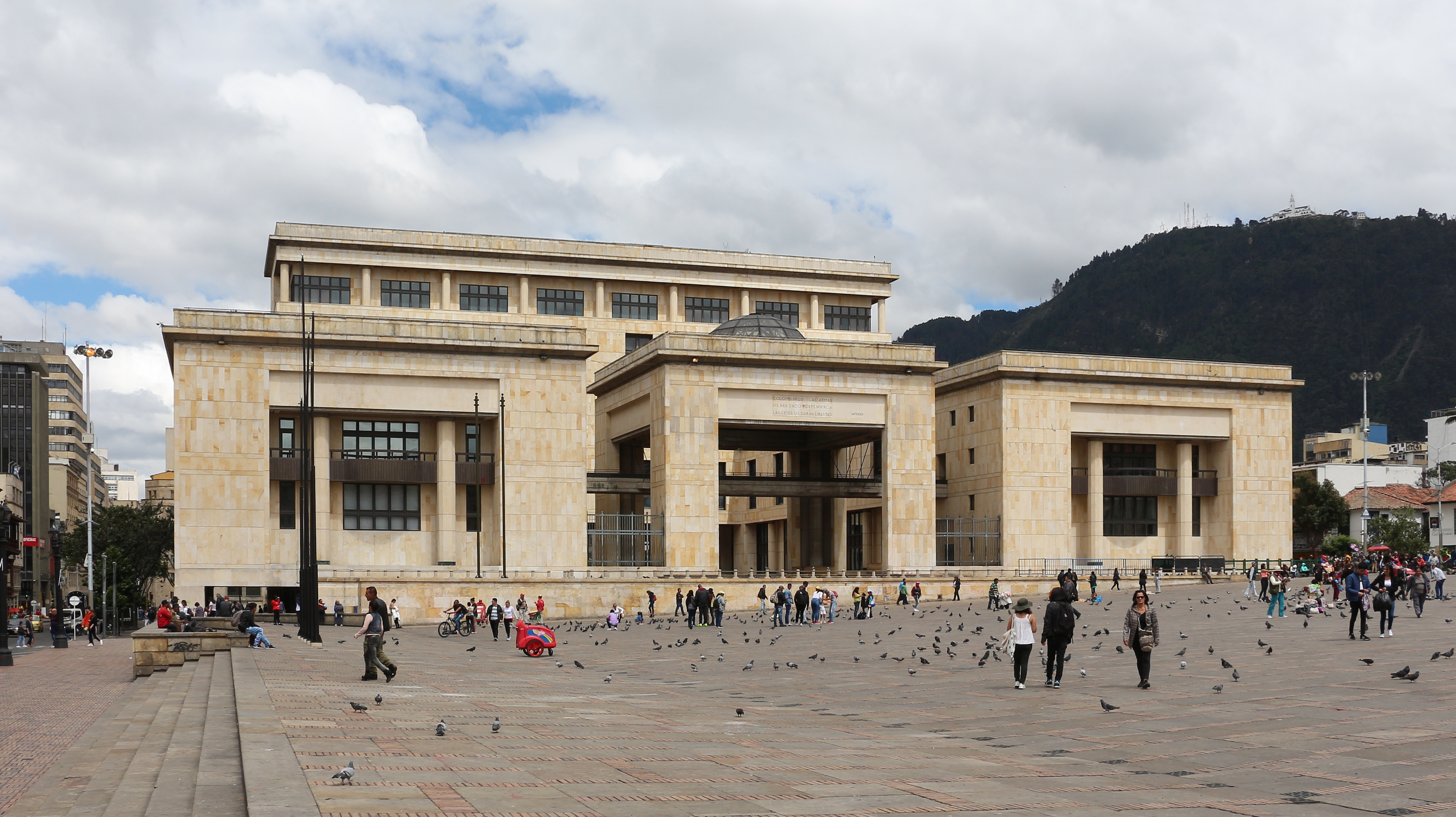
- Palace of Justice of Colombia

General information
- Location: Bogotá, Colombia

The Palace of Justice of Colombia (Spanish: Palacio de Justicia de Colombia) is a building located in Plaza de Bolívar square in the city of Bogotá, seat and symbol of the Judiciary of Colombia.

== History ==
Throughout the history of Colombia there have been three buildings that have served as headquarters for the Palace of Justice. The first was a neoclassical building designed by the architect Pablo de la Cruz, located on Calle 11 at Carrera 6 and operated since the 1920s. The building was destroyed by a fire during the riots of 9 April 1948, known as the Bogotazo after the assassination of Jorge Eliécer Gaitán.

The building that replaced this one was designed by the architect Roberto Londoño in the 1960s, of modernist tendency with neoclassical elements. It was located in Plaza de Bolívar and was destroyed on 6 November 1985 as a result of the capture by the M-19 guerrillas and the retaking of the palace by the army.

After the destruction of the Palace, the surviving magistrates, headed by Fernando Uribe Restrepo, worked from uncomfortable facilities of the Bank of the Republic building (Carrera 7 and Calle 27 in Bogotá) and then in a building in the north of Bogotá until the inauguration of the new building, located in the same place as the one destroyed in 1985 and designed by the same architect, Londoño. The building houses the Supreme Court of Justice, the Constitutional Court, the Council of State and the Supreme Judicial Council since 2004.

At the entrance is the only piece of the old structure: a plaque with a phrase of General Francisco de Paula Santander: Colombianos las armas os han dado la independencia, las leyes os darán la libertad (Colombians, weapons have given you independence, laws shall give you freedom).

It is named after Alfonso Reyes Echandía, who was president of the court and was killed in the 1985 siege.
