= Agrupación de Fuerzas Especiales Antiterroristas Urbanas =

Urban Counter-Terrorism Special Forces Group
- Agrupación de Fuerzas Especiales Antiterroristas Urbanas (Spanish)
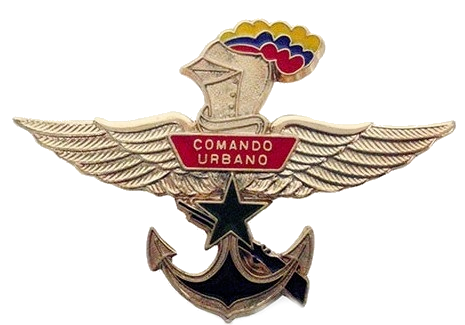
- AFEAU Insignia
- Active: 1985–present
- Country: Colombia
- Allegiance: Republic of Colombia
- Branch: Colombian Army
- Type: Special Forces
- Role: Special operations
- Size: Classified
- Garrison/HQ: Military School of Communications Battalion, Facatativa, Colombia
- Nicknames: AFEUR, AFEAU
- Engagements: Colombian Conflict

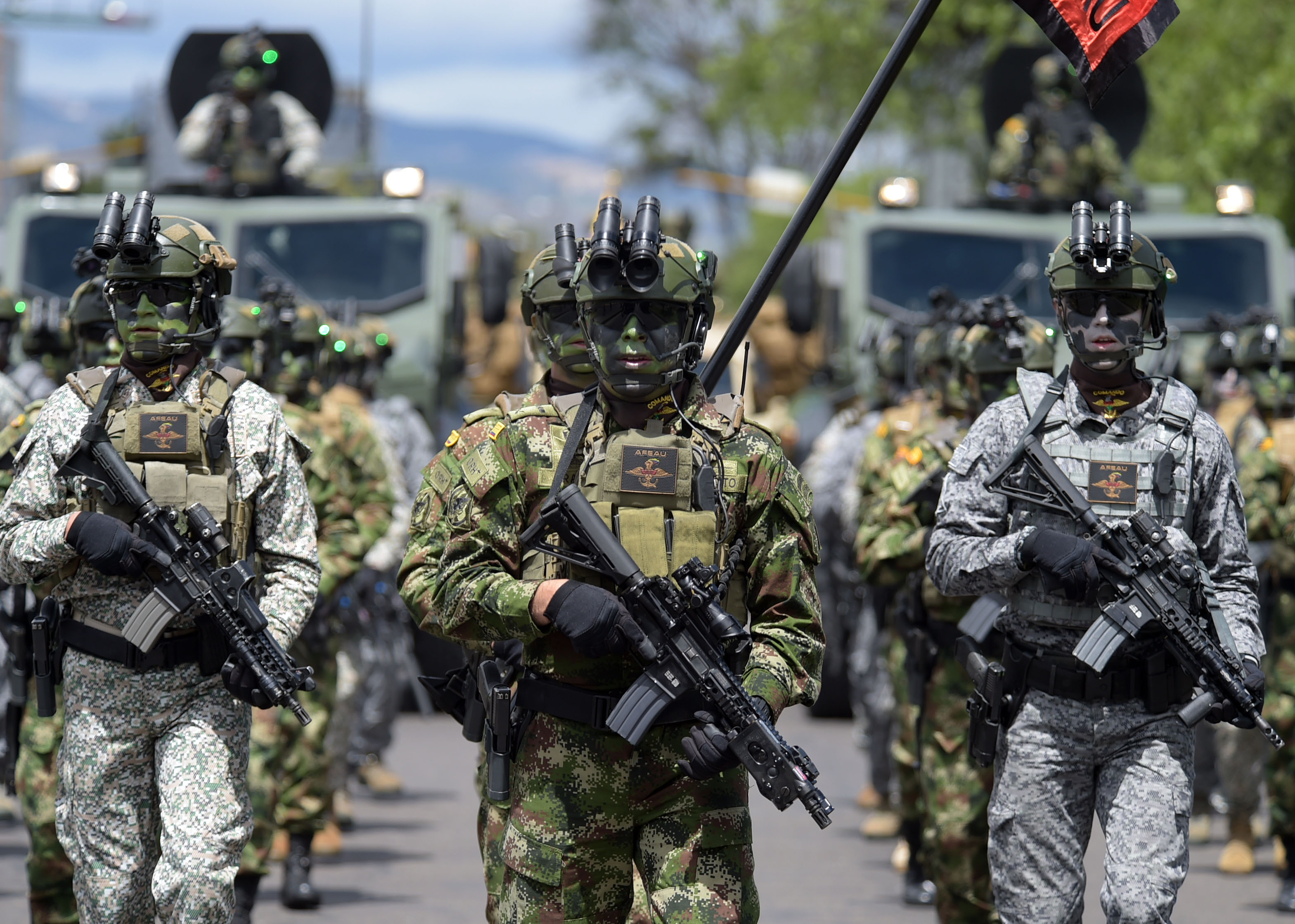
AFEUR members

The Urban Counter-Terrorism Special Forces Group - Alpha, otherwise known as AFEUR or AFEAU (Spanish: Agrupación de Fuerzas Especiales Antiterroristas Urbanas), is the army detachment of the elite AFEAU special operations group within the Colombian Armed Forces, dedicated to performing counter-terrorism operations, HVT acquisition or elimination, and hostage rescue.

The unit is also used for protection of VIPs. They protect the Colombian President when he travels, and provided protection for President Bill Clinton and President George W. Bush when they visited Cartagena in 2000 and 2004, respectively. They also provided the second security ring to President Bush's visit to Bogotá in 2007.

The full scope of this unit – and the operations it has been involved in – are both blacklisted. Some reports from Colombian media state that this unit has been involved in every top profile operation against guerrilla groups, in both preventive strikes and emergency response actions in urban and semi-urban areas all across Colombia, though details are kept in secret.

AFEUR answers directly to the General Command of the Armed Forces (Comando General de las Fuerzas Armadas), and usually has carte blanche to use any available military air transportation, weapon, or equipment as required to accomplish their missions.

== History ==
Due to terrorist acts conducted in cities by guerrilla groups, the Colombian Army needed a specially trained unit to deal with this threat. Such a unit's intended design would be to both operate and co-ordinate operations with other units of the army, and from other military branches.

Although Colombia's decades long conflict with guerrilla, paramilitary, drug cartels and other criminal organizations, had given many reasons for such a unit to exist, two terrorist acts in particular worked as catalysts for the formation of the unit: the Dominican embassy siege in 1980, and the Palace of Justice siege in 1985.

In 2003, as the unit's experience grew, and its rate of success increased, the Colombian Government decided to establish and assign further units to main cities across the nation. Such units are smaller in size, and are trained and operated under a single entity by the name of AFEAU.

That same year, the Colombian Navy also deployed its own AFEUR unit attached to the Marine Corps. Although trained by the Army unit, the Navy unit specializes in underwater infiltration training akin to its amphibious nature. This unit is intended to have the same capabilities as its Army counterpart, and provide Special Forces support to other conventional Marine Corps units when operating in semi-urban areas.

== Recruitment and training ==
Members of all branches of the Military of Colombia and the National Police are eligible to join AFEUR. Such personnel are required to have no criminal record, and are likely to have already received previous special operations training elsewhere, such as the Army’s Lancero course, or other training abroad.

Training takes place at the Colombian Army Signals School in Facatativá near Bogotá (which also serves as unit headquarters), and includes airborne operations, night operations, and close quarters combat. It is divided into two phases: the first phase focuses on teamwork buildup and training, whilst the second focuses on special skills training such as explosives handling, paramedic training, underwater operations, sharpshooting and marksmanship, amongst others depending on the specific AFEUR unit.

== Commando Forces tournaments ==
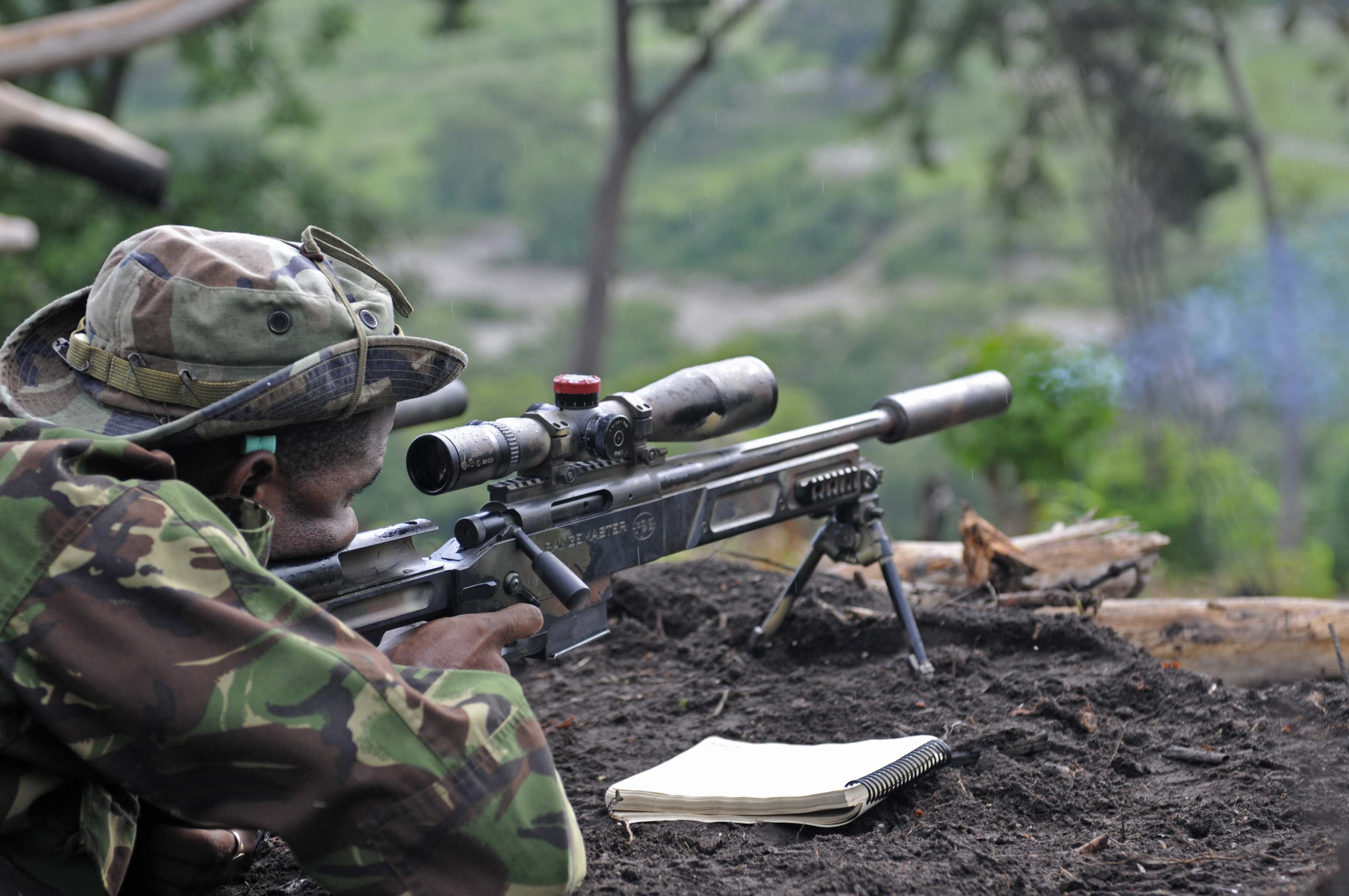
A Brazilian sniper firing his RPA Rangemaster rifle during the 2011 Fuerzas Comando contest.

AFEUR and associated AFEAU units have won the US-sponsored "Fuerzas Comando" (Commando Forces) contest nine times, in 2005, 2006, 2007, 2008, 2012, 2014, 2015, and 2016.

This yearly contest is sponsored by the US South Command and the US Special Operations Command, and is attended by similar teams from Argentina, Bolivia, Chile, Costa Rica, Ecuador, El Salvador, US, Guatemala, Honduras, Jamaica, Nicaragua, Panama, Paraguay, Dominican Republic, Peru and Uruguay.
