= Bolívar, Santander =

Coordinates: 5°59′28″N 73°46′26″W

Bolívar
- Municipality and town
- Flag

- Location of the municipality and town of Bolívar in the Santander Department of Colombia.
- Country: Colombia
- Department: Santander Department

Area
  - Total: 1,419 km^{2} (548 sq mi)

Population (Census 2018)
  - Total: 9,567
  - Density: 6.742/km^{2} (17.46/sq mi)
- Time zone: UTC-5 (Colombia Standard Time)
- Climate: Cfb

Bolívar is a town and municipality in the Santander Department in northeastern Colombia.

== Climate ==
Bolívar has a subtropical highland climate (Köppen Cfb) with heavy rainfall year round.

Climate data for Bolívar
Month	Jan	Feb	Mar	Apr	May	Jun	Jul	Aug	Sep	Oct	Nov	Dec	Year
Mean daily maximum °C (°F)	22.2 (72.0)	22.4 (72.3)	22.4 (72.3)	21.9 (71.4)	21.6 (70.9)	21.4 (70.5)	21.7 (71.1)	21.7 (71.1)	21.7 (71.1)	21.2 (70.2)	21.4 (70.5)	21.7 (71.1)	21.8 (71.2)
Daily mean °C (°F)	16.5 (61.7)	16.8 (62.2)	17.0 (62.6)	17.1 (62.8)	17.0 (62.6)	16.6 (61.9)	16.4 (61.5)	16.4 (61.5)	16.5 (61.7)	16.5 (61.7)	16.6 (61.9)	16.4 (61.5)	16.7 (62.0)
Mean daily minimum °C (°F)	10.8 (51.4)	11.3 (52.3)	11.7 (53.1)	12.3 (54.1)	12.4 (54.3)	11.8 (53.2)	11.1 (52.0)	11.1 (52.0)	11.4 (52.5)	11.9 (53.4)	11.9 (53.4)	11.1 (52.0)	11.6 (52.8)
Average rainfall mm (inches)	66.8 (2.63)	96.1 (3.78)	148.4 (5.84)	277.0 (10.91)	329.6 (12.98)	222.1 (8.74)	204.5 (8.05)	220.0 (8.66)	278.8 (10.98)	292.8 (11.53)	207.5 (8.17)	98.9 (3.89)	2,442.5 (96.16)
Average rainy days	10	12	15	22	23	18	18	18	20	23	19	13	211
Source 1: Instituto de Hidrologia Meteorologia y Estudios Ambientales
Source 2:
