= Corinto, Cauca =

Coordinates: 3°10′26″N 76°15′34″W

- Municipality and town
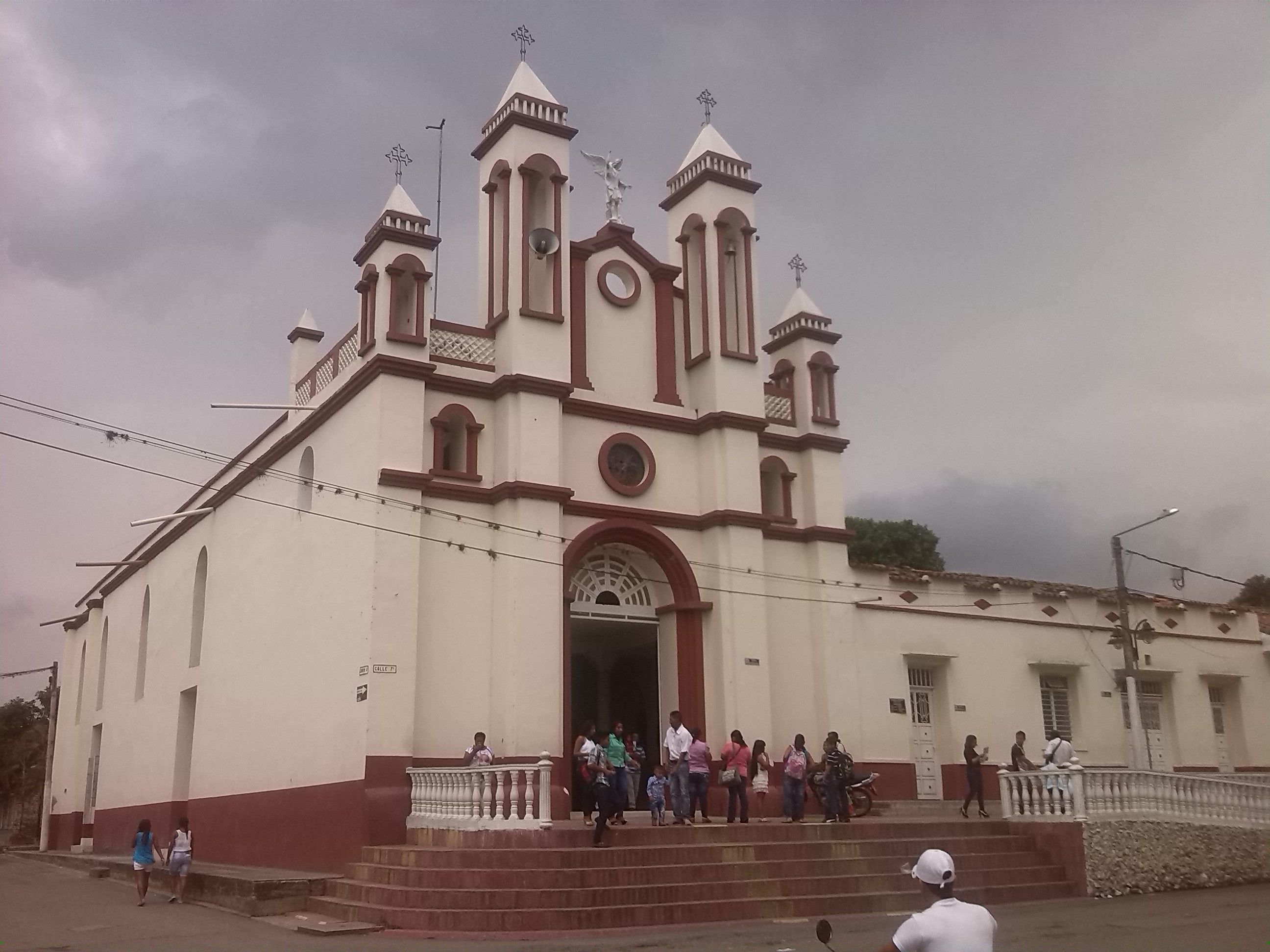
- Church of Corinto

- Flag Coat of arms

- Location of the municipality and town of Corinto, Cauca in the Cauca Department of Colombia.
- Country: Colombia
- Department: Cauca Department

Population (2020 est.)
  - Total: 33,846
- Time zone: UTC-5 (Colombia Standard Time)
- Climate: Am

Corinto is a town and municipality in the Cauca Department, Colombia.

Yordan Guetio of Corinto, a social activist, was murdered on February 2, 2021. He was the twentieth such human rights activist murdered, along with five massacres and one signer of a peace agreement who is missing as of this date in 2021.

A car bomb exploded on March 27, 2021, injuring eleven.
