= Carlos Toledo Plata =

Colombian philanthropist

Carlos Francisco Toledo Plata

Member of the Colombian Chamber of Representatives
- Constituency: Santander

Personal details
- Born: December 13, 1932 Zapatoca, Santander, Colombia
- Died: August 10, 1984 (aged 51) Bucaramanga, Santander, Colombia
- Party: National Popular Alliance
- Education: University of Buenos Aires
- Occupation: Politician, rebel fighter
- Profession: Traumatologist

Military service
- Allegiance: 19th of April Movement
- Years of service: 1970-1982
- Rank: Commander
- Battles/wars: Colombian armed conflict

Carlos Francisco Toledo Plata (December 13, 1932 – August 10, 1984) was a Colombian doctor, politician, co-founder and early leader of the guerrilla movement known as M-19, who also laid the basis for the movement's socialist platforms with his Marxist ideologies. He was also a Member of the Colombian Chamber of Representatives for the electoral constituency of Santander and part of the National Popular Alliance party.

In 1952 Toledo Plata moved to Argentina to study Traumatology. It was there that he became familiar with Peronism, which influenced his political outlook from then on, and where he trained with the Argentinian leftist group Montoneros.

== Capture ==
After being persecuted by the Colombian Military in an attack that forced his unit to disperse, Toledo then managed to flee to Ecuador with the help of the Spanish reporter María Martín using a fake Spanish passport. Once in Ecuador, he tried to apply for political asylum, but was instead detained and handed over to the Colombian authorities. Once in Colombian custody he was imprisoned in La Picota, Toledo and fellow fighter Álvaro Fayad Delgado, were granted amnesty from the Government of President Belisario Betancur in 1982, and Toledo was able to return to civil life.

== Death ==
He was assassinated on August 10, 1984, in a surprise attack by two men on a motorcycle who met him just outside his home in the early hours of the morning, and shot him five times. The incident caused great tensions in the country, as it happened days before the signing of a Peace Accord between the Government and the M-19. The M-19 alluded the attack to the Military as a revenge killing for an attack on the Military the previous week by the M-19. The Government alluded the attack to other guerrilla groups, and those who were against the Peace Process. In retaliation, the M-19 commanded by Rosemberg Pabón launched a siege on the city on Yumbo, where they burned the office of the Mayor, and tried but failed to capture the police headquarters

Although his death was a grave blow to the accord, the Government and the M-19 agreed to go ahead and sign the treaty, and even accelerated the event to prevent any complications.
