= Jaime Bateman Cayón =

Colombian guerrilla leader (1940–1983)

Jaime Bateman Cayon
- Born: Jaime Alfonso Bateman Cayón; April 23, 1940; Santa Marta, Colombia
- Died: April 28, 1983 (aged 43); San Blas, Panama

Jaime Alfonso Bateman Cayón (23 April 1940– 28 April 1983), also known as "El flaco" (the skinny one) or Comandante Pablo (Commander Pablo) by his fellow guerrilleros, was a Colombian guerrilla leader and both founder and commander of the 19th of April guerrilla movement.

== Early years ==
Bateman grew up in an environment of social movements, his mother Clementina Cayón was an advocate of political prisoner and militant in the Liberal Revolutionary Movement (MRL) a dissident group from the Colombian Liberal Party. Bateman was raised mostly by his stepfather Jorge Olarte. Bateman was born in Santa Marta in the Caribbean region northern Colombia among colonial Spanish houses. At the age of eight he was run over by a bus while crossing a street in Barranquilla fracturing his tibia and fibula. He almost lost his leg in this incident and left him with a defect in his leg. He swam for therapy.

=== Communist youth ===
Years later he met Carlos Romero who was arriving from Argentina, where he had been an active militant in the Communist Party of Argentina during the presidency of Juan Domingo Perón. Romero influenced Bateman and convinced him to join the Colombian Communist Youth (JUCO) and form the first group of communists in the Colombian state of Magdalena.

In 1957, while a student at the Liceo Celedón, civic strikes broke out throughout Colombia to protest the dictatorship of Gustavo Rojas Pinilla. These strikes were organized by the two main political parties, the Liberal and Conservative parties. Bateman participated in the marches and became a student activist.

Carlos Romero then married Bateman's sister, Matilde, and Bateman traveled with them to the capital city Bogotá. In Bogotá, he went to high school at the Colegio Panamericano while still participating in the JUCO. In 1963 Bateman was arrested for a month for distributing subversive propaganda and was later arrested again for participating in a protest related to the high cost of living. He became political secretary of the National Secretariat of the Young Communists and participated in 1963 as a delegate for the organization in the 16th Komsomol Congress in Moscow where he received a course in social sciences and criticized the dogmatic study that characterized the school of squares.

== Guerrilla militant ==
Influenced by the Cuban Revolution and Maoism, communists in Colombia began to conceive armed struggle as the only way to seize power. In 1966 Communist party followers split after following different communist tendencies. Some of these joined the Revolutionary Armed Forces of Colombia, which the communist party supported. Because he was a communist, Bateman began being persecuted by Colombian government forces. He became the personal secretary of Manuel Marulanda Vélez, Jacobo Arenas and Ciro Trujillo performing political duties for the Revolutionary Armed Forces of Colombia (FARC) until he left in 1970. The FARC wanted to achieve power through political struggle and by empowering the peasants while Bateman and his followers wanted to take the cities and believed that the armed and political struggle should be focused on nationalism, Bolivarianism and American-centrist.

== 19th of April Movement ==
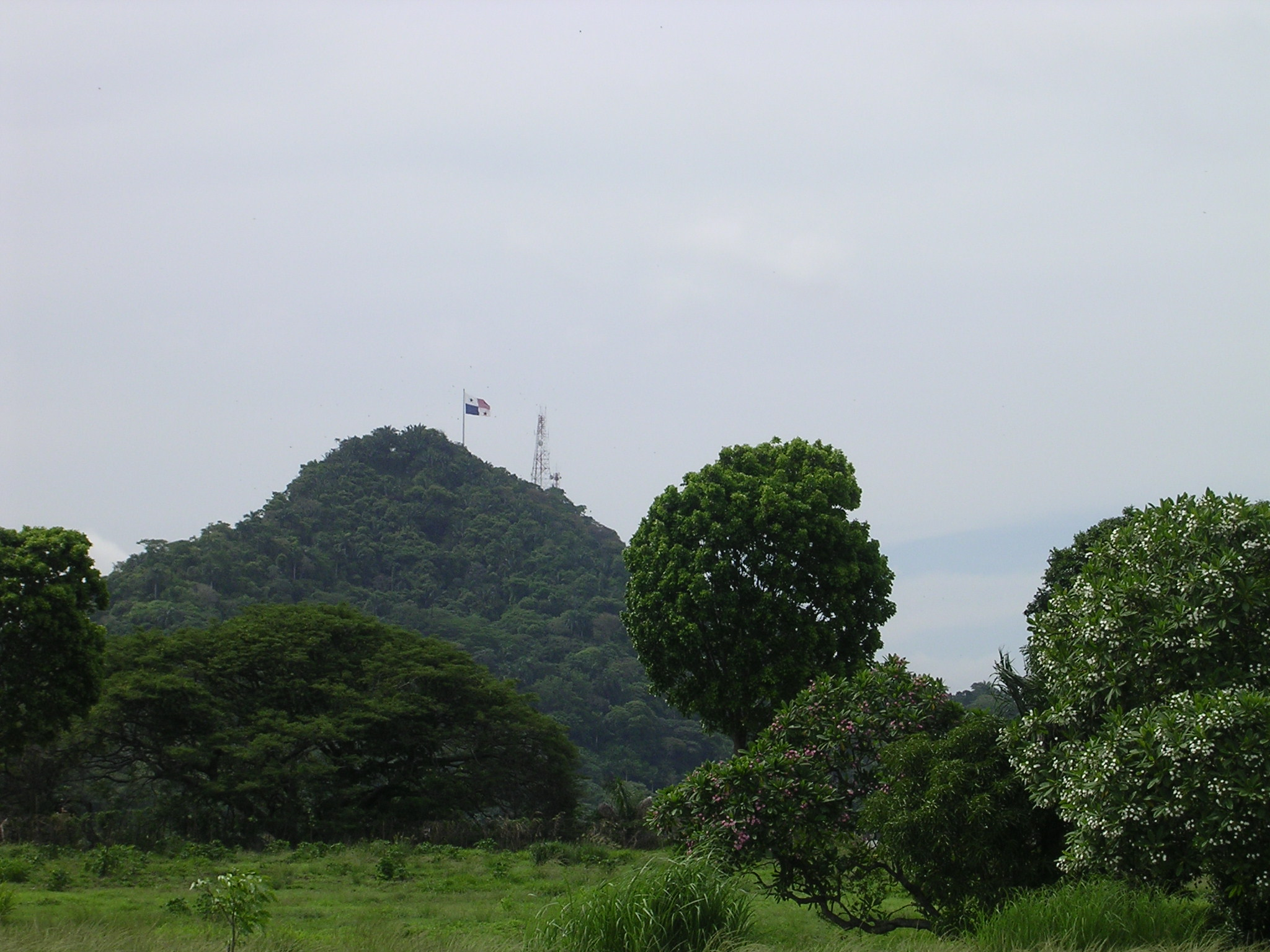
Jaime Bateman died in a plane crash near Ancon Hill, Panama (1983). In the remains of the airplane HK-2139P also was found the corpse of Colombian congressman Antonio Escobar Bravo

After coming to these beliefs Bateman developed an urban political and military movement in 1970 along with Carlos Toledo Plata, the main leader of the Socialist ANAPO. After the dubious elections of April 19, 1970, in which conservative candidate Misael Pastrana Borrero won over the ANAPO candidate and former dictator Gustavo Rojas Pinilla, Bateman launched the 19th of April Movement with the banner: "With the arms, with the people, with María Eugenia Rojas to the power", however the Directorate of the ANAPO denied such support for armed groups.

The group recruited numerous guerrilla fighters and began targeting government and military objectives. In 1974 the M-19 stole from the Quinta de Bolívar the sword of Simón Bolívar, threatening not to return it until peace was achieved in Colombia. Bateman also ordered the robbery of some five thousand weapons from a military garrison in Bogotá known as the Canton Norte on January 6, 1981.

He also ordered the Dominican embassy siege during which he proposed an amnesty for political prisoners held in La Picota prison and dialogues to start formal peace talks. Then Senator Germán Bula Hoyos and who proposed the law to give amnesty to political prisoners was the first government official to meet him in person.

In December 1981, Bateman demanded to be put on the presidential ballot, but President Turbay rejected the proposal. Bateman announced that "if there are no elections for everyone, there will be no elections for anyone." This prompted the government to send troops into the cities during the 1982 presidential election.

== Death ==
Bateman died on April 28, 1983, in a plane crash while en route to Panama. His body was not found for 9 months.
