= 19th of April Movement =

Left-wing guerilla movement in Colombia (1974–1990)

- Movimiento 19 de Abril
- Flag and logo of the M-19.
- Leaders: Jaime Bateman Cayón # (17 January 1974 – 28 April 1983); Iván Marino Ospina † (28 April 1983 – 28 August 1985); Álvaro Fayad † (28 August 1985 – 13 March 1986); Carlos Pizarro Leongómez (13 March 1986 – 8 March 1990); Carlos Toledo Plata
- Dates active: 17 January 1974 – 8 March 1990 (16 years, 50 days)
- Country: Colombia
- Headquarters: Cauca; Caquetá; Nariño; Valle del Cauca; Quindío
- Active regions: Concentrated in southern and central Colombia
- Ideology: Bolivarianism; Left-wing nationalism Revolutionary socialism Democratic socialism
- Political position: Far-left
- Size: 3,500 (1984)
- Part of: Simón Bolívar Guerrilla Coordinating Board
- Wars: Colombian armed conflict

The 19th of April Movement (Spanish: Movimiento 19 de Abril), or M-19, was a Colombian urban guerrilla movement active in the late 1970s and 1980s. After its demobilization in 1990, it became a political party, the M-19 Democratic Alliance (Alianza Democrática M-19), or AD/M-19.

The M-19 traced its origins to the allegedly fraudulent presidential elections of 19 April 1970, where the left-wing populist National Popular Alliance (ANAPO) of former military dictator Gustavo Rojas Pinilla was defeated by the National Front, a power sharing coalition of the two main establishment parties. M-19 initially proclaimed itself the armed wing of ANAPO, though party leaders denied any association.

The ideology of the M-19 was revolutionary nationalism and democratic socialism, but it claimed its main aim was to open up electoral democracy in Colombia. It was inspired by other South American urban guerrilla groups, such as the Tupamaros in Uruguay and the Montoneros in Argentina. At its height in the mid-1980s, the M-19 was the second largest guerrilla group in Colombia (after the FARC), with the number of active members estimated at between 1,500 and 2,000. Its actions during this period included the theft of Bolívar's sword as well as the Palace of Justice siege. M-19 had 30% women among its members.

The group demobilized in the late 1980s and transitioned to electoral politics, though many of its key leaders would be assassinated by government agents and right-wing paramilitary groups. The M-19 Democratic Alliance merged with ANAPO in 2003 to form the Independent Democratic Pole party, the predecessor of today's Alternative Democratic Pole. Other former members joined various left-wing parties, including the Green Alliance and Humane Colombia, the latter formed by ex-member Gustavo Petro. Petro would go on to unite these parties in his Pacto Histórico coalition, which won the 2022 elections to form Colombia's current governing coalition.

== Armed activity ==
The M-19's history may be divided into two parts: the first was a failed armed revolutionary struggle during the early to mid-1980s, while the second was a relatively constructive reincorporation into civil society and political life during the late 1980s and early 1990s.

=== Theft of Bolívar's sword ===
Among the actions performed by the M-19, some significant events stand out. In a highly symbolic action, the M-19 stole one of the swords of Simón Bolívar from the Quinta de Bolívar museum in 1974, an event which was used by the group to symbolize what they called a civilian uprising against a regime perceived as unjust. M-19 promised to return the sword by 18 December 1990, the 160th anniversary of Bolívar's death. But the organization was unable to keep its pledge and was forced to admit it was no longer in possession of the sword. However, in 1991, M-19 would eventually return the sword.

=== Kidnapping and murder of José Raquel Mercado ===
On 15 February 1976, the M-19 kidnapped the union leader Jose Raquel Mercado, who was the president of Confederation of Workers of Colombia (CTC), charged him with selling out the interests of Colombian workers to U.S. imperialism, and sentenced him to death. The group accused Mercado of taking bribes and collaborating with the Central Intelligence Agency (CIA). The M-19 had offered to "commute" the labor leader's death sentence if the government reinstated thousands of fired workers, gave public employees the right to strike and published a communique in 12 Colombian newspapers. Mercado's body was wrapped in plastic, and propped up against a lamppost in a Bogota park.

=== Theft of arms from the north canton ===
On New Year's Eve 1979, the group dug a tunnel into a Colombian Army weapons depot, taking over 5000 weapons. It was considered one of the first signs of the group's true potential for armed action. The army’s repression is fierce. It kidnaps, tortures, and kills large numbers of movement members, as well as their families and supporters.

=== Dominican Republic embassy siege ===
The group is also recognized for other high-profile activities, such as the Dominican embassy siege. The guerrillas stormed the Dominican Republic's embassy during a cocktail party on 27 February 1980. They took the largest recorded number of diplomats held hostage to date in Colombia, which accounted for 14 ambassadors, including the United States'. Eventually, after tense negotiations with the government of Julio César Turbay Ayala, the hostages were peacefully released and the hostage takers were allowed to leave the country for exile in Cuba. Some of them later returned and actively rejoined the M-19's activities. Many contemporary rumors and later accounts from the participants in this event have suggested that the Colombian government might have submitted to another of the M-19 demands, by allegedly giving the group 1 to 2.5 million U.S. dollars in exchange for the release of the hostages.

=== Kidnapping and Murder of Chester "Chet" Bitterman ===
In 1979, Chester "Chet" Bitterman traveled with his wife to Colombia to begin mission work with Wycliffe with the Summer Institute of Linguistics (SIL), an organization dedicated to documenting lesser known-languages in order to create translations of the Christian Bible. On January 19, 1981, Bitterman was taken hostage by M-19.

M-19 accused SIL of working with the CIA to destroy indigenous cultures, violate Colombian sovereignty and loot the country's resources and demanded SIL withdraw all 209 of its people from Colombia, or they would kill Bitterman. After SIL's refusal to yield to the demands, Bitterman was found murdered.

=== First peace talks ===
During the government of Belisario Betancur (1982–1986), Jaime Bateman Cayón, by then top leader of the M-19, proposed a meeting in Panama with the Colombian government toward solving the conflict. But Bateman died on 28 April 1983 in an airplane accident, apparently while on the way to Panama, and the negotiations were suspended.

The negotiations culminated with the Agreements of Corinto, Cauca. A ceasefire was agreed, as well as the continuation of dialogue for the future demobilization of the guerrilla detachment. Nevertheless, sectors of the army opposed to the agreements of La Uribe and Corinto were responsible for attacks against the life of main leaders Iván Marino Ospina, Antonio Navarro Wolff, Carlos Pizarro, Marcos Chalita, etc.

=== Palace of Justice siege ===
The M-19 initiated the events leading to the Palace of Justice siege. In this attack, on 6 November 1985, some 300 lawyers, judges, and Supreme Court magistrates were taken hostage by 35 armed rebel commandos at the Palace of Justice, the building that houses the Supreme Court of Colombia. They demanded that president Belisario Betancur be tried by the magistrates for allegedly betraying the country's desire for peace. When this situation became publicly known, the Colombian Army surrounded the Palace of Justice's perimeter with soldiers and EE-9 Cascavel armored reconnaissance vehicles. Initially, the military attempted to negotiate with the hostage takers, but these efforts was ultimately unsuccessful, despite the desperate pleas of some of the more prominent hostages.

The Betancur administration and its council found themselves in a difficult position. They were not willing to submit to the rebels' demands, as they allegedly believed that this would set a worrying precedent and considerably jeopardize the government's position. Eventually, after tense discussions, it was decided during an emergency meeting that the military would be allowed to handle the situation and attempt to recover the Palace by force.

During the military assault, Supreme Court President Alfonso Reyes Echandia was able to contact a Bogota radio station via telephone, during which he begged the authorities to agree to "a ceasefire and dialogue with the rebels." President Belisario Betancur refused to call off the siege. The building caught fire and ultimately more than 100 people died (including 11 of the country's 21 Supreme Court Justices), and valuable legal records were destroyed.

The M-19 lost several of its top commanders during the event. The Inter-American Court of Human Rights said in a 2014 ruling the Colombian state was responsible for forced disappearances, torture and extrajudicial executions during the crisis. In 2015, President Juan Manuel Santos apologized for the Colombian military's role in the deaths of civilian victims killed during its assault.

Citing the court decision, Santos added that he also apologised for violating the right to personal safety of those who were inside the Palace of Justice.

A Special Commission of Inquiry, established by the Betancur government, released a June 1986 report which concluded that Pablo Escobar had no relation with this event, so these allegations could not be proven (though it did not rule out the possibility either). Author Ana Carrigan alleged that the act was a conspiracy of the Colombian government. Others state that the alleged Guerrilla-Cartel relation was unlikely to occur because the two organizations had several standoffs and confrontations, like the kidnapping of Nieves Ochoa, the sister of Medellin cartel founder Juan David Ochoa Vásquez, by M-19. The kidnapping led to the creation of the MAS/Muerte a Secuestradores ("Death to Kidnappers") paramilitary group by the Medellín Cartel. However, her theories and skepticism of Escobar and the Medellin Cartel's involvement was greatly discredited by others such as Rex Hudson, who presented allegedly "overwhelming evidence" linking the cartel to the plot.

Former Assistant of the Colombia Attorney General, National Deputy Comptroller, author and Professor Jose Mauricio Gaona along with former Minister of Justice and Ambassador to the United Kingdom Carlos Medellín Becerra, the sons of two of the murdered Supreme Court magistrates, have pushed for further investigations into the presumed links between the M-19 and the Medellín Cartel. Mayor of Bogota Gustavo Petro, a former M-19 guerrilla, has denied these accusations and dismissed them as based upon the inconsistent testimonies of drug lords. Petro says that the surviving members of the M-19 do admit to their share of responsibility for the tragic events of the siege, on behalf of the entire organization, but deny any links to the drug trade.

== Members ==
- Andrés Almarales
- Jaime Bateman Cayón
- Marcos Chalita
- Álvaro Fayad
- Vera Grabe
- Gustavo Arias Londoño
- Iván Marino Ospina
- Carlos Moreno
- Antonio Navarro Wolf
- Luis Otero Cifuentes
- Rosemberg Pabón
- Gustavo Petro
- Carlos Pizarro Leongómez
- Carlos Toledo Plata

== Demobilization and participation in politics ==
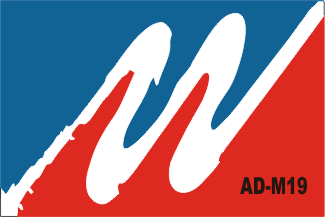
New banner adopted by the Democratic Alliance M-19.

Internationally isolated, M-19 saw itself unable to continue the armed struggle: As late as 1988, an attempt was made to solicit weapons shipments from Socialist East Germany, but, following reservations from the Ministry of National Defense, the Foreign Ministry, and the Ministry for State Security, the request was denied in the end. The M-19 eventually gave up its weapons, received pardons and became a political party in the late 1980s, the M-19 Democratic Alliance ("Alianza Democrática M-19", or (AD/M-19)), which renounced the armed struggle. Eventually the M-19 returned Bolívar's sword as a symbol of its demobilization and desire to change society through its participation in legal politics.

In 1990, one of its more prominent figures, presidential candidate and former guerrilla commander Carlos Pizarro Leongómez, while aboard an airline flight, was murdered by assassins, supposedly on the orders of drug cartel and paramilitary leaders (disappeared AUC commander Carlos Castaño publicly admitted his own responsibility for the murder in a 2002 book and interviews). Some of its other members were also subject to multiple threats or likewise murdered. Antonio Navarro Wolff replaced the deceased Pizarro as candidate and leader of the party, finishing third in that year's presidential race.

Despite the continuation of smaller scale violence against it, the AD/M-19 survived through the 1990s, achieved favorable electoral results on a local level and actively participated as a high-profile political force in the forging of Colombia's modern 1991 constitution, which replaced a conservative document dating from 1886. Antonio Navarro was one of the three co-presidents of the Constituent Assembly of Colombia, together with representatives from the Colombian Liberal Party and the Colombian Conservative Party.

Several analysts consider that the AD/M-19 reached its peak at this point in time and, while never disappearing completely from the political background, it began to gradually decline as a party on its own, although many of its ex-members have gained influence in the Independent Democratic Pole coalition.

== Election results ==
Election year	# of overall votes	% of overall vote	# of overall seats won	+/–	Government
1990	992,613	26.7% #2	19 / 70	▲	
1991	483,382	10.3% #3	13 / 161	▼	
1994	153,185	3.0% #3	1 / 163	▼	
1998	10,722	0.1% #42	0 / 161	▼	
2002	43,293	0.5% #31	0 / 161	▲	

== See also ==
- History of Colombia
- Politics of Colombia
