= History of Colombia =

The history of Colombia includes its settlement by indigenous peoples and the establishment of agrarian societies, notably the Muisca Confederation, Quimbaya Civilization, and Tairona Chiefdoms. The Spanish arrived in 1499 and initiated a period of annexation and colonization, ultimately creating the Viceroyalty of New Granada, with its capital at Bogotá. Independence from Spain was won in 1819, but by 1830 the resulting "Gran Colombia" Federation was dissolved. What is now Colombia and Panama emerged as the Republic of New Granada. The new nation experimented with federalism as the Granadine Confederation (1858) and then the United States of Colombia (1863) before the Republic of Colombia was finally declared in 1886. A period of constant political violence ensued, and Panama seceded in 1903. Since the 1960s, the country has suffered from an asymmetric low-intensity armed conflict which escalated in the 1990s but decreased from 2005 onward. The legacy of Colombia's history has resulted in a rich cultural heritage, and Colombia's geographic and climatic variations have contributed to the development of strong regional identities.

== Pre-Columbian ==
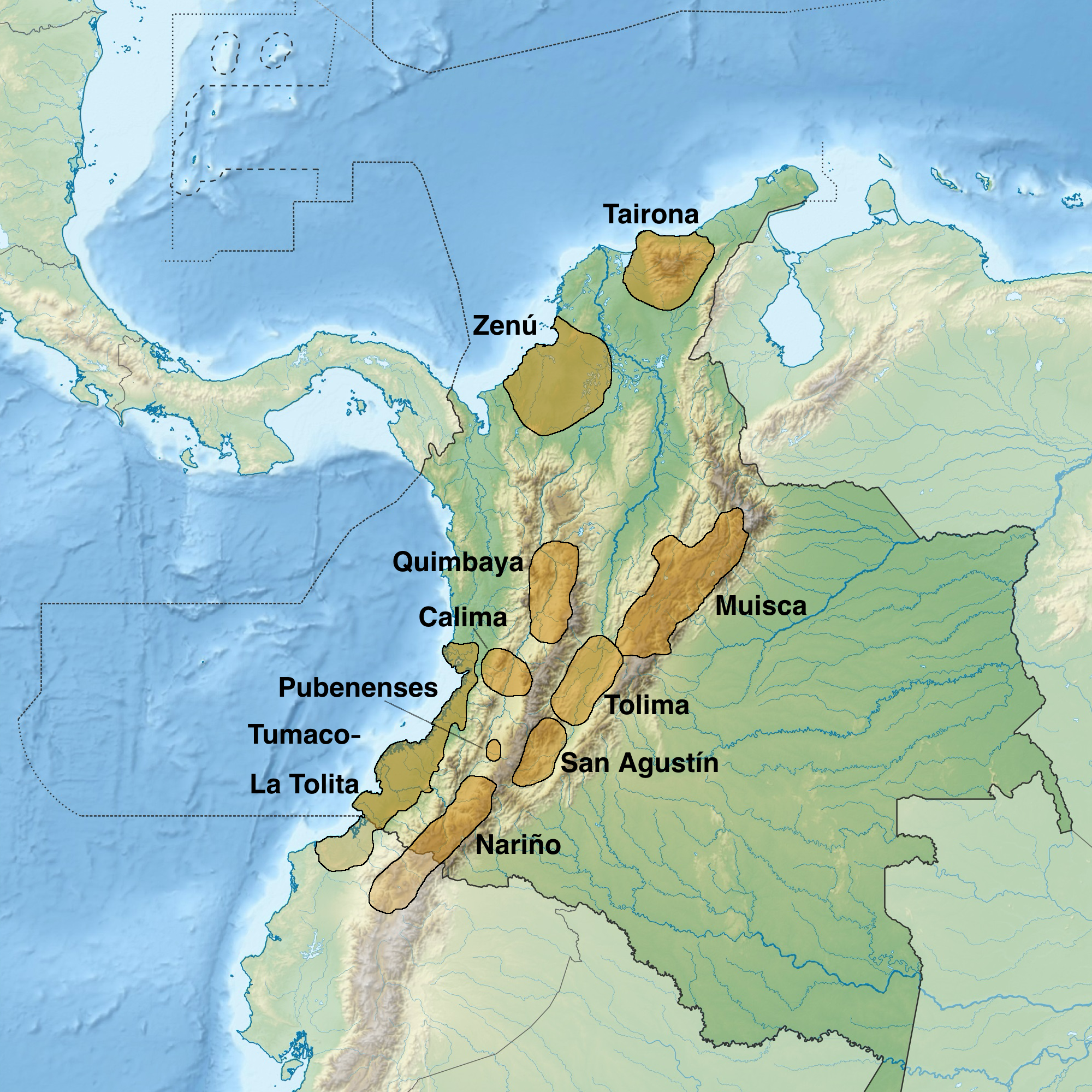
Location map of the pre-Columbian cultures of Colombia

From approximately 12,000 years BP onwards, hunter-gatherer societies existed near present-day Bogotá (at El Abra and Tequendama), and they traded with one another and with cultures living in the Magdalena River valley. Due to its location, the present territory of Colombia was a corridor of early human migration from Mesoamerica and the Caribbean to the Andes and the Amazon basin. The oldest archaeological finds are from the Pubenza archaeological site and El Totumo archaeological site in the Magdalena Valley 100 kilometres (62 mi) southwest of Bogotá. These sites date from the Paleoindian period (18.000–8000 BCE). At Puerto Hormiga archaeological site and other sites, traces from the Archaic period in South America (~8000–2000 BCE) have been found. Vestiges indicate that there was also early occupation in the regions of El Abra, Tibitó and Tequendama in Cundinamarca. The oldest pottery discovered in the Americas, found at the San Jacinto archaeological site, dates to 5000–4000 BCE. Indigenous people inhabited the territory that is now Colombia by 10.500 BCE. Nomadic hunter-gatherer tribes at the El Abra and Tequendama sites near present-day Bogotá traded with one another and with other cultures from the Magdalena River Valley.

Serranía de la Lindosa, a mountainous region of Guaviare Department, is known for an extensive prehistoric rock art site which stretches for nearly eight miles. Some authors have argued that the site depicts now extinct animals such as horses, gomphotheres and ground sloths and that it was painted around 12,600 years ago, but other authors have argued that the drawings depict modern (including domestic) animals and were created in the last 500 years after European contact.

Between 5000 and 1000 BCE, hunter-gatherer tribes transitioned to agrarian societies; fixed settlements were established, and pottery appeared. Beginning in the 1st millennium BCE, groups of Amerindians including the Muisca, Quimbaya, Tairona, Calima, Zenú, Tierradentro, San Agustín, Tolima and Urabá became skilled in farming, mining and metalcraft; and some developed the political system of cacicazgos with a pyramidal structure of power headed by caciques. The Muisca inhabited mainly the area of what is now the Departments of Boyacá and Cundinamarca high plateau (Altiplano Cundiboyacense) where they formed the Muisca Confederation. The Muisca had one of the most developed political systems (Muisca Confederation) in South America, surpassed only by the Incas. They farmed maize, potato, quinoa and cotton, and traded gold, emeralds, blankets, ceramic handicrafts, coca and especially salt with neighboring nations. The Tairona inhabited northern Colombia in the isolated Andes mountain range of Sierra Nevada de Santa Marta. The Quimbaya inhabited regions of the Cauca River Valley between the Western and Central Ranges. The Incas expanded their empire on the southwest part of the country. During the 1200s, Malayo-Polynesians and Native Americans in Colombia made contact, thereby spreading Native American genetics from Precolonial Colombia to some Pacific Ocean islands.

Pre-Columbian

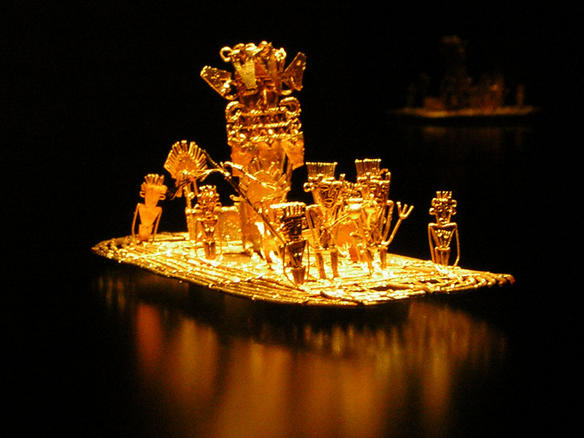
The zipa used to cover his body in gold, and. from his Muisca raft. He offered treasures to the Guatavita goddess in the middle of the sacred lake. This old Muisca tradition became the origin of the El Dorado legend.

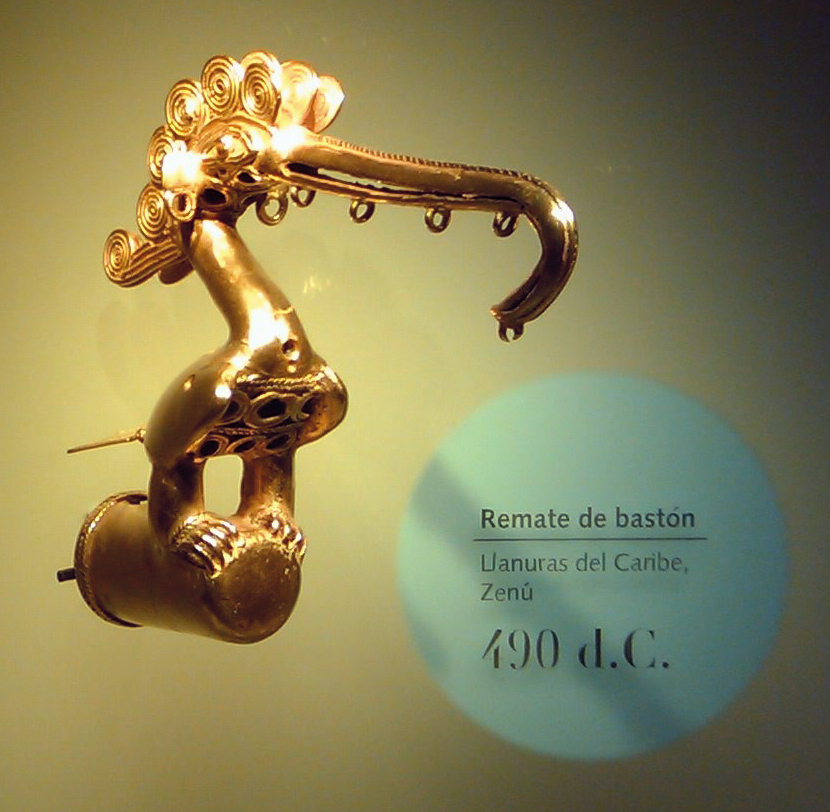
A lowland Zenú cast-gold bird ornament that served as a staff head. dated 490 CE. This culture used alloys with a high gold content. The crest of the bird consists of the typical Zenú semi-filigree. Regular filigree is braided wire, but the Zenú cast theirs.

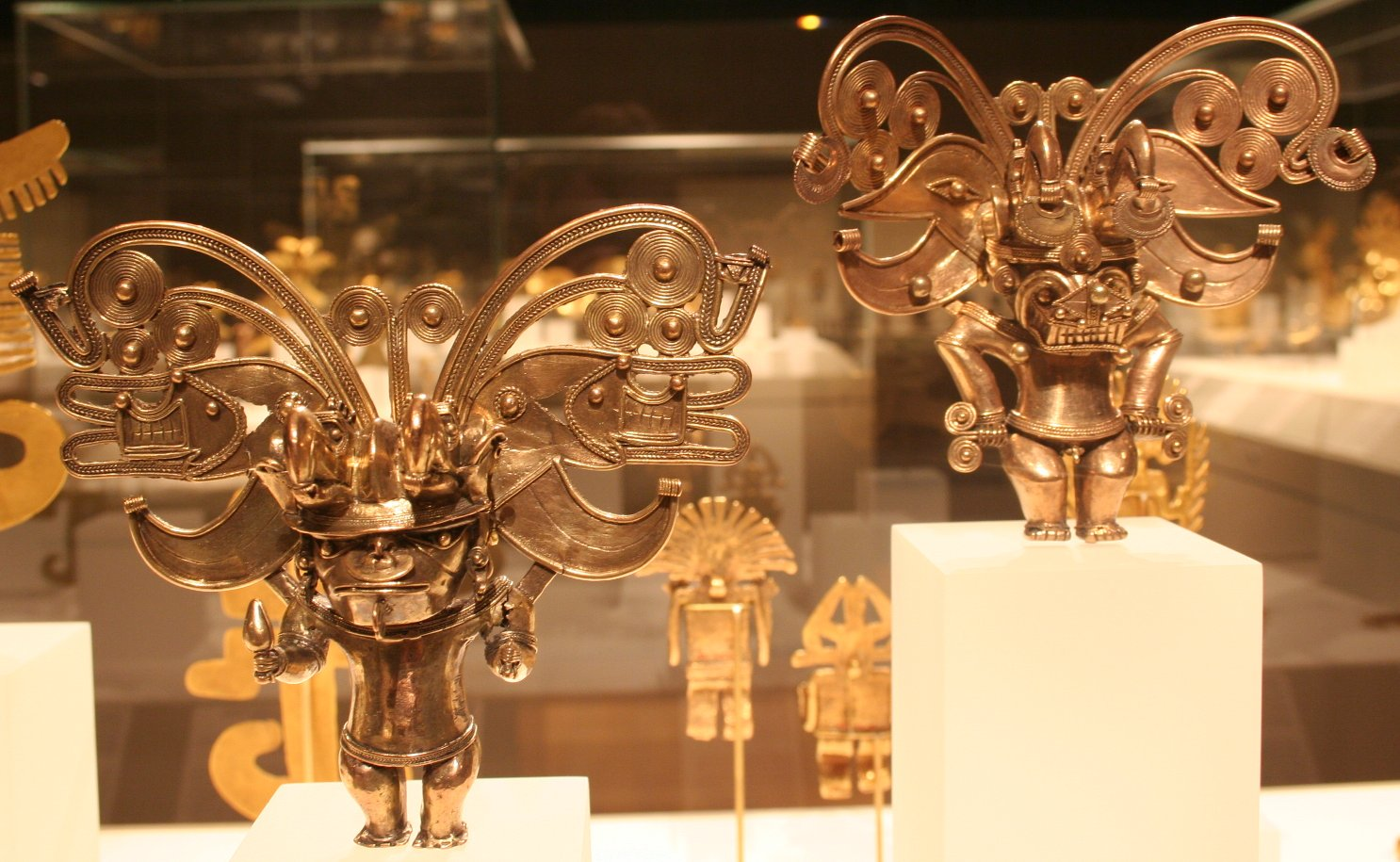
Tairona figure pendants in gold

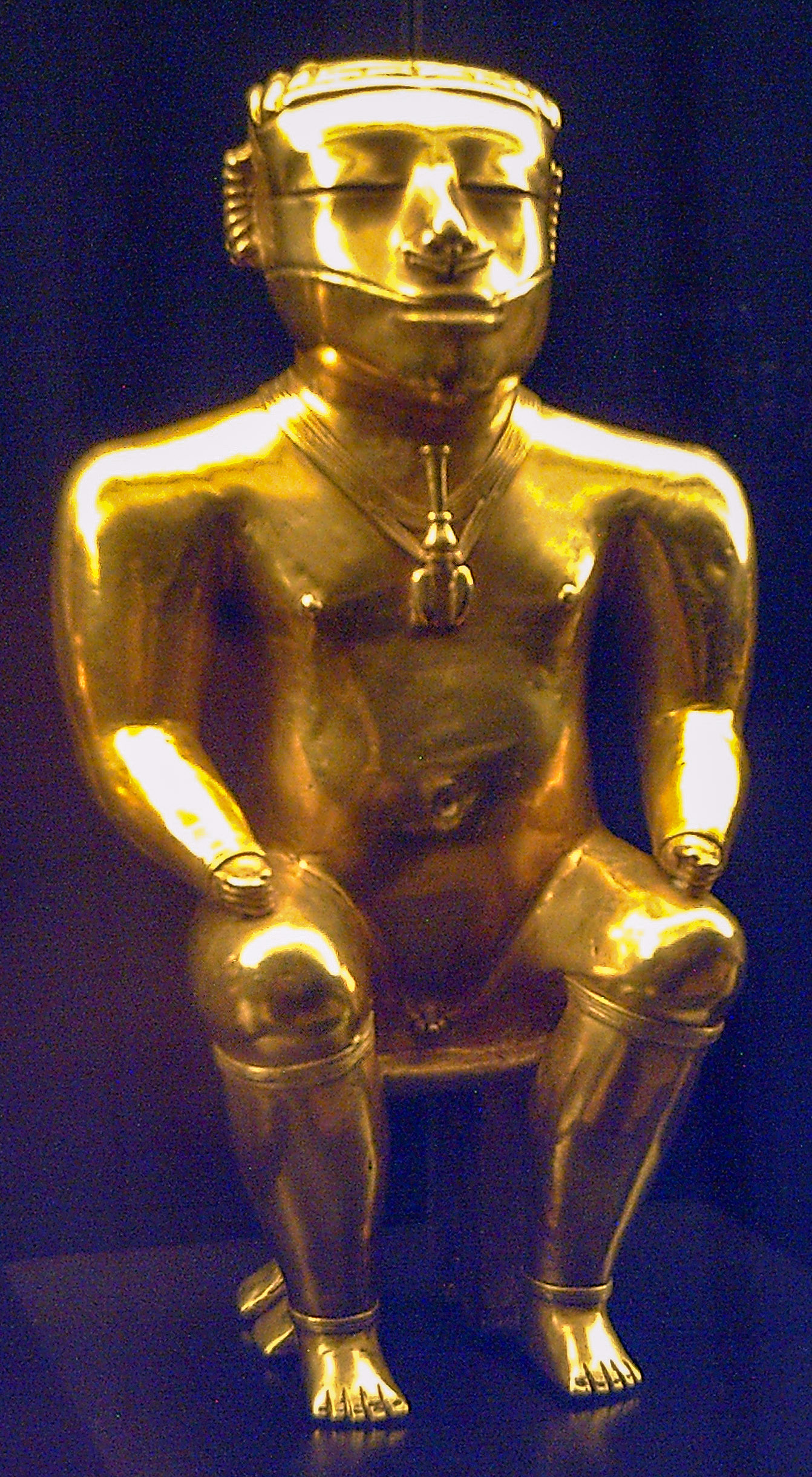
Golden statuette of a Quimbaya cacique

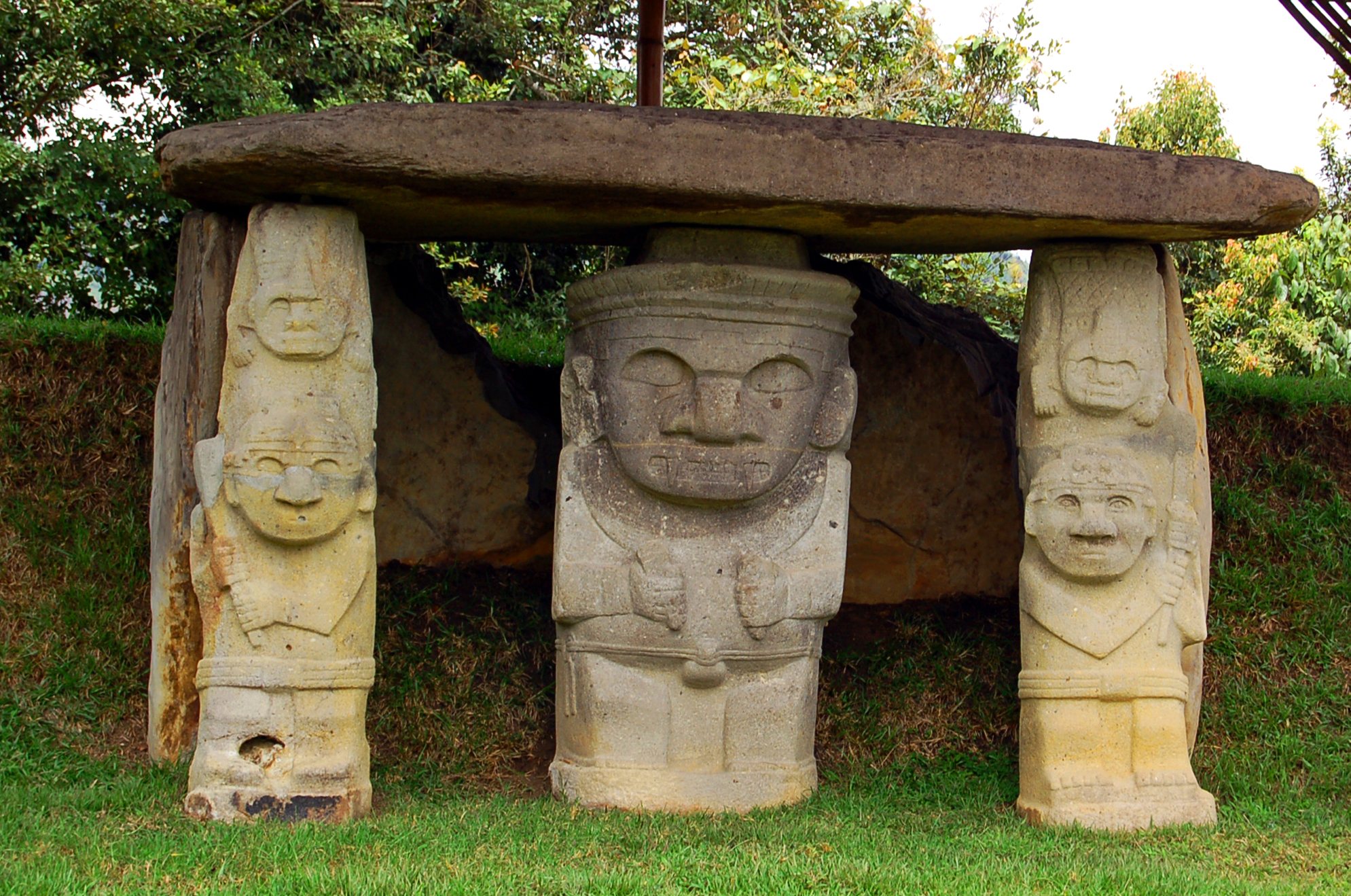
San Agustín Archaeological Park (UNESCO World Heritage Site) contains the largest collection of religious monuments and megalithic sculptures in Latin America, and is considered the world's largest necropolis.

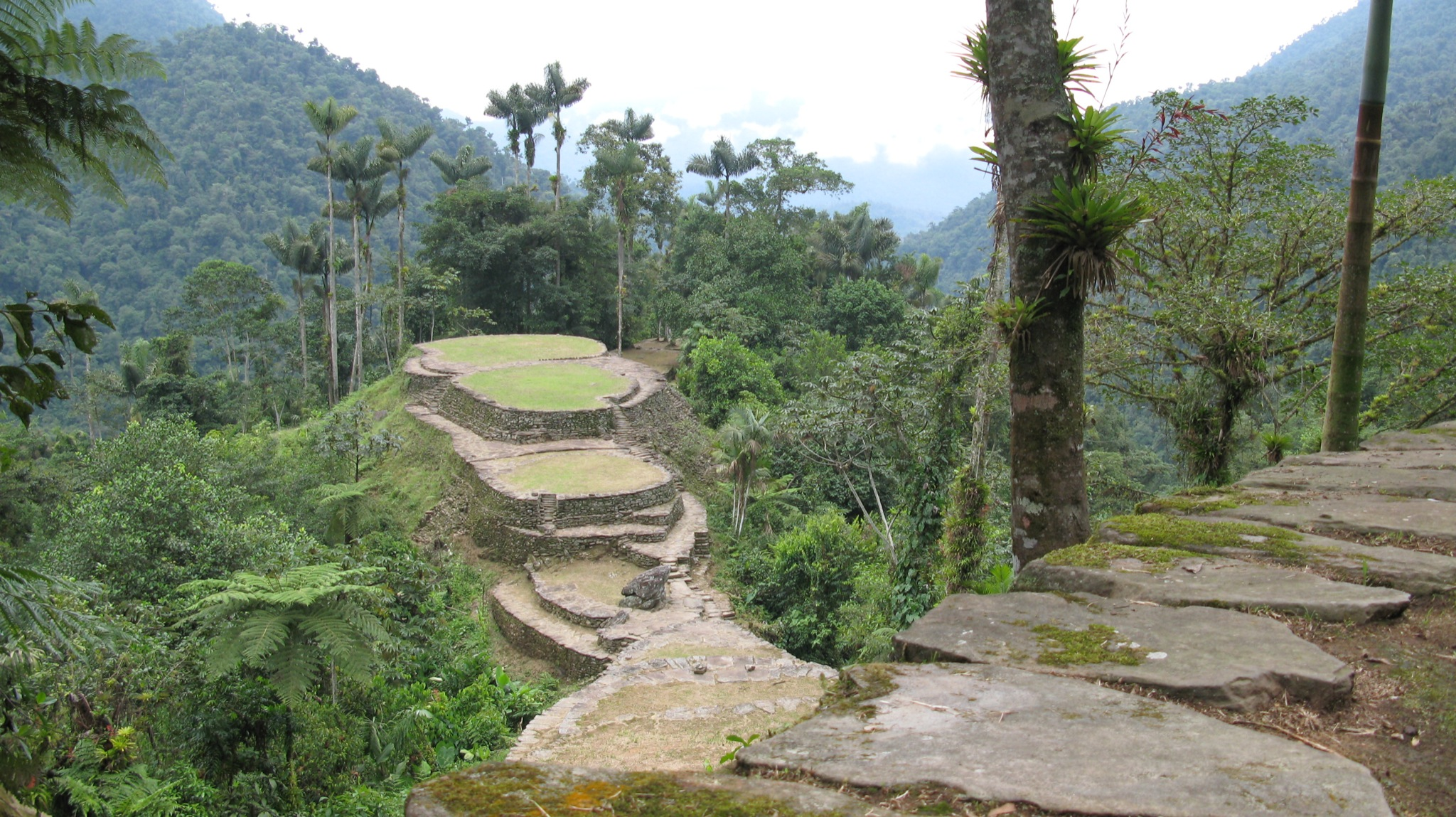
Ciudad Perdida is a major settlement believed to have been founded around 800 CE. It consists of a series of 169 terraces carved into the mountainside, a net of tiled roads and several small circular plazas. The entrance can only be accessed by a climb up some 1,200 stone steps through dense jungle.

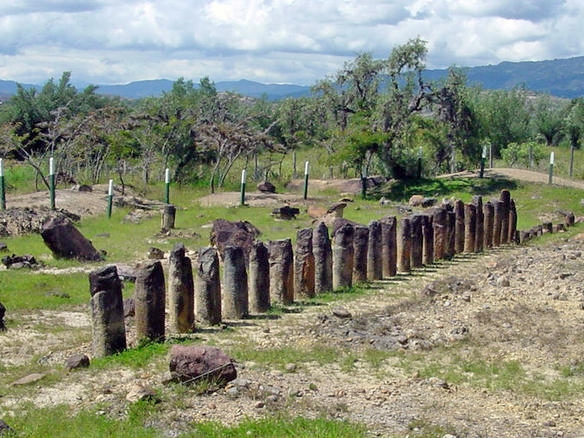
El Infiernito, a pre-Columbian archaeoastronomical site located on the Altiplano Cundiboyacense in the outskirts of Villa de Leyva

== Colonial period ==
=== Pre-Columbian history ===
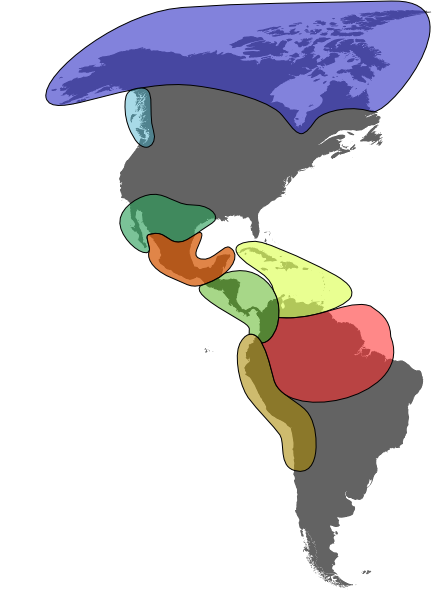
Major areas of pre-Columbian civilization in the Americas: Arctic Northwest Aridoamerica Mesoamerica Isthmo-Colombian Caribbean Amazon Andes

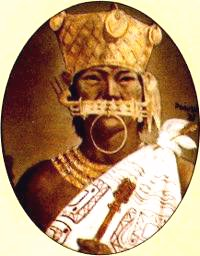
The main leader of the Muisca on the Bogotá savanna at the time of conquest was Tisquesusa. He led numerous efforts to resist the Spanish invasion but was eventually killed in battle. His nephew, Sagipa, succeeded him and soon submitted to the conquistadors.

Europeans first visited the territory that became Colombia in 1499 when the first expedition of Alonso de Ojeda arrived at the Cabo de la Vela. The Spanish made several attempts to settle along the north coast of today's Colombia in the early 16th century, but their first permanent settlement, at Santa Marta, dates from 1525. The Spanish commander Pedro de Heredia founded Cartagena on June 1, 1533, in the former location of the indigenous Caribbean Calamarí village. Cartagena grew rapidly, fueled first by the gold in the tombs of the Sinú culture, and later by trade. The thirst for gold and land lured Spanish explorers to visit Chibchan-speaking areas; resulting in the Spanish conquest of the Chibchan Nations - the conquest by the Spanish monarchy of the Chibcha language-speaking nations, mainly the Muisca and Tairona who inhabited present-day Colombia, beginning the Spanish colonization of the Americas.

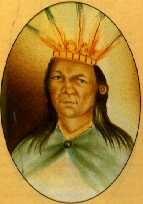
Quemuenchatocha
(† 1537)

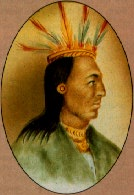
Aquiminzaque
(† 1539)

Aquiminzaque, as successor of Quemuenchatocha, defeated in his home in Hunza, on August 20, 1537, was the last sovereign ruler of the Muisca and was decapitated by the Spanish, as would happen to Túpac Amaru of the Inca, 34 years later.

The Spanish advance inland from the Caribbean coast began independently from three different directions, under Jimenéz de Quesáda, Sebastián de Benalcázar (known in Colombia as Belalcázar), and Nikolaus Federmann. Although the Indian treasures drew all three, none intended to reach the Muisca territory where they finally met. In August 1538, Quesáda founded Santa Fe de Bogotá on the site of the Muisca village of Bacatá.

In 1549, the institution of the Spanish Royal Audiencia in Bogotá gave that city the status of capital of New Granada, which comprised in large part what is now the territory of Colombia. As early as the 1500s, however, secret anti-Spanish discontentment was already brewing for Colombians since Spain prohibited direct trade between the Viceroyalty of Peru, which included Colombia, and the Viceroyalty of New Spain, which included the Philippines, the source of Asian products like silk and porcelain which was in demand in the Americas. Illegal trade between Peruvians, Filipinos, and Mexicans continued in secret, as smuggled Asian goods ended up in Córdoba, Colombia, the distribution center for illegal Asian imports, due to the collusion between these peoples against the authorities in Spain. They settled and traded with each other while disobeying the forced Spanish monopoly in more expensive silks and porcelain made in homeland Spain. In 1717, the Viceroyalty of New Granada was originally created, and then it was temporarily removed, to finally be reestablished in 1739. Felipe Salonga a rebel Filipino who mixed Christianity with Islam and was from the formerly Muslim kingdom Manila and who was implicated in the Tondo Conspiracy, was presumably exiled to the location of what is now the Viceroyalty of New Granada (Named after a formerly Islamic kingdom in Spain) in the Viceroyalty of Nueva Granada he fomented opposition against Spain among the oppressed Native Americas. The viceroyalty had Santa Fé de Bogotá as its capital. This viceroyalty included some other provinces of northwestern South America which had previously been under the jurisdiction of the viceroyalties of New Spain or Peru and correspond mainly to today's Venezuela, Ecuador and Panama. Bogotá became one of the principal administrative centers of the Spanish possessions in the New World, along with Lima and Mexico City.

== Gran Colombia: independence re-claimed ==
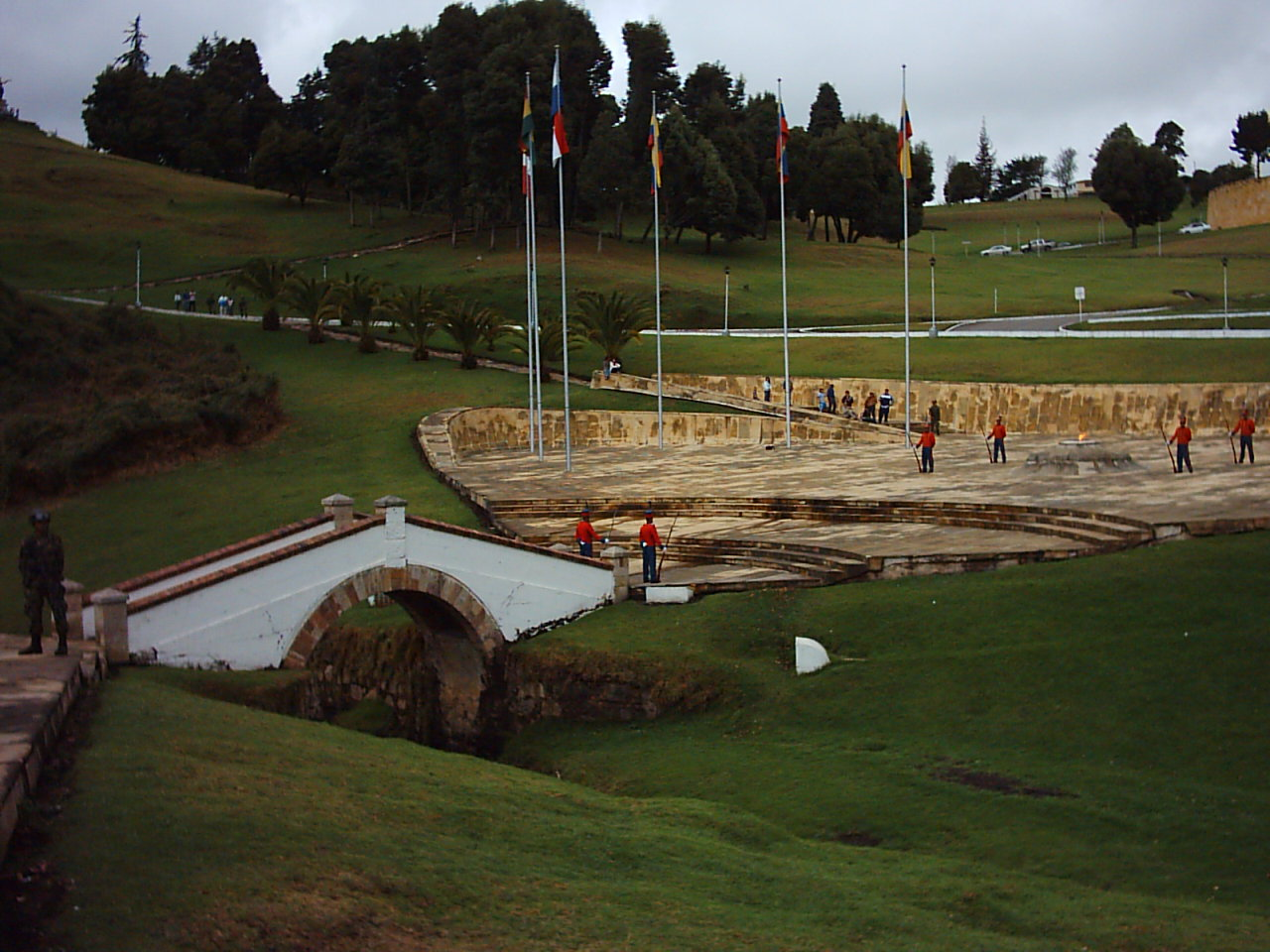
The Boyaca bridge was crucial in the Battle of Boyacá.

From then on, the long independence struggle was led mainly by Bolívar and Francisco de Paula Santander in neighboring Venezuela. Bolívar returned to New Granada only in 1819 after establishing himself as leader of the pro-independence forces in the Venezuelan llanos. From there he led an army over the Andes and captured New Granada after a quick campaign that ended at the Battle of Boyacá on August 7, 1819. (For more information. see Military career of Simón Bolívar.)

That year, the Congress of Angostura established the Republic of Gran Colombia, which included all territories under the jurisdiction of the former Viceroyalty of New Granada. Bolívar was elected the first president of Gran Colombia and Santander, vice president.

Starting from 1821, Colombia implemented a large-scale land reform, the oldest program of this kind in Latin America. Its aim was to transfer agricultural land to poor peasants and people without land.

As the Federation of Gran Colombia was dissolved in 1830, the Department of Cundinamarca (as established in Angostura) became a new country, the Republic of New Granada.

Colombia was the first nation in the Andean area to believe that racial inferiority was the cause of many of its initial problems. Criollos in the country believed that non-white citizens, mainly Indians and Africans, were lazy and holding the nation back. This led to an attempt to make a homogenous society that reflected the so-called good qualities of white people. These ideals led to a long-lasting racial and geographical segregation.

However, Colombia demonstrated a notable commitment to civil rights during the nineteenth century. The Colombian Constitution of 1863 made liberal promises for a broad range of civil rights, reflecting principles similar to those found in the United States Constitution, such as freedom of association, press, speech, religion, and due process. Colombia also abolished the death penalty during this time. Lastly, Colombian society embraced inclusivity, emphasizing that rights should be granted "universally without notice of sex nor differences of color nor unjust preferences of fortune, nor distinctions of age".

== The Republic: Liberal and Conservative conflict ==
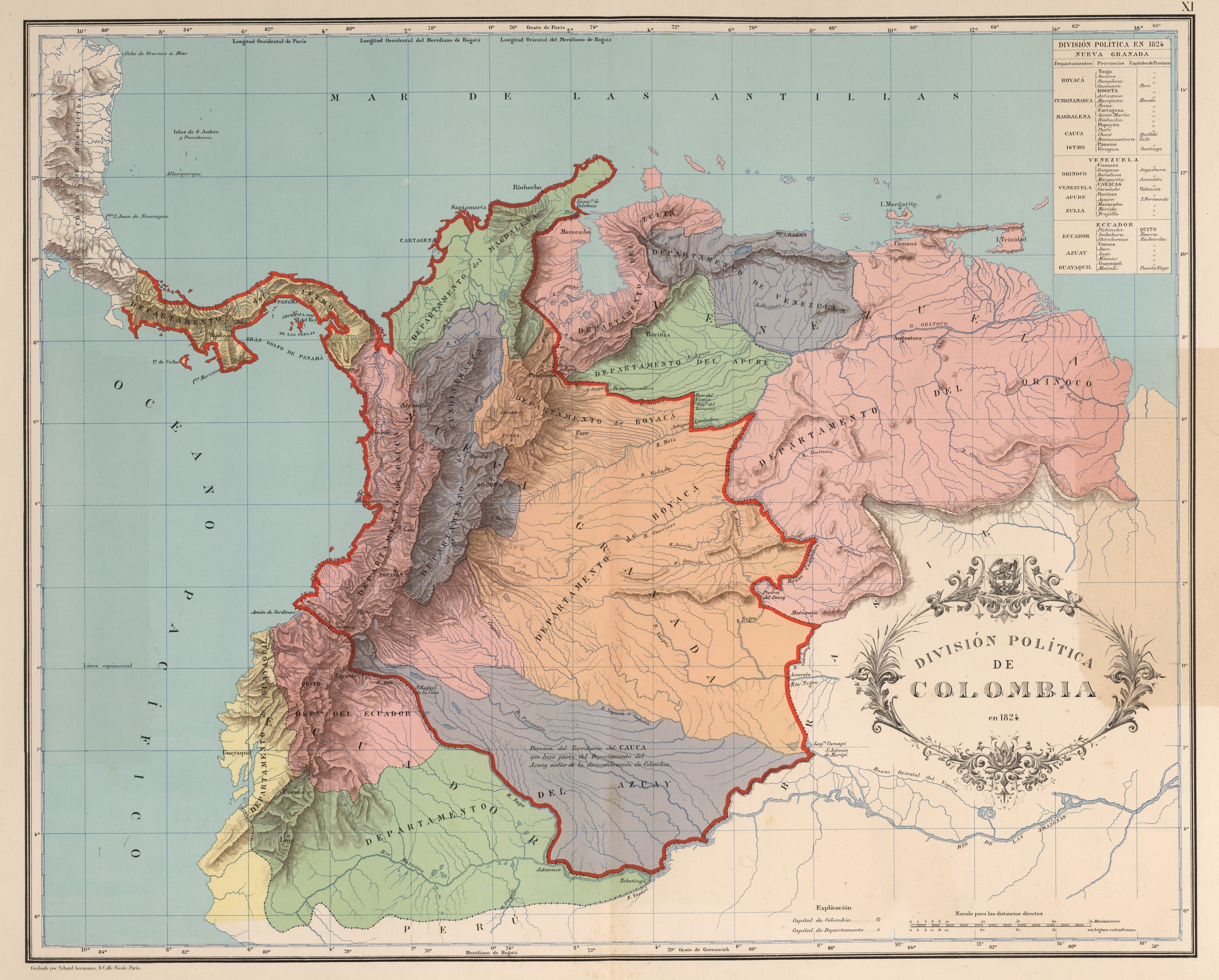
Map showing the shrinking territory of Gran Colombia from 1824 to 1890 (red line). Panama declared its independence from Colombia in 1903.

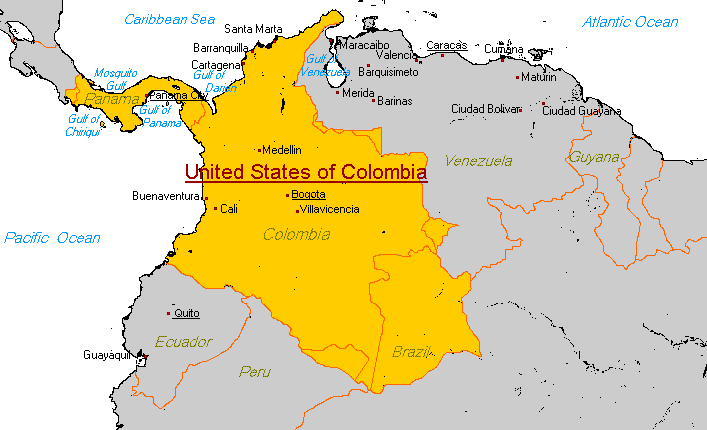
Map of the United States of Colombia 1863–1886

In 1863 the name of the republic was changed officially to "United States of Colombia," and in 1886 the country adopted its present name: "Republic of Colombia".

Two political parties grew out of conflicts between the followers of Bolívar and Santander and their political visions—the Conservatives and the Liberals – and have since dominated Colombian politics. Bolívar's supporters, who later formed the nucleus of the Conservative Party, sought strong centralized government, alliance with the Roman Catholic Church, and a limited franchise. Santander's followers, forerunners of the Liberals, wanted a decentralized government, state rather than church control over education and other civil matters, and a broadened suffrage. During the mid-19th century, Colombia embraced a vision of "American republican modernity," which emphasized democratic republicanism, universal male suffrage, and civil rights as markers of progress, positioning the country as a leader in the Atlantic World. This period saw Colombia enact significant political reforms, such as the 1853 Constitution, which eliminated property and literacy requirements for voting, making it one of the most democratic nations of its time. However, by the 1880s, Colombia shifted toward Western industrial modernity, prioritizing economic development and state centralization over the earlier focus on political rights, leading to the adoption of the 1886 Constitution and the end of its republican experiment.

Throughout the 19th and early 20th centuries, each party held the presidency for roughly equal periods of time. Colombia maintained a tradition of civilian government and regular, free elections. The military has seized power three times in Colombia's history: in 1830, after the dissolution of Great Colombia; again in 1854 (by General José María Melo); and from 1953 to 1957 (under General Gustavo Rojas Pinilla). Civilian rule was restored within one year in the first two instances.

Notwithstanding the country's commitment to democratic institutions, Colombia's history has also been characterized by widespread, violent conflict. Two civil wars resulted from bitter rivalry between the Conservative and Liberal parties. The Thousand Days' War (1899–1902) cost an estimated 100.000 lives, and up to 300.000 people died during "La Violencia" of the late 1940s and 1950s, a bipartisan confrontation which erupted after the assassination of Liberal popular candidate Jorge Eliécer Gaitán. United States activity to influence the area (especially the Panama Canal construction and control) led to a military uprising in the Isthmus Department in 1903, which resulted in the separation and independence of Panama.

A military coup in 1953 toppled the right-wing government of Conservative Laureano Gómez and brought General Gustavo Rojas Pinilla to power. Initially, Rojas enjoyed considerable popular support, due largely to his success in reducing "La Violencia." When he did not restore democratic rule and occasionally engaged in open repression, however, he was overthrown by the military in 1957 with the backing of both political parties, and a provisional government was installed.

== The National Front regime (1958–1974) ==
In July 1957, former Conservative President Laureano Gómez (1950–1953) and former Liberal President Alberto Lleras (1945–1946. 1958–1962) issued the "Declaration of Sitges," in which they proposed a "National Front," whereby the Liberal and Conservative parties would govern jointly. The presidency would be determined by an alternating conservative and liberal president every 4 years for 16 years; the two parties would have parity in all other elective offices.

The National Front ended "La Violencia," and National Front administrations attempted to institute far-reaching social and economic reforms in cooperation with the Alliance for Progress. In particular, the Liberal president Alberto Lleras Camargo (1958–1962) created the Colombian Institute for Agrarian Reform (INCORA), and Carlos Lleras Restrepo (1966–1970) further developed land entitlement. In 1968 and 1969 alone, the INCORA issued more than 60.000 land titles to farmers and workers.

In the end, the contradictions between each successive Liberal and Conservative administration made the results decidedly mixed. Despite the progress in certain sectors, many social and political injustices continued.

The National Front system itself eventually began to be seen as a form of political repression by dissidents and even many mainstream voters, and many protesters were victimized during this period. Especially after what was later confirmed as the fraudulent election of Conservative candidate Misael Pastrana in 1970, which resulted in the defeat of the relatively populist candidate and former president (dictator) Gustavo Rojas Pinilla. The M-19 guerrilla movement, "Movimiento 19 de Abril" (19 April Movement), would eventually be founded in part as a response to this particular event. The FARC was formed in 1964 by Manuel Marulanda Vélez and other Marxist–Leninist supporters after a military attack on the community of Marquetalia.

Although the system established by the Sitges agreement was phased out by 1974, the 1886 Colombian constitution — in effect until 1991—required that the losing political party be given adequate and equitable participation in the government, which, according to many observers and later analysis, eventually resulted in some increase in corruption and legal relaxation. The current 1991 constitution does not have that requirement, but subsequent administrations have tended to include members of opposition parties.

== Post-National Front ==
From 1974 until 1982, different presidential administrations chose to focus on ending the persistent insurgencies that sought to undermine Colombia's traditional political system. Both groups claimed to represent the poor and weak against the rich and powerful classes of the country, demanding the completion of true land and political reform from an openly Communist perspective.

By 1974, another challenge to the state's authority and legitimacy had come from 19th of April Movement (M-19), a mostly urban guerrilla group founded in response to an alleged electoral fraud during the final National Front election of Misael Pastrana Borrero (1970–1974) and the defeat of former dictator Gustavo Rojas Pinilla. Initially, the M-19 attracted a degree of attention and sympathy from mainstream Colombians that the FARC and National Liberation Army (ELN) had found largely elusive earlier due to extravagant and daring operations, such as stealing a sword that had belonged to Colombia's Independence hero Simon Bolívar. At the same time, its larger profile soon made it the focus of the state's counterinsurgency efforts.

The ELN guerrilla had been seriously crippled by military operations in the region of Anorí by 1974, but it managed to reconstitute itself and escape destruction, in part due to the administration of Alfonso López Michelsen (1974–1978) allowing it to escape encirclement, hoping to initiate a peace process with the group.

By 1982, the perceived passivity of the FARC, together with the relative success of the government's efforts against the M-19 and ELN, enabled the administration of the Liberal Party's Julio César Turbay (1978–1982) to lift a state-of-siege decree that had been in effect, on and off, for most of the previous 30 years. Under the latest such decree, president Turbay had implemented security policies that, though of some military value against the M-19 in particular, were considered highly questionable both inside and outside Colombian circles due to numerous accusations of military human rights abuses against suspects and captured guerrillas.

Citizen exhaustion due to the conflict's newfound intensity led to the election of president Belisario Betancur (1982–1986), a Conservative who won 47% of the popular vote, directed peace feelers at all the insurgents, and negotiated a 1984 cease-fire with the FARC and M-19 after a 1982 release of many guerrillas imprisoned during the previous effort to overpower them. The ELN rejected entering any negotiation and continued to recover itself through the use of extortions and threats, in particular against foreign oil companies of European and U.S. origin.

As these events were developing, the growing illegal drug trade and its consequences were also increasingly becoming a matter of widespread importance to all participants in the Colombian conflict. Guerrillas and newly wealthy drug lords had mutually uneven relations, and thus numerous incidents occurred between them. Eventually, the kidnapping of drug cartel family members by guerrillas led to the creation of the 1981 Muerte a Secuestradores (MAS) death squad ("Death to Kidnappers"). Pressure from the U.S. government and critical sectors of Colombian society was met with further violence, as the Medellín Cartel and its hitmen bribed or murdered numerous public officials, politicians and others who stood in its way by supporting the implementation of extradition of Colombian nationals to the U.S. Victims of cartel violence included Justice Minister Rodrigo Lara, whose assassination in 1984 made the Betancur administration begin to directly oppose the drug lords.

The first negotiated cease-fire with the M-19 ended when the guerrillas resumed fighting in 1985, claiming that the cease-fire had not been fully respected by official security forces, saying that several of its members had suffered threats and assaults, and also questioning the government's real willingness to implement any accords. The Betancur administration, in turn, questioned the M-19's actions and its commitment to the peace process, as it continued to advance high-profile negotiations with the FARC, which led to the creation of the Patriotic Union (Colombia) (UP), a legal and non-clandestine political organization.

On November 6, 1985, the M-19 stormed the Colombian Palace of Justice and held the Supreme Court magistrates hostage, intending to put president Betancur on trial. In the ensuing crossfire that followed the military's reaction, scores of people lost their lives, as did most of the guerrillas, including several high-ranking operatives. Both sides blamed each other for the outcome.

Meanwhile, individual FARC members initially joined the UP leadership in representation of the guerrilla command, though most of the guerrilla's chiefs and militiamen did not demobilize nor disarm, as that was not a requirement of the process at that point in time. Tension soon significantly increased as both sides began to accuse each other of not respecting the cease-fire. Political violence against FARC and UP members (including presidential candidate Jaime Pardo) was blamed on drug lords and also on members of the security forces (to a much lesser degree on the argued inaction of Betancur administration). Members of the government and security authorities increasingly accused the FARC of continuing to recruit guerrillas. as well as kidnapping, extorting and politically intimidating voters even as the UP was already participating in politics.

The Virgilio Barco (1986–1990) administration, in addition to continuing to handle the difficulties of the complex negotiations with the guerrillas, also inherited a particularly chaotic confrontation against the drug lords, who were engaged in a campaign of terrorism and murder in response to government moves in favor of their extradition overseas. The UP also suffered an increasing number of losses during this term (including the assassination of presidential candidate Bernardo Jaramillo), which stemmed both from private proto-paramilitary organizations, increasingly powerful drug lords and a number of would-be paramilitary-sympathizers within the armed forces.

== Post-1990 ==
Following administrations had to contend with the guerrillas, paramilitaries, narcotics traffickers and the violence and corruption that they all perpetuated, both through force and negotiation. Narcoterrorists assassinated three presidential candidates before César Gaviria was elected in 1990. Since the death of Medellín cartel leader Pablo Escobar in a police shootout in December 1993, indiscriminate acts of violence associated with that organization have abated as the "cartels" have broken up into multiple smaller and often-competing trafficking organizations. Nevertheless, violence continues as these drug organizations resort to violence as part of their operations but also to protest government policies, including extradition.

The M-19 and several smaller guerrilla groups were successfully incorporated into a peace process as the 1980s ended and the 1990s began, which culminated in the elections for a Constituent Assembly of Colombia that would write a new constitution, which took effect in 1991. The new Constitution brought about a considerable number of institutional and legal reforms based on principles that the delegates considered as more modern, humanist, democratic and politically open than those in the 1886 constitution. Practical results were mixed and mingled emerged (such as the debate surrounding the constitutional prohibition of extradition, which later was reversed), but together with the reincorporation of some of the guerrilla groups to the legal political framework, the new Constitution inaugurated an era that was both a continuation and a gradual, but significant, departure from what had come before.

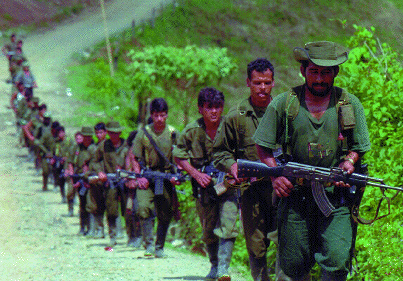
FARC insurgents in 1998

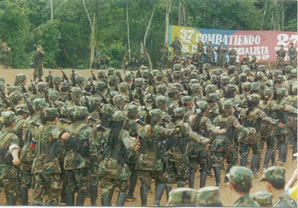
FARC guerrillas marching in formation during the Caguan peace talks (1998–2002)

Contacts with the FARC, which had irregularly continued despite the generalized de facto interruptions of the ceasefire and the official 1987 break from negotiations, were temporarily cut off in 1990 under the presidency of César Gaviria (1990–1994). The Colombian Army's assault on the FARC's Casa Verde sanctuary at La Uribe, Meta, followed by a FARC offensive that sought to undermine the deliberations of the Constitutional Assembly, began to highlight a significant break in the uneven negotiations carried over from the previous decade.

President Ernesto Samper assumed office in August 1994. However, a political crisis relating to large-scale contributions from drug traffickers to Samper's presidential campaign diverted attention from governance programs, thus slowing, and in many cases, halting progress on the nation's domestic reform agenda. The military also suffered several setbacks in its fight against the guerrillas when several of its rural bases began to be overrun and a record number of soldiers and officers were taken prisoner by the FARC (which since 1982 was attempting to implement a more "conventional" style of warfare. seeking to eventually defeat the military in the field).

On August 7, 1998, Andrés Pastrana was sworn in as the President of Colombia. A member of the Conservative Party, Pastrana defeated Liberal Party candidate Horacio Serpa in a run-off election marked by high voter turnout and little political unrest. The new president's program was based on a commitment to bring about a peaceful resolution of Colombia's longstanding civil conflict and to cooperate fully with the United States to combat the trafficking of illegal drugs.

While early initiatives in the Colombian peace process gave reason for optimism, the Pastrana administration also has had to combat high unemployment and other economic problems, such as the fiscal deficit and the impact of global financial instability on Colombia. During his administration, unemployment has risen to over 20%. Additionally, the growing severity of countrywide guerrilla attacks by the FARC and ELN. and smaller movements, as well as the growth of drug production, corruption and the spread of even more violent paramilitary groups such as the United Self-Defense Forces of Colombia (AUC) has made it difficult to solve the country's problems.

Although the FARC and ELN accepted participation in the peace process, they did not make explicit commitments to end the conflict. The FARC suspended talks in November 2000, to protest what it called "paramilitary terrorism" but returned to the negotiating table in February 2001 following 2 days of meetings between President Pastrana and FARC leader Manuel Marulanda. The Colombian Government and ELN in early 2001 continued discussions aimed at opening a formal peace process.

== Since 2004 ==
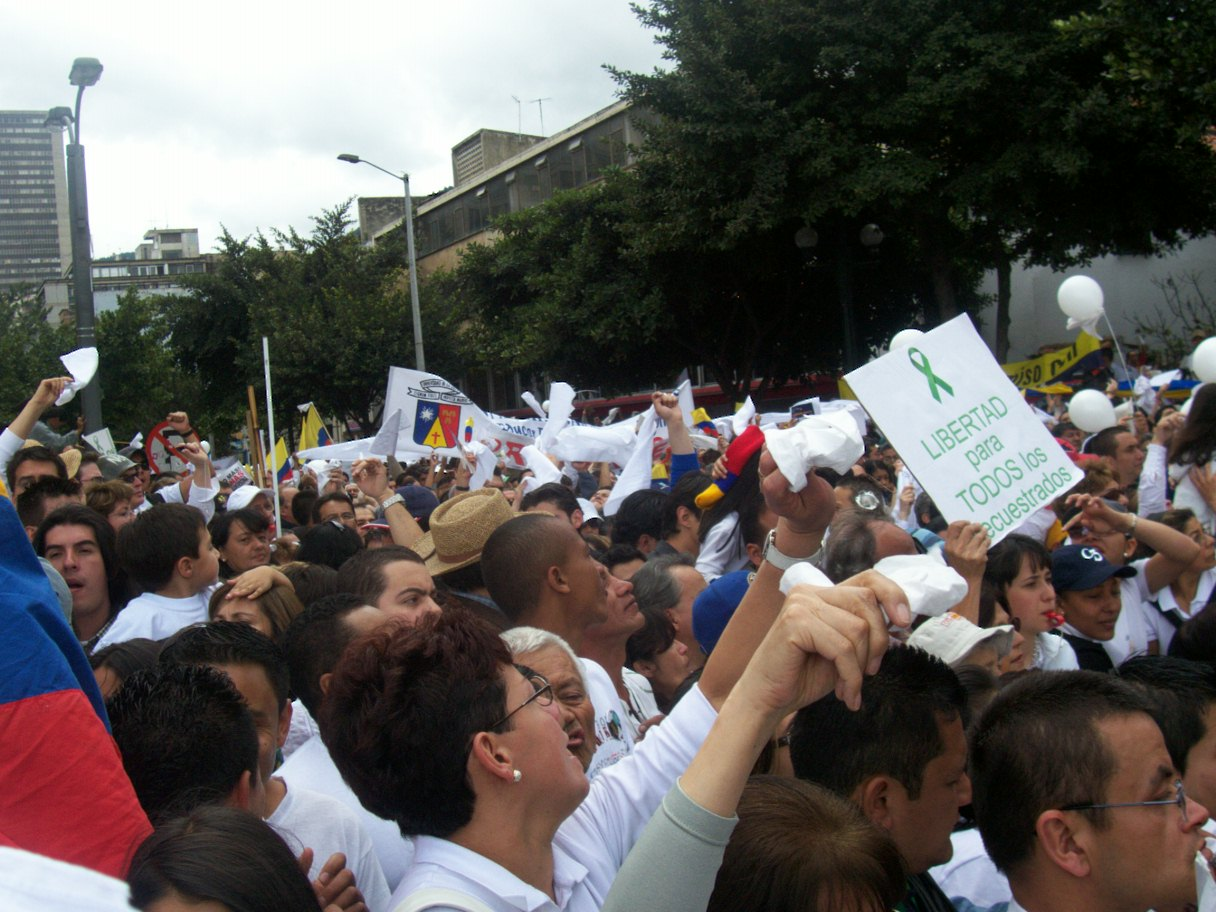
Colombia's peace protests, 2007

By 2004, the security situation of Colombia had shown improvement, and the economy, while still fragile, had also shown some positive signs. On the other hand, relatively little had been accomplished in structurally solving most of the country's other grave problems, in part due to legislative and political conflicts between the administration and the Colombian Congress (including those over the controversial 2006 project to give President Álvaro Uribe the right to be re-elected), and a relative lack of freely allocated funds and credits. In October 2006, Uribe was re-elected by a landslide.

Some critical observers consider in retrospect that Uribe's policies, while admittedly reducing crime and guerrilla activity, were too slanted in favor of a military solution to Colombia's internal war, neglecting grave social and human rights concerns to a certain extent. They hoped that Uribe's government would make serious efforts towards improving the human rights situation inside the country, protecting civilians and reducing any abuses committed by the armed forces.

Uribe's supporters in turn believed that increased military action was a necessary prelude to any serious negotiation attempt with the guerrillas and that the increased security situation would help the government, in the long term, to focus more actively on reducing most wide-scale abuses and human rights violations on the part of both the armed groups and any rogue security forces that might have links to the paramilitaries. In short, these supporters maintained that the security situation needed to be stabilized in favor of the government before any other social concerns could take precedence. In February 2010, the constitutional court blocked President Alvaro Uribe from seeking re-election again. Uribe left the presidency in 2010.

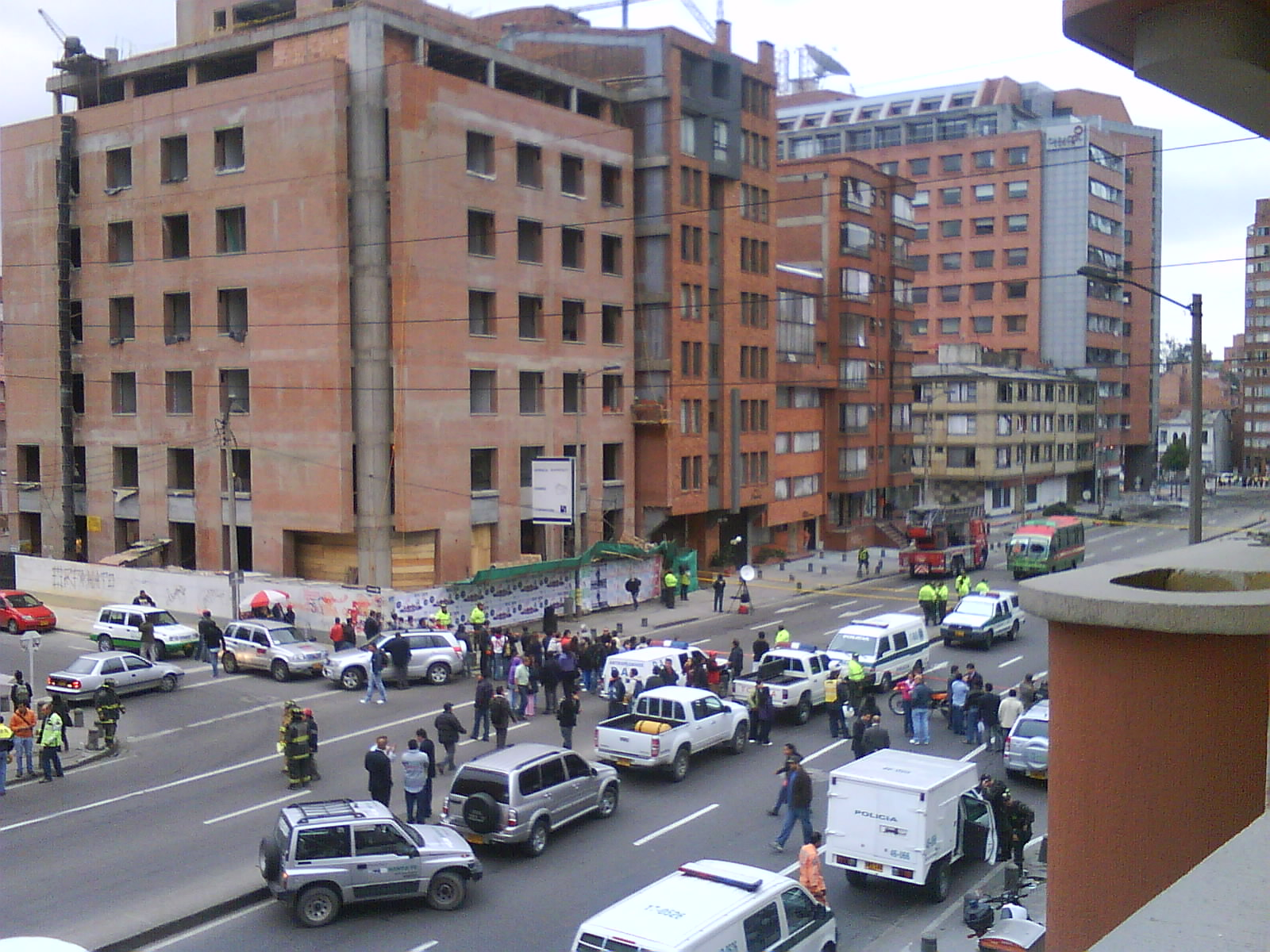
On 12 August 2010, a terrorist attack by the FARC with a car bomb at the headquarters of Caracol Radioleft 43 people injured.

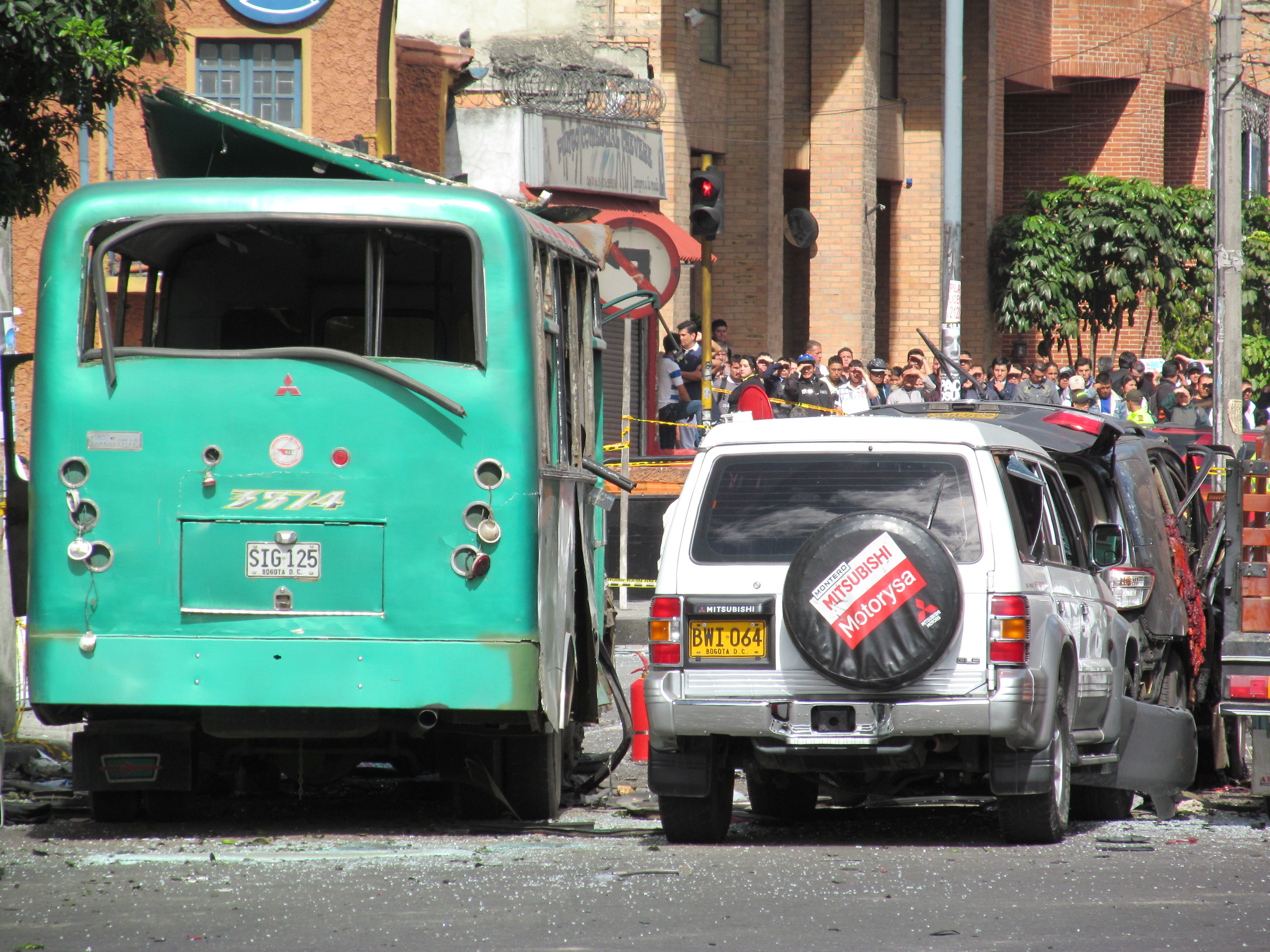
2012 car bombing targeting the former minister Fernando Londoño

In 2010, Juan Manuel Santos was elected president; he was supported by ex-president Uribe, and he owed his election mainly through having won over former Uribe supporters. But two years after winning the presidential election, Santos (to widespread surprise) began peace talks with FARC. which took place in Havana. Re-elected in 2014, Santos revived an important infrastructure program, which had been planned during the Uribe administration. Focused mainly on the provision of national highways, the program was led by former vice-president Germán Vargas Lleras.

In 2015, Colombia's Congress limited presidency to single term, preventing the president from seeking re-election.

Talks between the government and the guerrillas resulted in the announcement of a peace agreement. However, a referendum to ratify the deal was unsuccessful. Afterward, the Colombian government and the FARC signed a revised peace deal in November 2016, which the Colombian congress approved. In 2016, President Santos was awarded the Nobel Peace Prize. The government began a process of attention and comprehensive reparation for victims of conflict. Colombia under President Santos showed some progress in the struggle to defend human rights, as expressed by HRW. A Special Jurisdiction of Peace was created to investigate, clarify, prosecute and punish serious human rights violations and grave breaches of international humanitarian law which occurred during the armed conflict and to satisfy victims' right to justice. During his visit to Colombia, Pope Francis paid tribute to the victims of the conflict.

In May 2018, Ivan Duque, the candidate of the conservative Centro Democrático (Democratic Centre), won the presidential election. On 7 August 2018, he was sworn in as the new president of Colombia.

Colombia's relations with Venezuela have fluctuated due to the ideological differences between both governments. Colombia has offered humanitarian support with food and medicines to mitigate the shortage of supplies in Venezuela. Colombia's Foreign Ministry said that all efforts to resolve Venezuela's crisis should be peaceful. Colombia proposed the idea of the Sustainable Development Goals and a final document was adopted by the United Nations. In February 2019, Venezuelan president Nicolás Maduro cut diplomatic relations with Colombia after Colombian President Ivan Duque helped Venezuelan opposition politicians deliver humanitarian aid to their country. Colombia recognized Venezuelan opposition leader Juan Guaido as the country's legitimate president. In January 2020, Colombia rejected Maduro's proposal that the two countries restore diplomatic relations.

The 19 June 2022 election run-off vote ended in a win for former guerrilla Gustavo Petro, taking 50.47% of the vote compared to 47.27% of right-wing Rodolfo Hernández. The single-term limit for the country's presidency prevented president Iván Duque from seeking re-election. Petro became the country's first leftist president-elect. On 7 August 2022, he was sworn in. On 24 April 2026, President Gustavo Petro became the first foreign leader to visit Venezuela’s interim President Delcy Rodriguez after the 2026 United States intervention in Venezuela.

The 21 June 2026 election run-off vote ended in a win for right-wing candidate, Abelardo de la Espriella, taking 49.7% of the vote compared to 48.7% of left-wing Iván Cepeda. On 7 August 2026, Abelardo de la Espriella was sworn in as Colombia’s president. The new right-wing government immediately restored full diplomatic and economic relations with Israel, withdrew Colombia’s recognition of the Sahrawi Arab Democratic Republic and cut diplomatic relations with Cuba and Nicaragua. Colombia joined the “Shield of the Americas”, a regional security alliance led by the United States. In September 2026, Colombia cut diplomatic ties with Iran.

== See also ==
- Colombia during World War II
- Economic history of Colombia
- List of presidents of Colombia
- Politics of Colombia
- History of the Americas
- History of Latin America
- History of South America
- Spanish colonization of the Americas

== Bibliography ==
- Ocampo López, Javier [in Spanish] (2007). Grandes cultures indígenas de América [Great indigenous cultures of the Americas] (in Spanish). Bogotá, Colombia: Plaza & Janes Editores Colombia S.A. ISBN 978-958-14-0368-4.
