= Quinta de Bolívar =

National monument of Colombia

Coordinates: 4.602°N 74.072°W

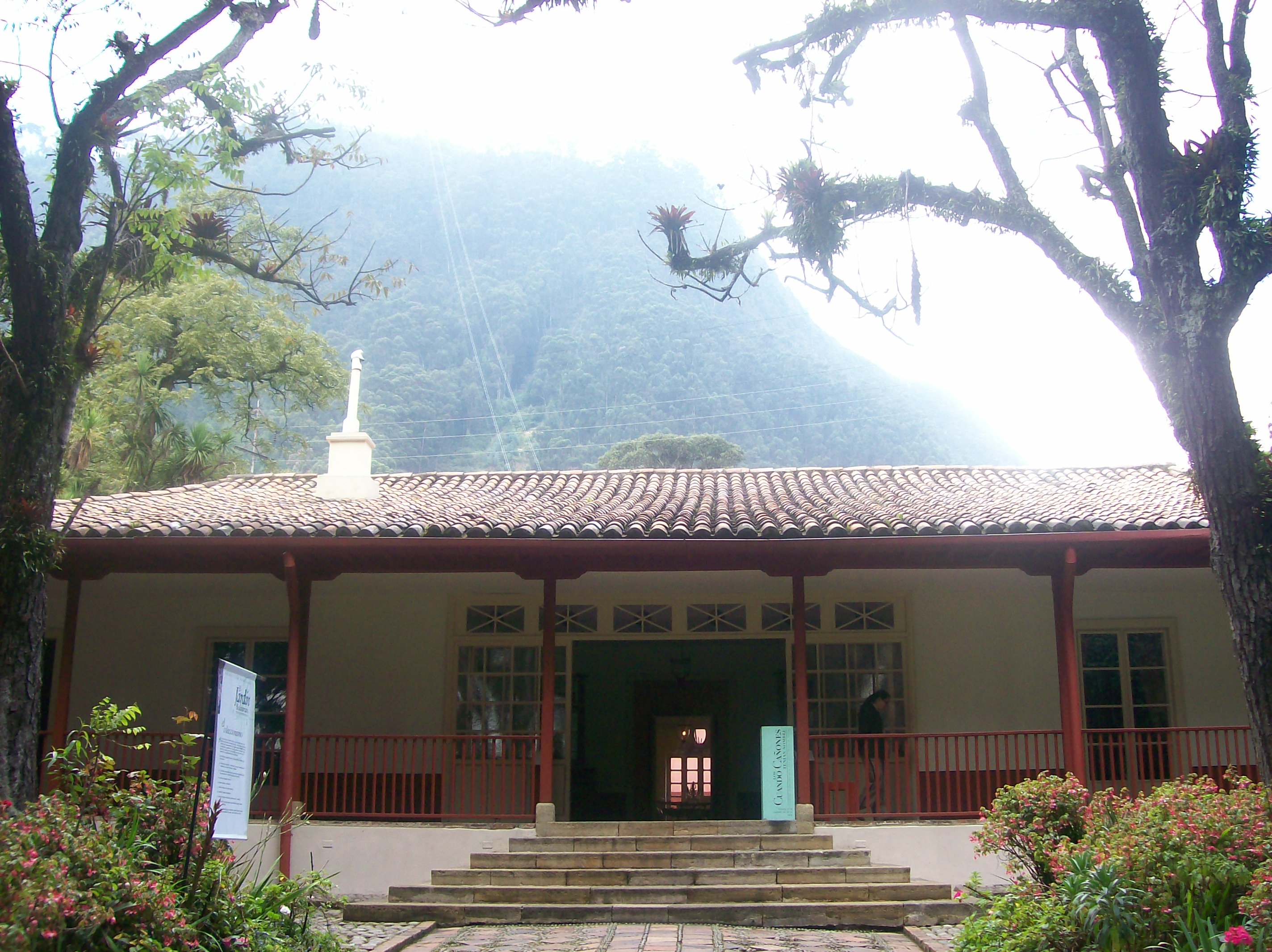
The Quinta de Bolívar.

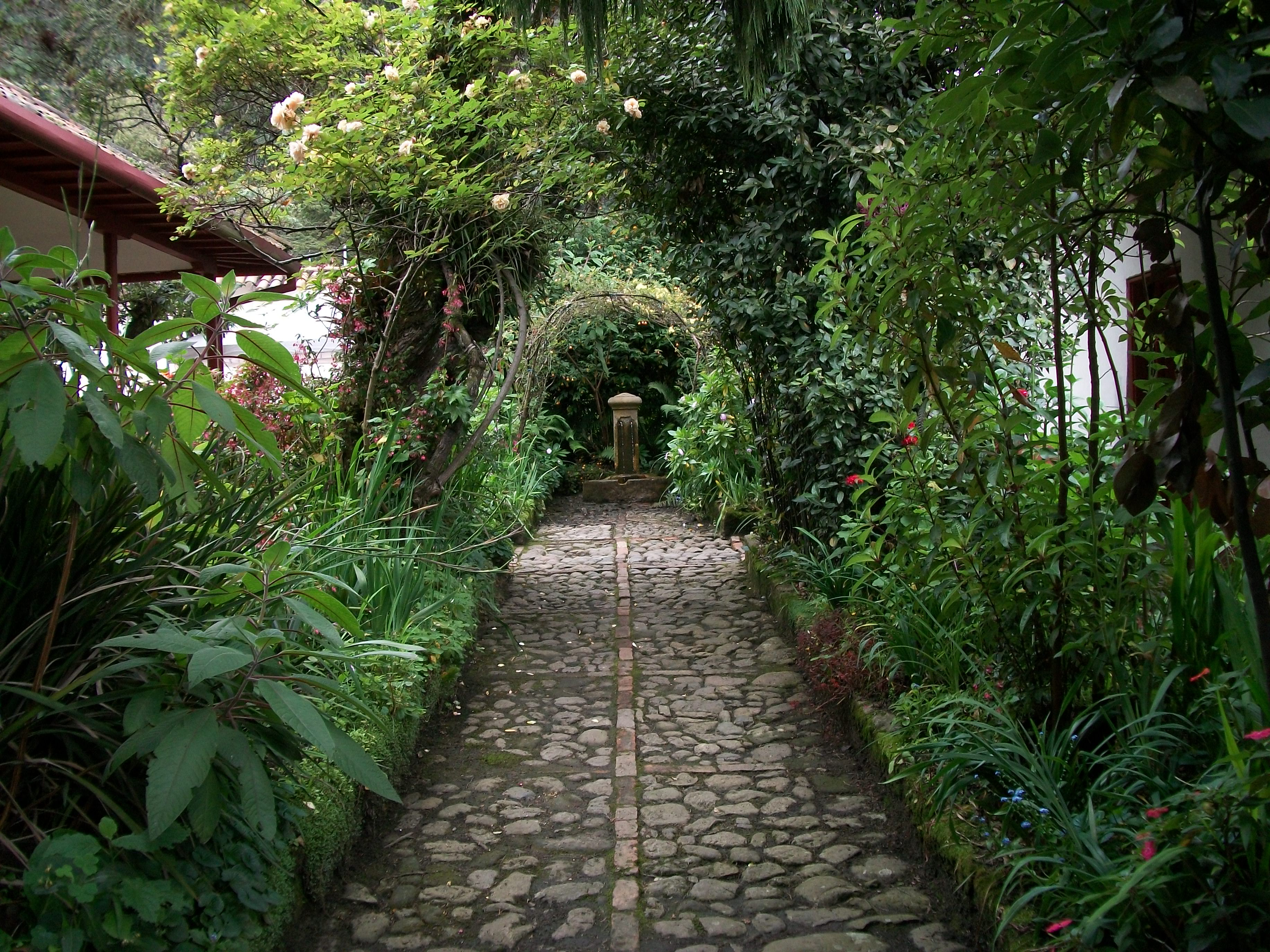
The gardens of the Quinta de Bolívar.

The Quinta de Bolívar is a colonial house in Bogotá, Colombia, that served as a residence to Simón Bolívar in the capital after the war of independence. It is now used as a museum dedicated to Bolívar's life and times.

== History ==
The history of the house goes back to the late 17th century when the land was sold by the chaplain of Monserrate to José Antonio Portocarreño, a Spanish merchant, who built a country house there. After his death his heirs could not maintain the property and it had seriously deteriorated by the time the newly independent government bought it and gave it to Bolívar as a sign of gratitude for his role in the war of independence. The house was restored for his use and between 1820 and 1830 Bolívar stayed there for a short time whenever he visited Bogotá.

After Bolívar had to abandon the capital, he gave the house to his friend José Ignacio París. Later the house changed hands several times and throughout the 19th century it was used for the most diverse purposes: it was a health house, a brewery, a tannery and a girls school. Finally in 1919, when the property was again up for sale, the Colombian Historic Society and the Embellishment Society of Bogotá began a national fund-raising campaign in order to buy it. After it had been purchased as a national monument, it became a museum with artifacts from the independence times including objects belonging to Simón Bolívar. It is also used as a venue for diplomatic and cultural events. Several important restoration projects have taken place in both the house and gardens and some infrastructure work has been undertaken to adapt the property to its current function.

On January 17, 1974, in a symbolic act, Álvaro Fayad, a co-founder of the M-19 guerrilla movement stole Bolívar's sword leaving behind a note that began, "Bolívar, your sword returns to the battlefield." On January 31, 1991, Antonio Navarro, a leader of the M-19, returned the sword almost 17 years after its theft as part of the group's peace negotiations with the government.
