= Theft of Bolívar's sword =

1974 heist in Colombia

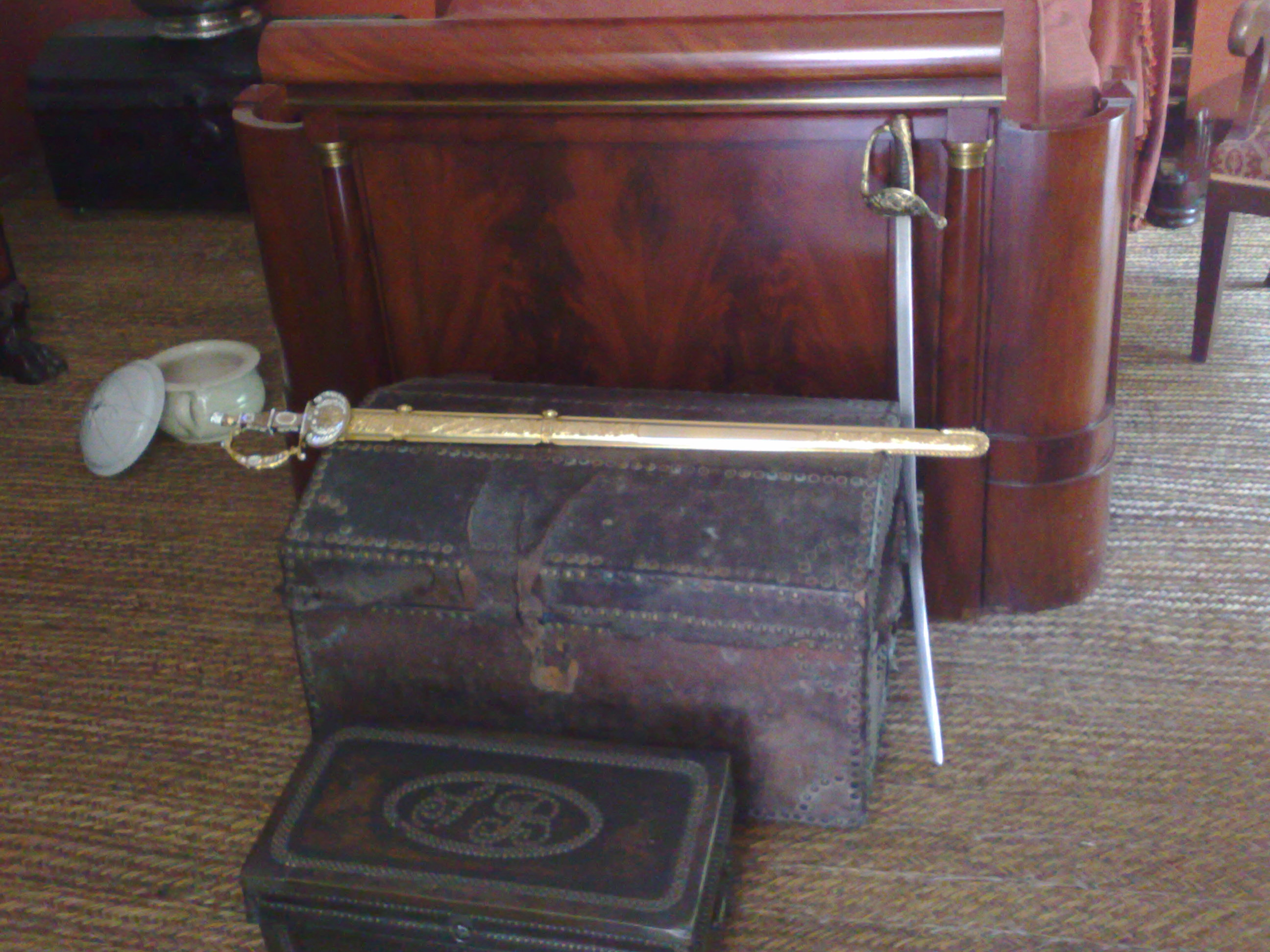
- Simón Bolívar's sword
- Date: January 17, 1974
- Time: 05:00 p.m. UTC−05:00
- Location: Quinta de Bolívar, Bogotá, Colombia
- Type: Heist
- Perpetrator: M-19 Movement

The theft of Bolívar's sword (Spanish: robo de la espada de Bolívar) occurred on January 17, 1974, when forces of the 19th of April Movement (or M-19) broke into the Quinta de Bolívar outside Bogotá and successfully stole a sword and other relics belonging to Simón Bolívar. The objective of the heist was to symbolically announce the beginning of the M-19's insurgency in Colombia.

== Background ==
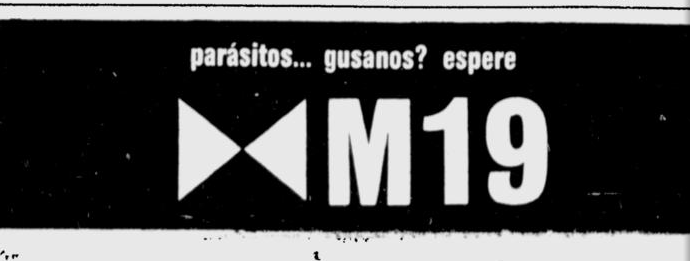
The ad M-19 placed in El Tiempo shortly before the heist which reads "parasites?... worms? wait (for) M19"

Around the year 1970, Luis Otero Cifuentes and Jaime Bateman proposed at a FARC meeting that the group steal the sword to emulate an action they had read about done by Uruguayan Tupamaros who had symbolically stolen an old Artigas flag. The plan was turned down by FARC, but Bateman and associates, in a group called Los Comuneros, would begin to scope out the Quinta de Bolívar in 1973 in preparation for an action later.

The action was planned to deliberately call to the fore the importance of nationalist Bolivarian influence in the nascent M-19, in contrast to previous Leninist and Maoist leftist groups in Colombia. By seizing a national symbol associated with revolution, the M-19 planned to symbolically assert a connection to the Spanish American wars of independence.

Immediately preceding the heist, M-19 placed a cryptic ad in Colombian newspaper El Tiempo.

The sword is not confirmed to have belonged to Bolívar. It is a curved sabre between 50 and 60 centimeters long. It has a gilded hilt and was displayed unsheathed at the time of the heist.

== The heist ==
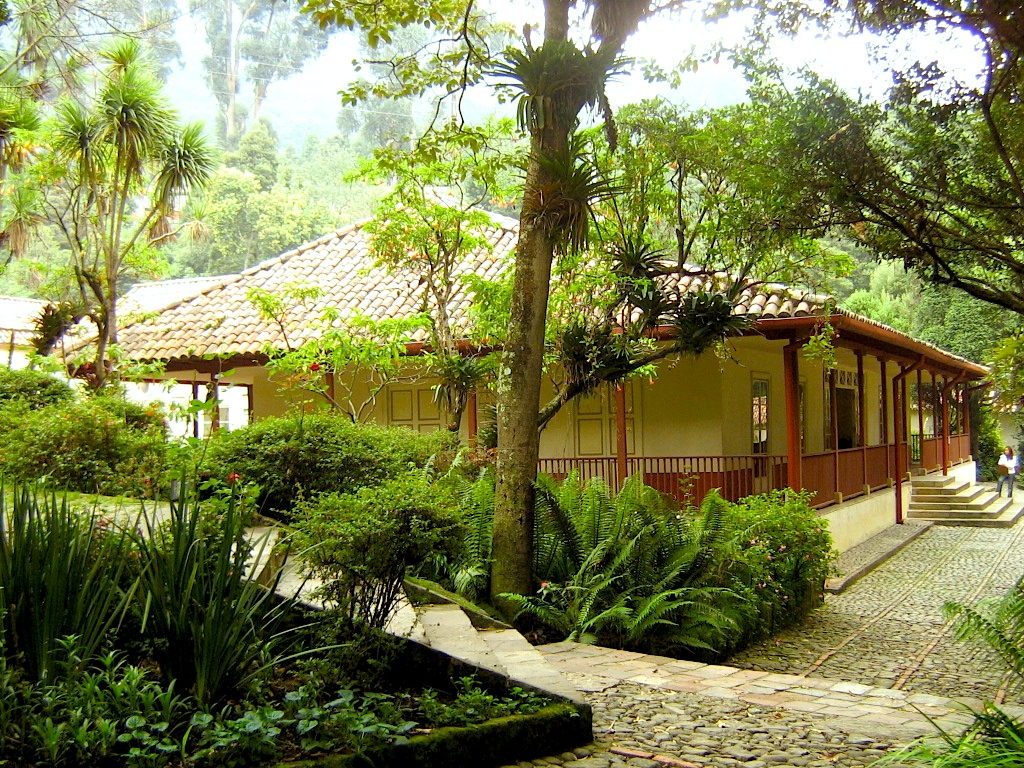
Quinta de Bolívar in 2006

The heist began on January 17, 1974, at 5:00 p.m. Álvaro Fayad, co-founder of M-19, led a small group into the Quinta de Bolívar. He used a crowbar to break a lock of a room and crossed into another with the sword. He broke the glass case containing the sword and took it, as well as the spurs and stirrups also in the glass case. The group used a Renault 6 as a getaway car, but could not leave immediately, because the members did not know how to drive.

A sign was placed in the place of the sword which read, "Bolívar, your sword returns to the fight."

== Afermath and subsequent M-19 actions ==
The immediate aftermath of the heist was widespread media coverage, especially in Colombia. On February 15, M-19 published a photograph in the Alternativa magazine showing the captured relics. The M-19 Movement was able to grow to more than 200 members after the incident. Significant M-19 attacks included a 1980 siege of the embassy of the Dominican Republic, as well as the Palace of Justice siege.

== Fate of the sword ==
The sword was sent to various people until it eventually reached Cuba. It was at León de Greiff's residence on the permission of his son Boris de Greiff at the time of a visit by Colombian president Alfonso López Michelsen. According to M-19 member Antonio Navarro Wolff, the captured sword was sent to the Cuban embassy in Panama, where it was supposed to be sent on to Cuba, but the staff forgot to ever send it there. The sword remained in the embassy until it was almost lost during the United States invasion of Panama. It was apparently finally sent to Havana during the invasion, though M-19 was not aware of its location after it had been given over to the embassy. A different account is given by other M-19 members, who place the sword at having been sent from the Cuban embassy in Colombia directly to Cuba, where it was kept in a cabinet in Manuel Piñeiro's office. Álvaro Fayad requested that the sword be sent back to Colombia in the mid-1980s but the sword got stuck in the Cuban embassy in Panama due to Fayad's death in the aftermath of the Palace of Justice siege in 1986. It was returned to Cuba in 1989 through American-occupied Panama.

After M-19 demobilized to become a legitimate political party, it promised to return the sword by December 18, 1990, but eventually admitted they did not know where it was. At the time, Navarro had said, "We know what doors to knock on, and we are following all the steps, one at a time, needed to recover the valuable object." The party placed newspaper ads asking for leads on the location of the sword. Carlos Pizarro Leongómez claimed to know where it was, but he was assassinated in April 1990. Eventually, on January 31, 1991, after a request from Otty Patiño at the Cuban embassy in Caracas, the Cubans handed the sword over to former members in Venezuela, though not the stirrups and spurs. The sword was moved to a vault in the Colombian Bank of the Republic, and then to the Casa de Nariño, the Colombian presidential residence.

Many former members of M-19 achieved prominence in Colombian politics later, including Antonio Navarro Wolff and Otty Patino who were present at the handing over ceremony of the sword from Cuba, as well as Colombian president Gustavo Petro, who put it on display to his right side during his 2022 inauguration, which outgoing president Iván Duque tried to prevent. The legacy of the heist is controversial in Colombia. Petro's government has commemorated the theft on the basis of historical importance, which his opposition views as glorification of a criminal act. Paloma Valencia of the Democratic Center party denounced a 50th anniversary event hosted by Petro. Then Minister of Colombia Juan David Correa, who was present at the event, said of the sword, "It speaks to us of a republican dream that a man had more than 200 years ago."

== Copycats ==
Similar incidents of sword-stealing have occurred in Colombia since the theft. In 2010, FARC claimed to have taken a sword that belonged to Bolívar. FARC did not substantiate the alleged Bolivarian identity of the sword in its video. The sword for the statue of Bolívar at the Plaza de Bolívar (which was formerly at Quinta de Bolívar) was broken off in 2018.
